= Amendments to the Internal Revenue Laws of the United States =

This article lists the statutes amending the internal revenue laws of the United States.

== 1800–1899 ==
- Ch. 45, 12 Stat. 292 Enacted 08/05/1861 Revenue Act of 1861
- Ch. 119, 12 Stat. 432 Enacted 07/01/1862 Revenue Act of 1862
- 13 Stat. 22 Enacted 06/30/1864 Revenue Act of 1864
- Ch. 349, §73, 28 Stat. 570, Enacted 08/27/1894 Wilson–Gorman Tariff Act

== 1900s ==
- ch. 6, 36 Stat. 11 Payne–Aldrich Tariff Act

== 1910s ==
- Revenue Act of 1913
- Emergency Internal Revenue Tax Act
- Revenue Act of 1916
- War Revenue Act of 1917
- Revenue Act of 1918

== 1920s ==
- Revenue Act of 1921
- Revenue Act of 1924
- Revenue Act of 1926
- Revenue Act of 1928

== 1930s ==
- Revenue Act of 1932
- Revenue Act of 1934
- Revenue Act of 1935
- Revenue Act of 1936
- Revenue Act of 1937
- Revenue Act of 1938
- Internal Revenue Code of 1939

== 1940s ==
- Revenue Act of 1940
- Second Revenue Act of 1940
- Revenue Act of 1941
- Revenue Act of 1942
- Revenue Act of 1943
- Current Tax Payment Act of 1943
- Individual Income Tax Act of 1944
- Revenue Act of 1945
- Revenue Act of 1948

== 1950s ==
- Revenue Act of 1950
- Excess profits tax (1950)
- P.L. 82-183 Enacted 10/20/51 Revenue Act of 1951
- P.L. 83-324 Enacted 03/31/54 Excise Tax Reduction Act of 1954
- P.L. 83-517 Enacted 07/22/1954 Revised Organic Act of the Virgin Islands
- P.L. 83-591 Enacted 08/16/54 Internal Revenue Code of 1954
- P.L. 83-703 Enacted 08/30/1954 Atomic Energy Act of 1954
- P.L. 83-729 Enacted 08/31/1954
- P.L. 83-746 Enacted 08/31/1954
- P.L. 83-761 Enacted 09/01/1954 Social Security Amendments of 1954
- P.L. 83-767 Enacted 09/01/1954
- P.L. 84-1 Enacted 01/20/1955
- P.L. 84-9 Enacted 03/02/1955
- P.L. 84-18 Enacted 03/30/1955 Tax Rate Extension Act of 1955
- P.L. 84-74 Enacted 06/15/1955
- P.L. 84-299 Enacted 08/09/1955
- P.L. 84-306 Enacted 08/09/1955
- P.L. 84-317 Enacted 08/09/1955
- P.L. 84-321 Enacted 08/09/1955
- P.L. 84-333 Enacted 08/09/1955
- P.L. 84-354 Enacted 08/11/1955
- P.L. 84-355 Enacted 08/11/1955
- P.L. 84-366 Enacted 08/11/1955
- P.L. 84-367 Enacted 08/11/1955
- P.L. 84-379 Enacted 08/12/1955
- P.L. 84-384 Enacted 08/12/1955
- P.L. 84-385 Enacted 08/12/1955
- P.L. 84-396 Enacted 01/28/1956
- P.L. 84-398 Enacted 01/28/1956
- P.L. 84-400 Enacted 01/28/1956
- P.L. 84-414 Enacted 02/20/1956
- P.L. 84-429 Enacted 03/13/1956 Life Insurance Company Tax Act for 1955
- P.L. 84-458 Enacted 03/29/1956 Tax Rate Extension Act of 1956
- P.L. 84-466 Enacted 04/02/1956
- P.L. 84-495 Enacted 04/27/1956
- P.L. 84-511 Enacted 05/09/1956 Bank Holding Company Act of 1956
- P.L. 84-545 Enacted 05/29/1956
- P.L. 84-627 Enacted 06/29/1956 Federal-Aid Highway Act of 1956
- P.L. 84-628 Enacted 06/29/1956
- P.L. 84-629 Enacted 06/29/1956
- P.L. 84-700 Enacted 07/11/1956
- P.L. 84-726 Enacted 07/18/1956 Mutual Security Act of 1956
- P.L. 84-728 Enacted 07/18/1956 Narcotic Control Act of 1956
- P.L. 84-784 Enacted 07/24/1956
- P.L. 84-796 Enacted 07/25/1956
- P.L. 84-880 Enacted 08/01/1956 Social Security Amendments of 1956
- P.L. 84-881 Enacted 08/01/1956 Servicemen's and Veterans' Survivor Benefits Act
- P.L. 84-896 Enacted 08/01/1956
- P.L. 84-1010 Enacted 08/06/1956
- P.L. 84-1011 Enacted 08/06/1956
- P.L. 84-1015 Enacted 08/07/1956
- P.L. 84-1022 Enacted 08/07/1956
- P.L. 85-12 Enacted 03/29/1957 Tax Rate Extension Act of 1957
- P.L. 85-56 Enacted 06/17/1957 Veterans' Benefits Act of 1957
- P.L. 85-74 Enacted 08/29/1957
- P.L. 85-165 Enacted 08/26/1957
- P.L. 85-235 Enacted 08/30/1957
- P.L. 85-239 Enacted 02/30/1958
- P.L. 85-320 Enacted 02/11/1958
- P.L. 85-321 Enacted 02/11/1958
- P.L. 85-323 Enacted 03/11/1958
- P.L. 85-345 Enacted 03/17/1958
- P.L. 85-367 Enacted 04/07/1958
- P.L. 85-380 Enacted 04/16/1958
- P.L. 85-475 Enacted 06/30/1958 Tax Rate Extension Act of 1958
- P.L. 85-517 Enacted 08/28/1958 Social Security Amendments of 1958
- P.L. 85-840 Enacted 09/02/1958 Excise Tax Technical Changes Act of 1958
- P.L. 85-859 Enacted 09/02/1958 Technical Amendments Act of 1958
- P.L. 85-866 Enacted 09/02/1958 Small Business Tax Revision Act of 1958
- P.L. 85-881 Enacted 09/02/1958
- P.L. 86-28 Enacted 05/19/1959
- P.L. 86-69 Enacted 06/25/1959 Life Insurance Company Income Tax Act of 1959
- P.L. 86-70 Enacted 06/25/1959 Alaska Omnibus Bill
- P.L. 86-75 Enacted 06/30/1959 Tax Rate Extension Act of 1959
- P.L. 86-141 Enacted 08/07/1959
- P.L. 86-168 Enacted 08/18/1959 Farm Credit Act of 1959
- P.L. 86-175 Enacted 08/21/1959
- P.L. 86-280 Enacted 09/16/1959
- P.L. 86-319 Enacted 09/21/1959
- P.L. 86-342 Enacted 09/21/1959 Federal-Aid Highway Act of 1959
- P.L. 86-344 Enacted 09/21/1959
- P.L. 86-346 Enacted 09/22/1959
- P.L. 86-368 Enacted 09/22/1959
- P.L. 86-376 Enacted 09/23/1959

== 1960s ==
- P.L. 86-413 Enacted 04/08/1960
- P.L. 86-416 Enacted 04/08/1960
- P.L. 86-418 Enacted 04/08/1960
- P.L. 86-422 Enacted 04/08/1960
- P.L. 86-428 Enacted 04/22/1960
- P.L. 86-429 Enacted 04/22/1960 Narcotics Manufacturing Act of 1960
- P.L. 86-435 Enacted 04/22/1960
- P.L. 86-437 Enacted 04/22/1960
- P.L. 86-440 Enacted 04/22/1960
- P.L. 86-459 Enacted 05/13/1960 Dealer Reserve Income Adjustment Act of 1960
- P.L. 86-470 Enacted 05/14/1960
- P.L. 86-478 Enacted 06/01/1960
- P.L. 86-496 Enacted 06/08/1960
- P.L. 86-564 Enacted 06/30/1960 Public Debt and Tax Rate Extension Act of 1960
- P.L. 86-592 Enacted 07/06/1960
- P.L. 86-594 Enacted 07/06/1960
- P.L. 86-624 Enacted 07/12/1960 Hawaii Omnibus Act
- P.L. 86-667 Enacted 07/14/1960
- P.L. 86-707 Enacted 09/06/1960 Overseas Differentials and Allowances Act
- P.L. 86-723 Enacted 09/08/1960 Foreign Service Act Amendments of 1960
- P.L. 86-778 Enacted 09/13/1960 Social Security Amendments of 1960
- P.L. 86-779 Enacted 09/14/1960
- P.L. 86-780 Enacted 09/14/1960
- P.L. 86-781 Enacted 09/14/1960
- P.L. 87-6 Enacted 03/24/1961 Temporary Extended Unemployment Compensation Act of 1961
- P.L. 87-15 Enacted 03/31/1961
- P.L. 87-29 Enacted 05/04/1961
- P.L. 87-59 Enacted 06/27/1961
- P.L. 87-61 Enacted 06/29/1961 Federal-Aid Highway Act of 1961
- P.L. 87-64 Enacted 06/30/1961 Social Security Amendments of 1961
- P.L. 87-72 Enacted 06/30/1961 Tax Rate Extension Act of 1961
- P.L. 87-109 Enacted 07/26/1961
- P.L. 87-256 Enacted 09/21/1961 Mutual Educational and Cultural Exchange Act of 1961
- P.L. 87-293 Enacted 09/22/1961 Peace Corps Act
- P.L. 87-321 Enacted 09/26/1961
- P.L. 87-370 Enacted 10/04/1961
- P.L. 87-397 Enacted 10/05/1961
- P.L. 87-403 Enacted 02/02/1962
- P.L. 87-426 Enacted 03/31/1962
- P.L. 87-456 Enacted 05/24/1962 Tariff Classification Act of 1962
- P.L. 87-508 Enacted 06/28/1962 Tax Rate Extension Act of 1962
- P.L. 87-535 Enacted 07/13/1962 Sugar Act Amendments of 1962
- P.L. 87-682 Enacted 09/25/1962
- P.L. 87-710 Enacted 09/27/1962
- P.L. 87-722 Enacted 09/28/1962
- P.L. 87-768 Enacted 10/09/1962
- P.L. 87-770 Enacted 10/09/1962
- P.L. 87-790 Enacted 10/10/1962
- P.L. 87-792 Enacted 10/10/1962 Self-Employed Individuals Tax Retirement Act of 1962
- P.L. 87-794 Enacted 10/11/1962 Trade Expansion Act of 1962
- P.L. 87-834 Enacted 10/16/1962 Revenue Act of 1962
- P.L. 87-858 Enacted 10/23/1962
- P.L. 87-863 Enacted 10/23/1962
- P.L. 87-870 Enacted 10/23/1962
- P.L. 87-876 Enacted 10/24/1962
- P.L. 88-4 Enacted 04/02/1963
- P.L. 88-9 Enacted 04/10/1963
- P.L. 88-31 Enacted 05/29/1963
- P.L. 88-36 Enacted 06/04/1963
- P.L. 88-52 Enacted 06/29/1963 Tax Rate Extension Act of 1963
- P.L. 88-133 Enacted 10/05/1963
- P.L. 88-173 Enacted 11/07/1963
- P.L. 88-272 Enacted 02/26/1964 Revenue Act of 1964
- P.L. 88-342 Enacted 06/30/1964
- P.L. 88-348 Enacted 06/30/1964 Excise Tax Rate Extension Act of 1964
- P.L. 88-380 Enacted 07/17/1964
- P.L. 88-426 Enacted 08/14/1964 Government Employees Salary Act of 1964
- P.L. 88-484 Enacted 08/22/1964
- P.L. 88-539 Enacted 08/31/1963
- P.L. 88-554 Enacted 08/31/1964
- P.L. 88-563 Enacted 09/02/1964 Interest Equalization Tax Act
- P.L. 88-570 Enacted 09/02/1964
- P.L. 88-571 Enacted 09/02/1964
- P.L. 88-650 Enacted 10/13/1964
- P.L. 88-653 Enacted 10/13/1964
- P.L. 89-44 Enacted 06/21/1965 Excise Tax Reduction Act of 1965
- P.L. 89-97 Enacted 07/30/1965 Social Security Amendments of 1965
- P.L. 89-212 Enacted 09/29/1965
- P.L. 89-243 Enacted 10/09/1965 Interest Equalization Tax Extension Act of 1965
- P.L. 89-331 Enacted 11/08/1965 Sugar Act Amendments of 1965
- P.L. 89-352 Enacted 02/02/1966
- P.L. 89-354 Enacted 02/02/1966
- P.L. 89-365 Enacted 03/08/1966
- P.L. 89-368 Enacted 03/15/1966 Tax Adjustment Act of 1966
- P.L. 89-384 Enacted 04/08/1966
- P.L. 89-389 Enacted 04/14/1966
- P.L. 89-493 Enacted 07/05/1966
- P.L. 89-523 Enacted 08/01/1966
- P.L. 89-570 Enacted 09/12/1966
- P.L. 89-621 Enacted 10/04/1966
- P.L. 89-699 Enacted 10/30/1966
- P.L. 87-700 Enacted 10/30/1966
- P.L. 89-713 Enacted 11/02/1966
- P.L. 89-719 Enacted 11/02/1966 Federal Tax Lien Act of 1966
- P.L. 89-721 Enacted 11/02/1966
- P.L. 89-722 Enacted 11/02/1966
- P.L. 89-739 Enacted 11/08/1966
- P.L. 89-793 Enacted 11/08/1966
- P.L. 89-800 Enacted 11/08/1966
- P.L. 89-809 Enacted 11/13/1966 Foreign Investors Tax Act of 1966
- P.L. 90-26 Enacted 06/13/1967
- P.L. 90-59 Enacted 07/31/1967 Interest Equalization Tax Extension Act of 1967
- P.L. 90-73 Enacted 08/29/1967
- P.L. 90-78 Enacted 08/31/1967
- P.L. 90-225 Enacted 12/27/1967
- P.L. 90-240 Enacted 01/02/1968
- P.L. 90-248 Enacted 01/02/1968 Social Security Amendments of 1967
- P.L. 90-285 Enacted 04/12/1968
- P.L. 90-346 Enacted 06/18/1968
- P.L. 90-364 Enacted 06/28/1968 Revenue and Expenditure Control Act of 1968
- P.L. 90-607 Enacted 10/21/1968
- P.L. 90-615 Enacted 10/21/1968
- P.L. 90-618 Enacted 10/22/1968 Gun Control Act of 1968
- P.L. 90-619 Enacted 10/22/1968
- P.L. 90-621 Enacted 10/22/1968
- P.L. 90-622 Enacted 10/22/1968
- P.L. 90-624 Enacted 10/22/1968
- P.L. 90-634 Enacted 10/24/1968 Renegotiation Amendments Act of 1968
- P.L. 91-36 Enacted 06/30/1968
- P.L. 91-50 Enacted 08/02/1969
- P.L. 91-53 Enacted 08/07/1969
- P.L. 91-65 Enacted 08/25/1969
- P.L. 91-128 Enacted 11/26/1969 Interest Equalization Tax Extension Act of 1969
- P.L. 91-172 Enacted 12/30/1969 Tax Reform Act of 1969

== 1970s ==
- P.L. 91-215 Enacted 03/17/1970
- P.L. 91-258 Enacted 05/21/1970 Airport and Airway Revenue Act of 1970
- P.L. 91-373 Enacted 08/10/1970 Employment Security Amendments of 1970
- P.L. 91-420 Enacted 09/25/1970
- P.L. 91-513 Enacted 10/27/1970
- P.L. 91-518 Enacted 10/30/1970 Rail Passenger Service Act of 1970
- P.L. 91-605 Enacted 12/31/1970 Federal-Aid Highway Act of 1970
- P.L. 91-606 Enacted 12/31/1970 Disaster Relief Act of 1970
- P.L. 91-614 Enacted 12/31/1970 Excise, Estate, and Gift Tax Adjustment Act of 1970
- P.L. 91-618 Enacted 12/31/1970
- P.L. 91-659 Enacted 01/08/1971
- P.L. 91-673 Enacted 01/12/1971
- P.L. 91-676 Enacted 01/12/1971
- P.L. 91-677 Enacted 01/12/1971
- P.L. 91-678 Enacted 01/12/1971
- P.L. 91-679 Enacted 01/12/1971
- P.L. 91-680 Enacted 01/12/1971
- P.L. 91-681 Enacted 01/12/1971
- P.L. 91-683 Enacted 01/12/1971
- P.L. 91-684 Enacted 01/12/1971
- P.L. 91-686 Enacted 01/12/1971
- P.L. 91-687 Enacted 01/12/1971
- P.L. 91-688 Enacted 01/12/1971
- P.L. 91-691 Enacted 01/12/1971
- P.L. 91-693 Enacted 01/12/1971
- P.L. 92-5 Enacted 03/17/1971
- P.L. 92-9 Enacted 04/01/1971 Interest Equalization Tax Extension Act of 1971
- P.L. 92-41 Enacted 07/01/1971
- P.L. 92-138 Enacted 10/14/1971 Sugar Act Amendments of 1971
- P.L. 92-178 Enacted 12/10/1971 Revenue Act of 1971
- P.L. 92-279 Enacted 04/26/1972
- P.L. 92-310 Enacted 06/06/1972
- P.L. 92-329 Enacted 06/30/1972
- P.L. 92-336 Enacted 07/01/1972
- P.L. 92-418 Enacted 08/29/1972
- P.L. 92-512 Enacted 10/20/1972 State and Local Fiscal Assistance Act of 1972
- P.L. 92-558 Enacted 10/25/1972
- P.L. 92-580 Enacted 10/27/1972
- P.L. 92-603 Enacted 10/30/1972 Social Security Amendments of 1972
- P.L. 92-606 Enacted 10/31/1972
- P.L. 93-17 Enacted 04/10/1973 Interest Equalization Tax Extension Act of 1973
- P.L. 93-53 Enacted 07/01/1973
- P.L. 93-66 Enacted 07/09/1973
- P.L. 93-69 Enacted 07/10/1973
- P.L. 93-233 Enacted 12/31/1973
- P.L. 93-288 Enacted 05/22/1974 Disaster Relief Act of 1974
- P.L. 93-310 Enacted 06/08/1974
- P.L. 93-368 Enacted 08/07/1974
- P.L. 93-406 Enacted 09/02/1974 Employee Retirement Income Security Act of 1974
- P.L. 93-443 Enacted 10/15/1974 Federal Election Campaign Act Amendments of 1974
- P.L. 93-445 Enacted 10/16/1974
- P.L. 93-480 Enacted 10/26/1974
- P.L. 93-482 Enacted 10/26/1974
- P.L. 93-483 Enacted 10/26/1974
- P.L. 93-490 Enacted 10/26/1974
- P.L. 93-499 Enacted 10/29/1974
- P.L. 93-597 Enacted 01/02/1975
- P.L. 93-625 Enacted 01/03/1975
- P.L. 94-12 Enacted 03/29/1975 Tax Reduction Act of 1975
- P.L. 94-45 Enacted 06/30/1975 Emergency Compensation and Special Unemployment Assistance Extension Act of 1975
- P.L. 94-81 Enacted 08/09/1975
- P.L. 94-92 Enacted 08/09/1975
- P.L. 94-93 Enacted 08/09/1975
- P.L. 94-164 Enacted 12/23/1975 Revenue Adjustment Act of 1975
- PL 94-182 Enacted 12/31/1975 Education For All Handicapped Children Act
- P.L. 94-202 Enacted 01/02/1976
- P.L. 94-253 Enacted 03/31/1976
- P.L. 94-267 Enacted 04/15/1976
- P.L. 94-273 Enacted 04/21/1976 Fiscal Year Adjustment Act
- P.L. 94-280 Enacted 05/05/1976
- P.L. 94-283 Enacted 05/11/1976 Federal Election Campaign Act Amendments of 1976
- P.L. 94-331 Enacted 06/30/1976
- P.L. 94-396 Enacted 09/03/1976
- P.L. 94-401 Enacted 09/07/1976
- P.L. 94-414 Enacted 09/17/1976
- P.L. 94-452 Enacted 10/02/1976 Bank Holding Company Tax Act of 1976
- P.L. 94-455 Enacted 10/04/1976 Tax Reform Act of 1976
- P.L. 94-514 Enacted 10/15/1976
- P.L. 94-528 Enacted 10/17/1976
- P.L. 94-529 Enacted 10/17/1976
- P.L. 94-530 Enacted 10/17/1976
- P.L. 94-547 Enacted 10/18/1976
- P.L. 94-553 Enacted 10/19/1976 Copyrights Act
- P.L. 94-563 Enacted 10/19/1976
- P.L. 94-566 Enacted 10/20/1976 Unemployment Compensation Amendments of 1976
- P.L. 94-568 Enacted 10/20/1976
- P.L. 94-569 Enacted 10/20/1976
- P.L. 95-19 Enacted 04/12/1977 Emergency Unemployment Compensation Act of 1977
- P.L. 95-30 Enacted 05/23/77 Tax Reduction and Simplification Act of 1977
- P.L. 95-147 Enacted 10/28/77
- P.L. 95-171 Enacted 11/12/77
- P.L. 95-172 Enacted 11/12/77
- P.L. 95-176 Enacted 11/14/77
- P.L. 95-210 Enacted 12/13/77
- P.L. 95-216 Enacted 12/20/77
- P.L. 95-227 Enacted 02/10/78 Black Lung Benefits Revenue Act of 1977
- P.L. 95-339 Enacted 08/08/78 New York City Loan Guarantee Act of 1978
- P.L. 95-345 Enacted 08/15/78
- P.L. 95-423 Enacted 10/06/78
- P.L. 95-427 Enacted 10/07/78
- P.L. 95-458 Enacted 10/14/78
- P.L. 95-472 Enacted 10/17/78
- P.L. 95-473 Enacted 10/17/78
- P.L. 95-479 Enacted 10/18/78 Veterans' Disability Compensation and Survivors' Benefits Act of 1978
- P.L. 95-488 Enacted 10/20/78
- P.L. 95-502 Enacted 10/21/78 Inland Waterways Revenue Act of 1978
- P.L. 95-599 Enacted 11/06/78 Surface Transportation Assistance Act of 1978
- P.L. 95-600 Enacted 10/06/78 Revenue Act of 1978
- P.L. 95-615 Enacted 11/08/78 Tax Treatment Extension Act of 1978
- P.L. 95-618 Enacted 11/09/78 Energy Tax Act of 1978
- P.L. 95-628 Enacted 11/10/78
- P.L. 96-39 Enacted 07/26/79 Trade Agreements Act of 1979
- P.L. 96-72 Enacted 09/29/79 Export Administration Act of 1979
- P.L. 96-84 Enacted 10/10/79
- P.L. 96-167 Enacted 12/29/79

== 1980s ==
- P.L. 96-178 Enacted 01/02/80
- P.L. 96-187 Enacted 01/08/80 Federal Election Campaign Act Amendments of 1979
- P.L. 96-222 Enacted 04/01/80 Technical Corrections Act of 1979
- P.L. 96-223 Enacted 04/02/80 Crude Oil Windfall Profit Tax Act of 1980
- P.L. 96-249 Enacted 05/26/80 Food Stamp Act Amendments of 1980
- P.L. 96-265 Enacted 06/09/80 Social Security Disability Amendments of 1980
- P.L. 96-272 Enacted 06/17/80 Adoption Assistance and Child Welfare Act of 1980
- P.L. 96-283 Enacted 06/28/80 Deep Seabed Hard Mineral Resource Act
- P.L. 96-298 Enacted 07/01/80
- P.L. 96-364 Enacted 09/26/80 Multiemployer Pension Plan Amendments Act of 1980
- P.L. 96-417 Enacted 10/10/80 Customs Courts Act of 1980
- P.L. 96-439 Enacted 10/13/80
- P.L. 96-451 Enacted 10/14/80 Recreational Boating Safety and Facilities Improvement Act of 1980
- P.L. 96-454 Enacted 10/15/80 Household Goods Transportation Act of 1980
- P.L. 96-465 Enacted 10/17/80 Foreign Service Act of 1980
- P.L. 96-471 Enacted 10/19/80 Installment Sales Revision Act of 1980
- P.L. 96-499 Enacted 12/05/80 Omnibus Reconciliation Act of 1980
- P.L. 96-510 Enacted 12/11/80 Comprehensive Environmental Response, Compensation, and Liability Act of 1980
- P.L. 96-541 Enacted 12/17/80
- P.L. 96-589 Enacted 12/24/80 Bankruptcy Tax Act of 1980
- P.L. 96-595 Enacted 12/24/80
- P.L. 96-596 Enacted 12/24/80
- P.L. 96-598 Enacted 12/24/80
- P.L. 96-601 Enacted 12/24/80
- P.L. 96-603 Enacted 12/28/80
- P.L. 96-605 Enacted 12/28/80 Miscellaneous Revenue Act of 1980
- P.L. 96-608 Enacted 12/28/80
- P.L. 96-613 Enacted 12/28/80
- P.L. 97-34 Enacted 08/13/81 Economic Recovery Tax Act of 1981
- P.L. 97-35 Enacted 08/13/81 Omnibus Budget Reconciliation Act of 1981
- P.L. 97-51 Enacted 10/01/81
- P.L. 97-119 Enacted 12/29/81 Black Lung Benefits Revenue Act of 1981
- P.L. 97-123 Enacted 12/29/81
- P.L. 97-164 Enacted 04/02/82 Federal Courts Improvement Act of 1982
- P.L. 97-216 Enacted 07/18/82 Urgent Supplemental Appropriations Act, 1982
- P.L. 97-248 Enacted 09/03/82 Tax Equity and Fiscal Responsibility Act of 1982
- P.L. 97-258 Enacted 09/13/82
- P.L. 97-261 Enacted 09/20/82 Bus Regulatory Reform Act of 1982
- P.L. 97-354 Enacted 10/19/82 Subchapter S Revision Act of 1982
- P.L. 97-362 Enacted 10/25/82 Miscellaneous Revenue Act of 1982
- P.L. 97-365 Enacted 10/25/82 Debt Collection Act of 1982
- P.L. 97-414 Enacted 01/04/83 Orphan Drug Act
- P.L. 97-424 Enacted 01/06/83 Surface Transportation Assistance Act of 1982
- P.L. 97-448 Enacted 01/12/83 Technical Corrections Act of 1982
- P.L. 97-449 Enacted 01/12/83
- P.L. 97-452 Enacted 01/12/83
- P.L. 97-455 Enacted 01/12/83
- P.L. 97-473 Enacted 01/14/83
- P.L. 98-21 Enacted 04/20/83 Social Security Amendments of 1983
- P.L. 98-67 Enacted 08/05/83 Interest and Dividend Tax Compliance Act of 1983
- P.L. 98-76 Enacted 08/12/83 Railroad Retirement Solvency Act of 1983
- P.L. 98-135 Enacted 10/24/83 Federal Supplemental Compensation Amendments of 1983
- P.L. 98-213 Enacted 12/08/83
- P.L. 98-216 Enacted 02/14/84
- P.L. 98-259 Enacted 04/10/84
- P.L. 98-355 Enacted 07/11/84
- P.L. 98-369 Enacted 07/18/84 Deficit Reduction Act of 1984
- P.L. 98-378 Enacted 08/16/84 Child Support Enforcement Amendments of 1984
- P.L. 98-397 Enacted 08/23/84 Retirement Equity Act of 1984
- P.L. 98-443 Enacted 10/04/84 Civil Aeronautics Board Sunset Act of 1984
- P.L. 98-473 Enacted 10/12/84
- P.L. 98-573 Enacted 10/30/84
- P.L. 98-611 Enacted 10/31/84
- P.L. 98-612 Enacted 10/31/84
- P.L. 98-620 Enacted 11/08/84
- P.L. 99-44 Enacted 05/24/85
- P.L. 99-92 Enacted 08/16/85
- P.L. 99-121 Enacted 10/11/85
- P.L. 99-221 Enacted 12/26/85 Cherokee Leasing Act
- P.L. 99-234 Enacted 01/02/86 Federal Civilian Employee and Contractor Travel Expenses Act of 1985
- P.L. 99-272 Enacted 04/07/86 Consolidated Omnibus Budget Reconciliation Act of 1985
- P.L. 99-308 Enacted 05/19/86 Firearms Owner's Protection Act
- P.L. 99-335 Enacted 06/06/86
- P.L. 99-386 Enacted 08/22/86 Congressional Reports Elimination Act of 1986
- P.L. 99-499 Enacted 10/17/86 Superfund Amendments and Reauthorization Act of 1986
- P.L. 99-509 Enacted 10/21/86 Omnibus Amendments and Reauthorization Act of 1986
- P.L. 99-514 Enacted 10/22/86 Tax Reform Act of 1986
- P.L. 99-595 Enacted 10/31/86
- P.L. 99-640 Enacted 11/10/86 Coast Guard Authorization Act of 1986
- P.L. 99-662 Enacted 11/17/86 Water Resources Development Act of 1986
- P.L. 100-17 Enacted 04/02/87 Surface Transportation and Uniform Relocation Assistance Act of 1987
- P.L. 100-202 Enacted 12/22/87 Continuing Appropriations, Fiscal Year 1988
- P.L. 100-203 Enacted 12/22/87 Revenue Act of 1987
- P.L. 100-223 Enacted 12/30/87 Airport and Airway Revenue Act of 1987
- P.L. 100-360 Enacted 07/01/88 Medicare Catastrophic Coverage Act of 1988
- P.L. 100-418 Enacted 08/23/88 Omnibus Trade and Competitiveness Act of 1988
- P.L. 100-448 Enacted 09/28/88 Coast Guard Authorization Act of 1988
- P.L. 100-485 Enacted 10/13/88 Family Support Act of 1988
- P.L. 100-647 Enacted 11/10/88 Technical and Miscellaneous Revenue Act of 1988
- P.L. 100-690 Enacted 11/18/88 Anti-Drug Abuse Act of 1988
- P.L. 100-707 Enacted 11/23/88 Disaster Relief and Emergency Assistance Amendments of 1988
- P.L. 101-73 Enacted 08/09/89 Financial Institutions Reform, Recovery, and Enforcement Act of 1989
- P.L. 101-140 Enacted 11/08/89
- P.L. 101-194 Enacted 11/30/89 Ethics Reform Act of 1989
- P.L. 101-221 Enacted 12/12/89 Steel Trade Liberalization Program Implementation Act
- P.L. 101-234 Enacted 12/13/89 Medicare Catastrophic Coverage Repeal Act of 1989
- P.L. 101-239 Enacted 12/19/89 Omnibus Budget Reconciliation Act of 1989

== 1990s ==
- P.L. 101-280 Enacted 05/04/90
- P.L. 101-380 Enacted 08/18/90 Oil Pollution Act of 1990
- P.L. 101-382 Enacted 08/20/90 Customs and Trade Act of 1990
- P.L. 101-508 Enacted 11/05/90 Omnibus Budget Reconciliation Act of 1990
- P.L. 101-624 Enacted 11/28/90 Food, Agriculture, Conservation, and Trade Act of 1990
- P.L. 101-647 Enacted 11/29/90 Crime Control Act of 1990
- P.L. 101-649 Enacted 11/29/90 Immigration Act of 1990
- P.L. 102-02 Enacted 01/30/91
- P.L. 102-90 Enacted 08/14/91 Legislative Branche Appropriation Act
- P.L. 102-164 Enacted 11/15/91 Emergency Unemployment Compensation Act of 1991
- P.L. 102-227 Enacted 12/11/91 Tax Extension Act of 1991
- P.L. 102-240 Enacted 12/18/91 Intermodal Surface Transportation Efficiency Act of 1991
- P.L. 102-244 Enacted 02/07/92
- P.L. 102-318 Enacted 07/03/92 Unemployment Compensation Amendments of 1992
- P.L. 102-393 Enacted 10/06/92 Treasury, Postal Service, and General Government Appropriations Act, 1993
- P.L. 102-486 Enacted 10/24/92 Energy Policy Act of 1992
- P.L. 102-568 Enacted 10/29/92 Veterans' Benefits Act of 1992
- P.L. 102-572 Enacted 10/29/92 Court of Federal Claims Technical and Procedural Improvements Act of 1992
- P.L. 102-581 Enacted 10/31/92 Airport and Airway Safety, Capacity, Noise Improvement, and Intermodal Transportation Act of 1992
- P.L. 103-66 Enacted 08/10/93 Omnibus Budget Reconciliation Act of 1993
- P.L. 103-149 Enacted 11/22/93 South African Democratic Transition Support Act of 1993
- P.L. 103-178 Enacted 12/03/93 Intelligence Authorization Act for Fiscal Year 1994
- P.L. 103-182 Enacted 12/08/1993 North American Free Trade Agreement Implementation Act
- P.L. 103-260 Enacted 05/26/94 Airport Improvement Program Temporary Extension Act of 1994
- P.L. 103-272 Enacted 07/05/94
- P.L. 103-296 Enacted 08/15/94 Social Security Independence and Program Improvements Act of 1994
- P.L. 103-305 Enacted 08/23/1994 Federal Aviation Administration Authorization Act of 1994
- P.L. 103-322 Enacted 09/13/94 Violent Crime Control and Law Enforcement Act of 1994
- P.L. 103-337 Enacted 10/05/94 National Defense Authorizations Act for Fiscal Year 1995
- P.L. 103-387 Enacted 10/22/94 Social Security Domestic Employment Reform Act of 1994
- P.L. 103-429 Enacted 01/31/94
- P.L. 103-465 Enacted 12/08/94 Uruguay Round Agreements Act
- P.L. 104-7 Enacted 04/11/95 Self-Employed Health Insurance Act
- P.L. 104-88 Enacted 12/29/95 ICC Termination Act of 1995
- P.L. 104-117 Enacted 03/20/96
- P.L. 104-134 Enacted 04/26/96 Debt collection Improvement Act of 1996
- P.L. 104-168 Enacted 07/30/96 Taxpayer Bill of Rights 2
- P.L. 104-188 Enacted 08/20/96 Small Business Job Protection Act 1996
- P.L. 104-191 Enacted 08/21/96 Health Insurance Portability And Accountability Act of 1996
- P.L. 104-193 Enacted 08/22/96 Personal Responsibility and Work Opportunity Reconciliation Act of 1996
- P.L. 104-201 Enacted 09/23/96 National Defense Authorization Act for Fiscal Year 1997
- P.L. 104-208 Enacted 09/30/96 Deposit Insurance Funds Act of 1996
- P.L. 104-264 Enacted 10/09/96 Federal Aviation Reauthorization Act of 1996
- P.L. 104-303 Enacted 10/12/96 Water Resources Development Act of 1996
- P.L. 104-316 Enacted 10/19/16 General Accounting Office Act of 1996
- P.L. 105-2 Enacted 02/28/97 Airport and Airway Trust Fund Tax Reinstatement Act of 1997
- P.L. 105-33 Enacted 08/05/97 Balanced Budget Act of 1997
- P.L. 105-34 Enacted 08/05/97 Taxpayer Relief Act of 1997
- P.L. 105-35 Enacted 08/05/97 Taxpayer Browsing Protection Act
- P.L. 105-61 Enacted 10/10/97 Treasury and General Government Appropriations Act, 1998
- P.L. 105-65 Enacted 10/27/97 Departments of Veterans Affairs and Housing and Urban Development, and Independent Agencies Appropriations Act, 1998
- P.L. 105-78 Enacted 11/13/97 Departments of Labor, Health and Human Services and Education, and Related Agencies Appropriations Act, 1998
- P.L. 105-102 Enacted 11/20/97
- P.L. 105-115 Enacted 11/21/97 Food and Drug Administration (FDA) Modernization Act of 1997
- P.L. 105-130 Enacted 12/01/97 Surface Transportation Extension Act of 1997
- P.L. 105-178 Enacted 06/09/98 Transportation Equity Act for the 21st Century
- P.L. 105-206 Enacted 07/22/98 Internal Revenue Service Restructuring and Reform Act of 1998
- P.L. 105-261 Enacted 10/17/98
- P.L. 105-277 Enacted 10/21/98 Tax and Trade Relief Extension Act of 1998, Vaccine Injury Compensation Program Modification Act
- P.L. 105-306 Enacted 10/28/98 Noncitizen Benefit Clarification and Other Technical Amendments Act of 1998
- P.L. 106-21 Enacted 04/19/99
- P.L. 106-36 Enacted 06/25/99 Miscellaneous trade and Technical Corrections Act of 1999
- P.L. 106-78 Enacted 10/22/99 Agriculture, Rural Development, Food and Drug Administration, and Related Agencies Appropriations Act, 2000
- P.L. 106-170 Enacted 12/17/99 Tax Relief Extension Act of 1999

== 2000s ==
- P.L. 106-181 Enacted 04/05/00 Wendell H. Ford Aviation Investment and Reform Act for the 21st Century
- P.L. 106-200 Enacted 05/18/00 Trade and Development Act of 2000
- P.L. 106-230 Enacted 07/01/00
- P.L. 106-400 Enacted 10/30/00 McKinney-Vento Homeless Assistance Act
- P.L. 106-408 Enacted 11/01/00 Wildlife and Sport Fish Restoration Programs Improvement Act of 2000
- P.L. 106-476 Enacted 11/09/00 Imported Cigarette Compliance Act of 2000
- P.L. 106-519 Enacted 11/15/00 FSC Repeal and Extraterritorial Income Exclusion Act of 2000
- P.L. 106-554 Enacted 12/21/00 Community Renewal Tax Relief Act of 2000
- P.L. 106-573 Enacted 12/28/00 Installment tax Correction Act of 2000
- P.L. 107-15 Enacted 06/05/01 Fallen Hero Survivor Benefit Fairness Act of 2001
- P.L. 107-16 Enacted 06/07/01 Economic Growth and Tax Relief Reconciliation Act of 2001
- P.L. 107-22 Enacted 7/26/01
- P.L. 107-71 Enacted 11/19/01 Aviation and Transportation Security Act
- P.L. 107-90 Enacted 12/21/01 Railroad Retirement and Survivors' Improvement Act of 2001
- P.L. 107-110 Enacted 01/08/02 No Child Left Behind Act of 2001
- P.L. 107-116 Enacted 01/10/02 Departments of Labor, Health, and Human Services, and Education, and Related Agencies Appropriations Act, 2002
- P.L. 107-131 Enacted 01/16/02
- P.L. 107-134 Enacted 01/23/02 Victims of Terrorism Tax Relief Act of 2001
- P.L. 107-147 Enacted 03/09/02 Job Creation and Worker Assistance Act of 2002
- P.L. 107-181 Enacted 05/20/02 Clergy Housing Allowance Clarification Act of 2002
- P.L. 107-210 Enacted 08/06/02 Trade Act of 2002
- P.L. 107-217 Enacted 08/21/02
- P.L. 107-276 Enacted 11/02/02
- P.L. 107-296 Enacted 11/25/02 Homeland Security Act of 2002
- P.L. 107-330 Enacted 12/06/02 Veterans Benefits Act of 2002
- P.L. 108-27 Enacted 05/28/03 Jobs and Growth Tax Relief Reconciliation Act of 2003
- P.L. 108-88 Enacted 09/30/03 Surface Transportation Extension Act of 2003
- P.L. 108-89 Enacted 10/01/03
- P.L. 108-121 Enacted 11/11/03 Military Family Tax Relief Act of 2003
- P.L. 108-173 Enacted 12/08/03 Medicare Prescription Drug, Improvement, and Modernization Act of 2003
- P.L. 108-176 Enacted 12/12/03 Vision 100--Century of Aviation Reauthorization Act
- P.L. 108-178 Enacted 12/15/03
- P.L. 108-189 Enacted 12/19/03
- P.L. 108-202 Enacted 02/29/04 Surface Transportation Extension Act of 2004
- P.L. 108-203 Enacted 03/02/04 Social Security Protection Act of 2004
- P.L. 108-218 Enacted 04/10/04 Pension Funding Equity Act of 2004
- P.L. 108-224 Enacted 04/30/04 Surface Transportation Extension Act of 2004, Part II
- P.L. 108-263 Enacted 06/30/04 Surface Transportation Extension Act of 2004, Part III
- P.L. 108-280 Enacted 07/30/04 Surface Transportation Extension Act of 2004, Part IV
- P.L. 108-310 Enacted 09/30/04 Surface Transportation Extension Act of 2004, Part V
- P.L. 108-311 Enacted 10/04/04 Working Families Tax Relief Act of 2004
- P.L. 108-357 Enacted 10/22/04 American Jobs Creation Act of 2004
- P.L. 108-375 Enacted 10/28/04 Ronald W. Reagan National Defense Authorization Act for Fiscal Year 2005
- P.L. 108-429 Enacted 12/03/04 Miscellaneous Trade and Technical Corrections Act of 2004
- P.L. 108-493 Enacted 12/23/04
- P.L. 109-6 Enacted 03/31/05
- P.L. 109-7 Enacted 04/15/05
- P.L. 109-14 Enacted 05/31/05 Surface Transportation Extension Act of 2005
- P.L. 109-20 Enacted 07/01/05 Surface Transportation Extension Act of 2005, Part II
- P.L. 109-35 Enacted 07/20/05 Surface Transportation Extension Act of 2005, Part III
- P.L. 109-37 Enacted 07/22/05 Surface Transportation Extension Act of 2005, Part IV
- P.L. 109-40 Enacted 07/28/05 Surface Transportation Extension Act of 2005, Part V
- P.L. 109-42 Enacted 07/30/05 Surface Transportation Extension Act of 2005, Part VI
- P.L. 109-58 Enacted 08/08/05 Energy Tax Incentives Act of 2005
- P.L. 109-59 Enacted 08/10/05 Safe, Accountable, Flexible, Efficient Transportation Equity Act: A Legacy for Users
- P.L. 109-73 Enacted 09/23/05 Katrina Emergency Tax Relief Act of 2005
- P.L. 109-74 Enacted 09/29/05 Sportfishing and Recreational Boating Safety Amendments Act of 2005
- P.L. 109-135 Enacted 12/21/05 Gulf Opportunity Zone Act of 2005
- P.L. 109-151 Enacted 12/30/05
- P.L. 109-171 Enacted 02/08/06 Deficit Reduction Act of 2005
- P.L. 109-222 Enacted 05/17/06 Tax Increase Prevention and Reconciliation Act of 2005
- P.L. 109-227 Enacted 05/29/06 Heroes Earned Retirement Opportunities Act
- P.L. 109-241 Enacted 07/11/06 Coast Guard and Maritime Transportation Act of 2006
- P.L. 109-280 Enacted 08/17/06 Pension Protection Act of 2006
- P.L. 109-304 Enacted 10/06/06
- P.L. 109-432 Enacted 12/20/06 Tax Relief and Health Care Act of 2006
- P.L. 109-433 Enacted 12/20/06
- P.L. 110-28 Enacted 05/25/07 U.S. Troop Readiness, Veterans' Care, Katrina Recovery, and Iraq Accountability Appropriations Act, 2007; Small Business and Work Opportunity Tax Act of 2007
- P.L. 110-92 Enacted 09/29/07
- P.L. 110-140 Enacted 12/19/07 Energy Independence and Security Act of 2007
- P.L. 110-142 Enacted 12/20/07 Mortgage Forgiveness Debt Relief Act of 2007
- P.L. 110-161 Enacted 12/26/07 Department of Transportation Appropriations Act, 2008
- P.L. 110-166 Enacted 12/26/07 Tax Increase Prevention Act of 2007
- P.L. 110-172 Enacted 12/29/07 Tax Technical Corrections Act of 2007
- P.L. 110-176 Enacted 01/04/08
- P.L. 110-177 Enacted 01/07/08 Court Security Improvement Act of 2007
- P.L. 110-185 Enacted 02/13/08 Economic Stimulus Act of 2008
- P.L. 110-190 Enacted 02/28/08 Airport and Airway Extension Act of 2008
- P.L. 110-233 Enacted 05/21/08 Genetic Information Nondiscrimination Act of 2008
- P.L. 110-234 Enacted 05/22/2008 Food, Conservation, and Energy Act of 2008
- P.L. 110-244 Enacted 06/06/08 SAFETEA-LU Technical Corrections Act of 2008
- P.L. 110-245 Enacted 06/17/08 Heroes Earnings Assistance and Relief Tax Act of 2008
- P.L. 110-246 Enacted 06/18/08 Heartland, Habitat, Harvest, and Horticulture Act of 2008
- P.L. 110-253 Enacted 06/30/08 Federal Aviation Administration Extension Act of 2008
- P.L. 110-289 Enacted 07/30/08 Housing Assistance Tax Act of 2008; Federal Housing Finance Regulatory Reform Act of 2008
- P.L. 110-317 Enacted 08/29/08 Hubbard Act
- P.L. 110-318 Enacted 09/15/08
- P.L. 110-328 Enacted 09/30/08 SSI Extension for Elderly and Disabled Refugees Act
- P.L. 110-330 Enacted 09/30/08 Federal Aviation Administration Extension Act of 2008, Part II
- P.L. 110-343 Enacted 10/03/08 Emergency Economic Stabilization Act of 2008; Energy Improvement and Extension Act of 2008; Tax Extenders and Alternative Minimum Tax Relief Act of 2008; Paul Wellstone and Pete Domenici Mental Health Parity and Addiction Equity Act of 2008; Heartland Disaster Tax Relief Act of 2008
- P.L. 110-351 Enacted 10/07/08 Fostering Connections to Success and Increasing Adoptions Act of 2008
- P.L. 110-381 Enacted 10/09/08 Michelle's Law
- P.L. 110-428 Enacted 10/15/08 Inmate Tax Fraud Prevention Act of 2008
- P.L. 110-458 Enacted 12/23/08 Worker, Retiree, and Employer Recovery Act of 2008
- P.L. 111-3 Enacted 02/04/09 Children's Health Insurance Program Reauthorization Act of 2009
- P.L. 111-5 Enacted 02/17/09 American Recovery and Reinvestment Tax Act of 2009
- P.L. 111-8 Enacted 03/11/09 Omnibus Appropriation Act, 2009
- P.L. 111-12 Enacted 03/30/09 Federal Aviation Administration Extension Act of 2009
- P.L. 111-46 Enacted 08/07/09
- P.L. 111-68 Enacted 10/01/09
- P.L. 111-69 Enacted 10/01/09 Fiscal Year 2010 Federal Aviation Administration Extension Act
- P.L. 111-88 Enacted 10/30/09
- P.L. 111-92 Enacted 11/06/09 Worker, Homeownership, and Business Assistance Act of 2009
- P.L. 111-116 Enacted 12/16/09 Fiscal Year 2010 Federal Aviation Administration Extension Act, Part II

== 2010s ==
- P.L. 111-144 Enacted 03/02/10 Temporary Extension Act of 2010
- P.L. 111-147 Enacted 03/18/10 Hiring Incentives to Restore Employment Act
- P.L. 111-148 Enacted 03/23/10 Patient Protection and Affordable Care Act
- P.L. 111-152 Enacted 03/30/10 Health Care and Education Reconciliation Act of 2010
- P.L. 111-153 Enacted 03/31/10 Federal Aviation Administration Extension Act of 2010
- P.L. 111-159 Enacted 04/26/10 TRICARE Affirmation Act
- P.L. 111-161 Enacted 04/30/10 Airport and Airway Extension Act of 2010
- P.L. 111-173 Enacted 05/27/10
- P.L. 111-192 Enacted 06/25/10 Preservation of Access to Care for Medicare Beneficiaries and Pension Relief Act of 2010
- P.L. 111-197 Enacted 07/02/10 Airport and Airway Extension Act of 2010, Part II
- P.L. 111-198 Enacted 07/02/10 Homebuyer Assistance and Improvement Act of 2010
- P.L. 111-203 Enacted 07/21/10 Dodd-Frank Wall street Reform and Consumer Protection Act
- P.L. 111-216 Enacted 08/01/10 Airline Safety and Federal Aviation Administration Extension Act of 2010
- P.L. 111-226 Enacted 08/10/10
- P.L. 111-237 Enacted 08/16/10 Firearms Excise Tax Improvement Act of 2010
- P.L. 111-240 Enacted 09/27/10 Creating Small Business Jobs Act of 2010
- P.L. 111-249 Enacted 09/30/10 Airport and Airway Extension Act of 2010, Part III
- P.L. 111-291 Enacted 12/08/10 Claims Resolution Act of 2010
- P.L. 111-309 Enacted 12/15/10 Medicare and Medicaid Extenders Act of 2010
- P.L. 111-312 Enacted 12/17/10 Tax Relief, Unemployment Insurance Reauthorization, and Job Creation Act of 2010
- P.L. 111-322 Enacted 12/22/10 Continuing Appropriations and Surface Transportation Extensions Act of 2011
- P.L. 111-325 Enacted 12/22/10 Regulated Investment Company Modernization Act of 2010
- P.L. 111-329 Enacted 12/22/10 Airport and Airway Extension Act of 2010, Part IV
- P.L. 111-344 Enacted 12/29/10 Omnibus Trade Act of 2010
- P.L. 111-347 Enacted 01/02/11 James Zadroga 9/11 Health and Compensation Act of 2010
- P.L. 111-350 Enacted 01/04/11
- P.L. 111-366 Enacted 01/04/11
- P.L. 112-5 Enacted 03/04/11 Surface Transportation and Extension Act of 2011
- P.L. 112-7 Enacted 03/31/11 Airport and Airway Extension Act of 2011
- P.L. 112-9 Enacted 04/14/11 Comprehensive 1099 Taxpayer Protection and Repayment of Exchange Subsidy Overpayments Act of 2011
- P.L. 112-10 Enacted 04/15/11 Department of Defense and Full-Year Continuing Appropriations Act, 2011
- P.L. 112-16 Enacted 05/31/11 Airport and Airway Extension Act of 2011, Part II
- P.L. 112-21 Enacted 06/29/11 Airport and Airway Extension Act of 2011, Part III
- P.L. 112-27 Enacted 08/05/11 Airport and Airway Extension Act of 2011, Part IV
- P.L. 112-30 Enacted 09/16/11 Surface and Air Transportation Programs Extension Act of 2011
- P.L. 112-40 Enacted 10/21/11 Trade Adjustment Assistance Extension Act of 2011
- P.L. 112-41 Enacted 10/21/11 United States-Korea Free Trade Agreement Implementation Act
- P.L. 112-56 Enacted 11/21/11 VOW to Hire Heroes Act of 2011
- P.L. 112-91 Enacted 01/31/12 Airport and Airway Extension Act of 2012
- P.L. 112-95 Enacted 02/14/12 FAA Modernization and Reform Act of 2012
- P.L. 112-96 Enacted 02/22/12 Middle Class Tax Relief and Job Creation Act of 2012
- P.L. 112-102 Enacted 03/30/12 Surface Transportation Extension Act of 2012
- P.L. 112-140 Enacted 06/29/12 Temporary Surface Transportation Extension Act of 2012
- P.L. 112-141 Enacted 07/06/12 Highway Investment, Job Creation, and Economic Growth Act of 2012; Moving Ahead for Progress in the 21st Century Act (MAP-21)
- P.L. 112-239 Enacted 01/02/13 National Defense Authorization Act for Fiscal Year 2013
- P.L. 112-240 Enacted 01/02/13 American Taxpayer Relief Act of 2012
- P.L. 113-15 Enacted 06/25/13
- P.L. 113-22 Enacted 07/25/13
- P.L. 113-94 Enacted 04/03/14 Gabriella Miller Kids First Research Act
- P.L. 113-97 Enacted 04/07/14 Cooperative and Small Employer Charity Pension Flexibility Act
- P.L. 113-121 Enacted 06/10/14 Water Resources Reform and Development Act of 2014
- P.L. 113-128 Enacted 07/22/14 Workforce Innovation and Opportunity Act
- P.L. 113-159 Enacted 08/08/14 Highway and Transportation Funding Act of 2014
- P.L. 113-168 Enacted 09/26/14 Tribal General Welfare Exclusion Act of 2014
- P.L. 113-188 Enacted 11/26/14 Government Reports Elimination Act of 2014
- P.L. 113-235 Enacted 12/16/14 Consolidated and Further Continuing Appropriations Act, 2015
- P.L. 113-287 Enacted 12/19/14
- P.L. 113-295 Enacted 12/19/14 Tax Increase Prevention Act of 2014; Tax Technical Corrections Act of 2014; Stephen Beck, Jr., Achieving a Better Life Experience Act of 2014
- P.L. 114-10 Enacted 04/16/15 Medicare Access and CHIP Reauthorization Act of 2015
- P.L. 114-14 Enacted 05/22/15 Don't Tax Our Fallen Public Safety Heroes Act
- P.L. 114-21 Enacted 05/29/15 Highway and Transportation Funding Act of 2015
- P.L. 114-26 Enacted 06/29/15 Defending Public Safety Employees' Retirement Act
- P.L. 114-27 Enacted 06/29/15 Trade Preferences Extension Act of 2015; Trade Adjustment Assistance Reauthorization Act of 2015
- P.L. 114-41 Enacted 07/31/15 Surface Transportation and Veterans Health Care Choice Improvement Act of 2015
- P.L. 114-55 Enacted 09/30/15 Airport and Airway Extension Act of 2015
- P.L. 114-73 Enacted 10/29/15 Surface Transportation Extension Act of 2015
- P.L. 114-74 Enacted 11/2/15 Bipartisan Budget Act of 2015
- P.L. 114-87 Enacted 11/20/15 Surface Transportation Extension Act of 2015, Part II
- P.L. 114-92 Enacted 11/25/15 National Defense Authorization Act for Fiscal Year 2016
- P.L. 114-94 Enacted 12/04/15 Fixing America's Surface Transportation Act
- P.L. 114-95 Enacted 12/10/15 Every Student Succeeds Act
- P.L. 114-113 Enacted 12/18/15 Consolidated Appropriations Act, 2016
- P.L. 114-125 Enacted 02/24/16 Trade Facilitation and Trade Enforcement Act of 2015
- P.L. 114-141 Enacted 03/30/16 Airport and Airway Extension Act of 2016
- P.L. 114-184 Enacted 06/30/16 Recovering Missing Children Act
- P.L. 114-190 Enacted 07/15/16 FAA Extension, Safety, and Security Act of 2016
- P.L. 114-239 Enacted 10/07/16 United States Appreciation for Olympians and Paralympians Act of 2016
- P.L. 114-255 Enacted 12/13/16 21st Century Cures Act
- P.L. 114-328 Enacted 12/23/16 National Defense Authorization Act for Fiscal Year 2017
- P.L. 115-63 Enacted 09/29/17 Disaster Tax Relief and Airport and Airway Extension Act of 2017
- P.L. 115-97 Enacted 12/22/17 Tax Cuts and Jobs Act of 2017
- P.L. 115-120 Enacted 01/22/18
- P.L. 115-123 Enacted 02/09/18 Bipartisan Budget Act of 2018
- P.L. 115-141 Enacted 03/23/2018 Consolidated Appropriations Act, 2018
- P.L. 115-232 Enacted 08/13/2018 John S. McCain National Defense Authorization Act for Fiscal Year 2019
- P.L. 115-243 Enacted 09/20/2018 Tribal Social Security Fairness Act of 2018
- P.L. 115-250 Enacted 09/29/2018 Airport and Airway Extension Act of 2018, Part II
- P.L. 115-254 Enacted 10/05/2018 FAA Reauthorization Act of 2018
- P.L. 115-271 Enacted 10/24/2018 Substance Use-Disorder Prevention that Promotes Opioid Recovery and Treatment (SUPPORT) for Patients and Communities Act of 2019
- P.L. 116-25 Enacted 07/01/2019 Taxpayer First Act
- P.L. 116-59 Enacted 10/01/2019 Continuing Appropriations Act, 2020, and Health Extenders Act of 2019
- P.L. 116-69 Enacted 11/21/2019 Further Continuing Appropriations Act, 2020, and Further Health Extenders Act of 2019
- P.L. 116-91 Enacted 12/19/2019 Fostering Undergraduate Talent by Unlocking Resources for Education Act
- P.L. 116-92 Enacted 12/20/2019 National Defense Authorization Act for Fiscal Year 2020
- P.L. 116-94 Enacted 12/20/2019 Further Consolidated Appropriations Act, 2020

== 2020s ==
- P.L. 116-127 Enacted 03/18/20 Families First Coronavirus Response Act
- P.L. 116-136 Enacted 03/27/20 Coronavirus Aid, Relief, and Economic Security Act
- P.L. 116-142 Enacted 06/05/20 Paycheck Protection Program Flexibility Act of 2020
- P.L. 116-159 Enacted 10/01/20 Continuing Appropriations Act, 2021 and Other Extensions Act
- P.L. 116-260 Enacted 12/27/20 Consolidated Appropriations Act, 2021
- P.L. 116-283 Enacted 01/01/21 William M. (Mac) Thornberry National Defense Authorization Act for Fiscal Year 2021
- P.L. 117-2 Enacted 03/11/21 American Rescue Plan Act of 2021
- P.L. 117-58 Enacted 11/15/21 Infrastructure Investment and Jobs Act (IIJA)
- P.L. 117–103 Enacted 03/15/22 Consolidated Appropriations Act, 2022
- P.L. 117-167 Enacted 08/09/22 CHIPS Act of 2022
- P.L. 117-169 Enacted 08/16/22 Inflation Reduction Act of 2022
- P.L. 117-286 Enacted 12/27/22
- P.L. 117-328 Enacted 12/29/22 Consolidated Appropriations Act, 2023
- P.L. 118-63 Enacted 05/16/24 FAA Reauthorization Act of 2024
- P.L. 118-146 Enacted 12/12/24 VETT Act
- P.L. 118-148 Enacted 12/12/24 Federal Disaster Tax Relief Act of 2023
- H.J.Res.25 Enacted 04/10/25
- P.L. 119-21 Enacted 07/04/25 One Big Beautiful Bill Act
- P.L. 119-29 Enacted 07/24/25 Filing Relief for Natural Disasters Act
- _______ Enacted 12/01/25 Internal Revenue Service Math and Taxpayer Help Act

== Sources ==
- Internal Revenue Code: Income, Estate, Gift, Employment, and Excise Taxes (Winter). CCH Tax Law Editors.
