= Revenue Act =

The Revenue Act can refer to a number of tax-related laws:

== British Empire ==
- Revenue Act 1764 (4 Geo. 3. c. 15), popularly known as the Sugar Act
- Revenue Act 1766 (6 Geo. 3. c. 52)
- Revenue Act 1767 (7 Geo. 3. c. 46), one of the Townshend Acts

== United States ==
- Revenue Act of 1861
- Revenue Act of 1862
- Revenue Act of 1894, known as the Wilson–Gorman Tariff Act
- War Revenue Act of 1898
- Revenue Act of 1913
- Revenue Act of 1916
- War Revenue Act of 1917
- Revenue Act of 1918
- Revenue Act of 1921
- Revenue Act of 1924
- Revenue Act of 1926
- Revenue Act of 1928
- Revenue Act of 1932
- Revenue Act of 1934
- Revenue Act of 1935
- Revenue Act of 1936
- Revenue Act of 1940
- Revenue Act of 1941
- Revenue Act of 1942
- Revenue Act of 1943
- Revenue Act of 1945
- Revenue Act of 1948
- Revenue Act of 1950
- Revenue Act of 1951
- Revenue Act of 1962
- Revenue Act of 1964
- Tax Reform Act of 1969
- Revenue Act of 1978
