= Tax Reform Act =

In the United States of America, the Tax Reform Act may refer to three acts with that name:

- Tax Reform Act of 1969
- Tax Reform Act of 1976
- Tax Reform Act of 1986

It may also refer to any of a wider set of Amendments to the Internal Revenue Laws of the United States
