= Revenue and Expenditure Control Act of 1968 =

American law imposing income tax surcharge

- Long title: An Act to increase revenues, to limit expenditures and new obligational authority, and for other purposes.
- Enacted by: the 90th United States Congress
- Effective: June 28, 1968

Citations
- Public law: 90-364
- Statutes at Large: 82 Stat. 251

Codification
- Titles amended: 26 U.S.C.: Internal Revenue Code
- U.S.C. sections amended: I.R.C. ch. 1 §§ 101-110, 201-205, 301-303

Legislative history
- Introduced in the House as H.R. 15414; Passed the Senate on April 2, 1968 (57-31); Passed the House on June 20, 1968 (257-162); Reported by the joint conference committee on June 20, 1968; agreed to by the House on June 20, 1968 (268-150) and by the Senate on June 21, 1968 (64-16); Signed into law by President Lyndon Johnson on June 28, 1968

The Revenue and Expenditure Control Act of 1968 is a United States law that created a temporary 10 percent income tax surcharge for both individuals and corporations through June 30, 1969, to help pay for the Vietnam War. It also delayed a scheduled reduction in the telephone and automobile excise tax, causing them to end in 1973 instead of 1969. President Lyndon Johnson signed the legislation into law on June 28, 1968.

Though the act imposed a 10 percent surcharge overall, Johnson noted its limited effects on some, saying just before signing the bill, "A family of four earning less than $5,000 ($45,211 in 2024 dollars) would pay nothing additional. A family making $10,000 ($90,421 in 2024 dollars) would pay just $2 ($18 in 2024 dollars) extra per week". The law took into effect for corporations on January 1, 1968, and for individuals on April 1, 1968, with the surcharge ending on July 1, 1969.

As a result of the tax, the federal government had a budget surplus in 1969, which was its last surplus until 1998. The tax produced the third largest one-year revenue increase, adjusted for inflation, and the largest increase as a percent of GDP since 1968. US GDP growth gradually slowed from 8.4% in Q1 of 1968 to -1.9% in Q4 1969. Annually, GDP growth slowed from 4.8% in 1968 to 0.2% in 1970.

The automobile excise tax was repealed in 1971 in the Revenue Act of 1971 and the Federal telephone excise tax was continued until 2006. The act has no direct continuing effect on United States Tax Law as all of its provisions have expired or been repealed.

== Legislative history ==
Final House of Representatives vote, June 20, 1968

Vote by Party	Yea		Nay		Not Voting
Republicans	114	61%	73	39%	0
Democrats	153	66%	77	34%	14
Total	267	64%	150	36%	14

Final Senate vote, June 21, 1968

Vote by Party	Yea		Nay		Not Voting
Republicans	31	94%	2	6%	3
Democrats	33	70%	14	30%	16
Total	64	80%	16	20%	19
