= Revenue (disambiguation) =

Revenue is income that a company receives from normal business activities. It may also refer to:

- Revenue Commissioners, a tax agency in Ireland
- HM Revenue and Customs, a tax agency in the United Kingdom
- Revenue Act, several tax-related laws of the same name
- Revenue (album), jazz album by Steve Lacy
- Revenue, Saskatchewan, locality in Canada
