= Excise Tax Reduction Act of 1954 =

The United States Excise Tax Reduction Act of 1954 temporarily extended the 1951 excise tax increases (through March 31, 1955), but also reduced excise tax rates on, among other things, telephones, admissions, and jewelry.
