= Cancellation-of-debt income =

Taxpayers in the United States may have tax consequences when debt is cancelled. This is commonly known as cancellation-of-debt (COD) income. According to the Internal Revenue Code, the discharge of indebtedness must be included in a taxpayer's gross income. There are exceptions to this rule, however, so a careful examination of one's COD income is important to determine any potential tax consequences.

Billions of dollars of cancelled debts will generate many unexpected tax bills, due to debt cancellations that financial institutions have started accelerating in 2012.

== Policy reasons behind COD income ==
=== Accession to wealth ===
The standard definition of income is found in a United States Supreme Court case entitled Commissioner v. Glenshaw Glass Co. The Court defined income as 1) accession to wealth; 2) that is clearly realized; and 3) over which the taxpayer has complete dominion.

Prior to this decision, the Court had already determined that the cancellation of debt was "a freeing of assets." Essentially, when debt is cancelled, money that would have been used to pay that debt is now free to be used on anything else the taxpayer wants. This is also known as "accession to wealth." Therefore, under Glenshaw Glass, it seems only natural to include COD income in gross income.

=== Symmetry ===
A loan by itself is neither gross income to the borrower, nor a tax deduction to the lender. This is because there is "symmetry" of assets and liabilities on both side: the borrower's increased wealth when the loan is taken out is offset by an obligation to repay that same amount. Likewise, the lender's loss of wealth by lending out that money is offset by the borrower's promise to pay back the entire amount. Ignoring interest, both sides will be in exactly the same position when the loan is repaid as they were in before the loan was even made.

When debt is cancelled, then that symmetry is destroyed. The borrower is now in a better position than if the loan was fully repaid. The taxpayer now has a greater ability to pay taxes and this is shown by including the amount of canceled debt in gross income.

== IRS Form 1099-C and reporting requirements ==
=== Who must file IRS Form 1099-C ===
Generally, any creditor canceling debt of $600.00 or more is required to file Form 1099-C by January 31 of the next year following the date when the debt was canceled.

The creditor may be a lending institution, the subsequent holder of a note, a trustee for multiple owners of a single note or a governmental unit, but also includes individuals and business organizations of all kinds.

Failure to file Form 1099-C may subject the taxpayer to civil penalties, but such penalties are relatively minor, and rarely exceed $150.00 per form. There is no exemption from the filing requirement if canceled debt in excess of $600.00 is recognized.

One exception to the requirement to file 1099-C is when a student loan has been discharged due to the death or permanent disability of the borrower under provisions of the Tax Cuts and Jobs Act of 2017. The IRS has issued a notice that lenders or servicers of loans discharged under these provisions are not required to issue Form 1099-C, and should not do so even voluntarily.

=== When one must file IRS Form 1099-C ===
Generally, IRS Form 1099-C is to be filed along with reporting Form 1096 by the end of January of the year following the date when the debt was canceled. However, if that date falls on a weekend, the filing date is postponed to the next business day.

== Special circumstances ==
=== Rail Joint doctrine ===
Whether or not there is cancellation-of-indebtedness income can sometimes be ambiguous and controversial. In Commissioner v. Rail Joint Co., a corporation issued its own bonds as a dividend to its shareholders. When the bonds declined in value, Rail Joint repurchased them for less than their face amount. Ordinarily, retiring bonds for less than the issue price would result in taxable canceled debt. However, in holding that there was no COD for Rail Joint, the court noted that, unlike in a normal issuance of corporate debt for cash consideration, the original issuance of these bonds as dividends did not increase the capital of the corporation and did not create burdened assets to be later freed by the cancellation.

The IRS has formally non-acquiesced to the Rail Joint doctrine, arguing that what really happens in these situations is a constructive dividend and purchase: The corporation constructively issues a cash dividend to shareholders, who then contribute that cash back to the corporation in exchange for the bonds; the burdened asset is thus the constructively re-contributed cash. Rail Joint is nonetheless good law, and has been expanded to encompass other situations where the taxpayer received nothing of value in exchange for the debt, such as when a guarantor of a loan who did not enjoy the benefit of the loan settles it for less than the face amount.

=== Nonrecourse debt ===
Whether secured debt is recourse or nonrecourse can have significant consequences if the debt is settled in foreclosure of the secured property. Generally, while the net gain or loss is the same regardless of the classification of the debt (it will always be the difference between the basis of the burdened property and the amount of the debt), there are potentially huge tax differences.

When property burdened by nonrecourse debt is foreclosed upon, there is no cancellation of indebtedness even if the amount of the loan exceeds the fair market value of the property. The case of Commissioner v. Tufts holds that in such a situation, the amount realized is the amount of the debt, and the fair market value of the property is irrelevant. That this difference between the adjusted basis of the property and the amount of the debt is simple gain rather than COD has potential upsides and downsides. On the one hand, the gain would be capital gain assuming the property foreclosed upon were a capital asset, unlike COD which is ordinary. On the other hand, COD is potentially excludable, as by insolvency (see below).

If the same property had been burdened by recourse debt, and, as above, that property were foreclosed upon in full satisfaction of the debt, you would get a different result. The gain or loss would be determined with reference to the fair market value of the property, and the difference between the fair market value and the debt would be COD. (This intuitively makes sense because with recourse debt, any cancellation of the outstanding balance of the debt, after it has been satisfied to the extent of the FMV of the property given up, really is a termination of personal liability to pay that amount, unlike in a situation where the debt is nonrecourse). If the property has a value lower than its basis, then in the case of recourse debt you could get a capital loss and COD ordinary income on the same transaction, netting to the same dollar figure as with nonrecourse debt but potentially much worse for the taxpayer: The taxpayer would not only be burdened with ordinary rather than potentially capital gains, but may have more total income to report, offset only by a capital loss that would be unusable (except to a nominal extent in the case of individuals) if the taxpayer had no other capital transactions for the year. Only in the case of a taxpayer able to utilize one of the COD exclusions, such as insolvency, could this result be better.

=== Disputed Debt Doctrine ===
The Disputed Debt Doctrine (also known as the Contested Liability Doctrine), is yet another exception to including COD income in gross income. This doctrine can be found in a Third Circuit Court of Appeals case, Zarin v. Commissioner. In order for this exception to apply, the amount of debt must actually be disputed. This can happen if the two parties actually have a good faith dispute over the amount owed. A written instrument containing the amount of debt will probably not satisfy this requirement. However, as the court decided in Zarin, the Disputed Debt Doctrine can also apply if the debt is not legally enforceable.

== Exclusions ==
Not all COD income must be included in gross income. There are several exceptions:

- If the discharge of indebtedness occurs in a Title 11 case—i.e., a bankruptcy
- If the discharge of indebtedness occurs when the taxpayer is insolvent
- If the indebtedness discharged is qualified farm indebtedness
- If the indebtedness discharged is qualified real property business indebtedness
- If the indebtedness discharged is a student loan that has been discharged due to the death or total permanent disability of the borrower. This particular provision was added in the Tax Cuts and Jobs Act of 2017, and applies to discharges during calendar years 2018 through 2025.

In addition, the Code recognizes a Purchase Price Adjustment exception.

- Student loans forgiven for working for certain classes of employers are also excluded

=== Requirements ===
In order to qualify under these exclusions, the taxpayer's indebtedness must result from either

- indebtedness for which the taxpayer is liable; or
- indebtedness subject to which the taxpayer holds property

For example, if the lender cannot legally enforce the debt, then the taxpayer is not liable for that debt and will therefore not have tax consequences.

If one of the two requirements are met, then the taxpayer must show that they fall under one of the five exclusions in order to avoid tax consequences on the COD Income.

=== Policy reasons behind COD income exclusions ===
The exclusions under Section 108 are justified under various rationales. First, it is difficult to collect tax from insolvent taxpayers. The bankruptcy and the insolvency provisions defer the tax to a time when taxpayer is able to pay. The farm indebtedness provision, on the other hand, represents a political decision to subsidize farmers by offering a tax benefit. The student loan exclusion for those who do certain types of work is designed to maximize that benefit. Prior to the enactment of the Tax Cuts and Jobs Act of 2017, there were several lobbying efforts to amend 108(f)(1) for those who get total and permanent disability discharges, since under Department of Education rules, such borrowers are subject to a three-year post-discharge review period during which their incomes from employment cannot exceed the poverty line.

=== Title 11 case ===
A Title 11 case is one that falls under Title 11 of the United States Code (relating to bankruptcy).

=== Insolvency ===
A taxpayer is insolvent when their total liabilities exceed the fair market value of assets. For example, if a taxpayer has $100,000 in liabilities, but only $50,000 in assets, they are considered insolvent under the Internal Revenue Code. Therefore, a cancellation of a $20,000 debt will not need to be reported as gross income. However, if a debt of $60,000 was cancelled, the taxpayer will have $10,000 in gross income because their total liabilities no longer exceed their total assets (cancelling $60,000 in debt means the taxpayer now has only $40,000 in liabilities).

The criteria for the insolvency exclusion are considerably more strict than those used under bankruptcy law. The asset base for the insolvency exemption includes tax-advantaged retirement accounts, almost all types of which are excluded by law from the asset base in bankruptcy. The asset base for the insolvency exclusion also includes assets that serve as collateral for any debt carried by the taxpayer.

=== Qualified farm indebtedness ===
A taxpayer has qualified farm indebtedness if

- such indebtedness was incurred directly in connection with the taxpayer's trade or business in farming; and
- 50% or more of the aggregate gross receipts of the taxpayer for the three taxable years preceding the discharge is attributable to the trade or business of farming

However, such a taxpayer must be a "qualified person" as defined in 26 U.S.C. § 49(a)(1)(D)(iv)

There are additional rules as well regarding the total amount excludable, which cannot exceed the sum of tax attributes and business and investment assets.

=== Qualified real business property indebtedness ===
A qualified real property business indebtedness is indebtedness which

- was incurred or assumed by the taxpayer in connection with real property used in a trade or business and is secured by such real property;
- was either 1) incurred or assumed prior to January 1, 1993, or 2) incurred or assumed to acquire, construct, reconstruct, or substantially improve the real property; and
- the taxpayer elects to apply this exception

However, this exclusion will only reduce the basis of the depreciable real property of the taxpayer.

=== Purchase price adjustment ===
Sometimes a price agreement will be reached between buyer and seller, but for some reason both agree to reduce that price at a later date. A strict reading of the Internal Revenue Code says that the amount reduced is COD income, it does not fall under one of the four exclusions, and is thus gross income. To remedy this situation, Congress passed 26 U.S.C. § 108(e)(5), also known as the purchase price adjustment. If a reduction in price occurs after the parties have already reached an agreement, the Code treats the new agreed-upon price as if it were the original price, which means there will not be COD income to the buyer.

=== Reduction in tax attributes ===
==== General ====
If COD income is excluded from gross income, the taxpayer's tax attributes must be reduced, which is done through IRS Form 982 (Reduction of Tax Attributes Due to Discharge of Indebtedness). A taxpayer's tax attributes are, and must be reduced in the following order:

- Net operating loss (NOL) – Any NOL of the taxable year of the discharge
- NOL carryover – Any NOL carryover to the taxable year of the discharge
- General business credit – Any carryover to or from the taxable year of a discharge of an amount for purposes for determining the amount allowable as a credit under 26 U.S.C. §38 (relating to general business credit)
- Minimum tax credit – The amount of the minimum tax credit available under 26 U.S.C. §53(b) as of the beginning of the tax year immediately following the taxable year of the discharge
- Net capital loss – Any net capital loss of the taxable year of the discharge
- Capital loss carryover – Any capital loss carryover to the taxable year of the discharge
- Basis reduction – The basis of the property of the taxpayer
- Passive activity loss and credit carryovers – Any passive activity loss or credit carryover under 26 U.S.C. §469(b) from the taxable year of the discharge
- Foreign tax credit carryovers – Any carryover to or from the taxable year of the discharge for purposes of determining the amount of the credit allowable under 26 U.S.C. §27

The reduction in tax attributes is made after the determination of the tax imposed for the taxable year of the discharge.

When reducing NOL or capital loss carryovers, the reduction in tax attributes must be in the order of the taxable years that each carryover was created in.

When reducing general business credit or foreign tax credit carryovers, the reduction in tax attributes must be made in order that the carryovers are taken into account.

==== Policy reasons behind reducing tax attributes ====
In the case of excluding COD income from gross income, that policy prevents creating a new tax burden on insolvent and bankrupt taxpayers, who are likely in a situation where they financially need that benefit, and who would likely be difficult or impossible to collect from.

However, in the case of reducing the taxpayer's tax attributes, this policy does not create a new tax burden on the taxpayer. It instead reduces tax credits and carryforwards that would be used to offset future earned income.

If a taxpayer's tax attributes were not reduced, taxpayers could intentionally create large tax attributes by creating debt, cancelling the debt, and unjustly reducing their future taxes without paying on the debt. For example, a taxpayer could intentionally run up large amounts of business debt and losses, creating a large NOL. Then, after filing a bankruptcy to wipe out the debt, they could use the NOL carryforward for up to twenty years or until it was exhausted.

==== Amount of reduction of tax attributes ====
The reductions in tax attributes are dollar-for-dollar to the amount of excluded COD income for the: NOL, capital loss carryover, and basis reduction. The reductions in tax attributes are 33 1/3 cents-for-dollar of amount of excluded COD income for the: general business credit, maximum tax credit, passive activity loss and credit carryovers, and foreign tax credit carryovers.

==== NOL special treatment for S corporation ====
S corporations do not have net operating losses (NOL). Instead, the concept of NOL is handled at the shareholder level. Each shareholder must treat any loss or deduction that exceeds their stock and debt basis as a suspended (disallowed) loss, which carries forward indefinitely until applied toward future earned income pass through by the S corporation.

So that the shareholders of an S corporation do not receive a tax benefit when individuals or other forms of business would not, when reducing tax attributes current year NOL is substituted by the shareholders' current year disallowed loss, and the NOL carryovers are substituted by the shareholders' disallowed loss carryovers. The tests for exclusion of cancellation-of-debt income still happen at the S corporation level.

Furthermore, on March 9, 2002, President Bush signed the Job Creation and Worker Assistance Act of 2002. This act prohibited shareholders from increasing basis for their portions of the S corporation's excluded cancellation-of-debt income, for discharges of indebtedness after October 11, 2001. This effectively overturned the January 9, 2001, U.S. Supreme Court decision to allow such increases in basis in Gilitz v. Commissioner, 531 U.S. 206 (2001).

==== Election to reduce basis first ====
A taxpayer may elect to apply the tax attribute reduction first against the basis of depreciable property of the taxpayer, not to exceed the aggregate adjusted bases of the depreciable property held by the taxpayer as of the beginning of the taxable year following the taxable year of the discharge.

==== In case of separate bankruptcy estate ====
If a separate bankruptcy estate was created, the trustee must reduce the bankruptcy estate's tax attributes by the cancelled debt. The taxpayer then "inherits" the ending tax attributes of the bankruptcy estate.
