= Mortgage Forgiveness Debt Relief Act of 2007 =

The Mortgage Forgiveness Debt Relief Act of 2007 was introduced in the United States Congress on September 25, 2007, and signed into law by President George W. Bush on December 20, 2007. This act offers relief to homeowners who would have owed taxes on forgiven mortgage debt after facing foreclosure. The act extends such relief for three years, applying to debts discharged in calendar years 2007 through 2009. With the Emergency Economic Stabilization Act of 2008, this tax relief was extended another three years, covering debts discharged through calendar year 2012. The relief was further extended until January 1, 2014, at Section 202 of the American Taxpayer Relief Act of 2012.

This tax relief has been renewed each year since. The Bipartisan Budget Act of 2018 renewed it for all of the tax year 2017 and offered a wide range of individual and business tax benefits that had expired at the end of 2016, including the "exclusion from gross income of discharge of qualified principal residence indebtedness (often, foreclosure-related debt forgiveness), claimed on Form 982."

In the eyes of the Internal Revenue Service (IRS), housing debt that is forgiven or written off is the same as income. If the law expires, forgiven mortgage debt will be taxable. The same applies to foreclosures and to loan modifications in which principal is reduced.

Once the lender writes off the debt, it will report the amount to the IRS. Homeowners should expect to receive Form 1099-C, Cancellation of Debt showing the cancelled debt amount.

All taxpayers, including those who qualify for the exemption, will get the form in the mail if they had debt cancelled. Those who qualify for the exclusion will be required to file Form 982 with their taxes for that year. The exemption applies only to debt related to a primary residence. Mortgages on vacation and rental properties are not exempt under the act. Homeowners who did cash out refinancing and used the money for any other purpose than fixing up their house could still be required to report the forgiven debt as income.

However, after the signing of the Mortgage Forgiveness Act of 2007, amendments have been made to remove such tax liability and allow the borrower and lender to work freely together to find a common solution that is beneficial to both parties. This protection is limited to primary residences—rental properties are ineligible for relief—so consultation with a tax advisor is necessary to ensure that a borrower qualifies. The amount of excluded forgiven mortgage debt is limited to $2 million per year.

== Cancellation-of-debt income ==
If money is borrowed and the lender later cancels or forgives the outstanding loan balance, the cancelled amount may need to be reported as income by the borrower. At the time of borrowing, the loan proceeds did not have to be reported as income because there was an obligation to repay the lender. Forgiving that obligation makes those loan proceeds income. The lender is usually required to report the amount of the cancelled debt to the borrower and the IRS on a Form 1099-C, Cancellation of Debt.

Cancelled mortgage debts are not always taxed by the IRS. There are some occasions when the borrower is exempted from paying any tax on the forgiven mortgage loan amount. Some of the exceptions are as follows:

- Qualified principal residence indebtedness – This exception has been offered under the Mortgage Debt Relief Act of 2007 and it is valid on most of the mortgage borrowers.
- Insolvency – An insolvent borrower whose mortgage debt has been forgiven may not be obligated to pay taxes on all or part of the cancelled debt. Insolvency will only be considered when the borrower's total debt exceeds the market value of the assets.
- Bankruptcy – All debts discharged under a certain bankruptcy are regarded as non-taxable income.
- Non-recourse loans – In case of non-recourse loans, lenders repossess the property signed as collateral by the borrower as a remedy to resolve the loan repayment default. However, lenders are barred from pursuing their borrowers for the repayment of the loan money in the event of a default. Once a property has been foreclosed, the forgiven non-recourse loan will not be considered as cancelled debt. But, that may attract other taxes.
- Some farm debts – If a borrower's source of income for the past three years was through farming, and the borrower has incurred debt due to its direct operation, and the lender is an agency or a person who is a regular lender, then the cancelled debt will not attract any taxes.
