= Victory Tax =

Temporary American income tax

The Victory Tax was a 5% income tax established in the United States by the Revenue Act of 1942. Congress attempted to reduce the tax to 3% in the Revenue Act of 1943; that bill was vetoed by President Roosevelt, but his veto was overridden. The tax was eliminated in the Individual Income Tax Act of 1944.
