= Worker, Homeownership, and Business Assistance Act of 2009 =

The Unemployment Compensation Extension Act of 2009 (H.R. 3548) is a bill introduced in the U.S. House of Representatives of the 111th United States Congress by Congressman Jim McDermott that would give an extra 13 weeks of unemployment benefits to jobless workers in states with unemployment rates of 8.5 percent or more.

On September 22, 2009, the House approved the bill by a 331–83 margin. The Senate passed the measure 98–0 on November 4, 2009, with an amendment designating the bill the Worker, Homeownership, and Business Assistance Act of 2009. The bill, as passed by the Senate, would give an extra 20 weeks of unemployment benefits to workers in states with unemployment rates over 8.5 percent, but would also give an extra 14 weeks to the 24 states with lower unemployment, in addition to extending the homebuyer's tax credit. On November 5, the House agreed to the Senate's amendment by a vote of 403–12, sending the bill to President Barack Obama's desk. President Obama signed the bill on November 6.

== New tax provisions for home buyers in the Act ==
Besides extending the $8,000 tax credit for first time home buyers until April 2010, the Act also provides a $6,500 tax credit for current homeowners who purchase a home between November 6, 2009, and end of April 2010. The Act also increases the income limits to qualify for the credit. The income limits based on modified adjusted gross income were increased from $75,000 to $125,000 for single filers and from $125,000 to $225,000 for joint filers.
