= Deficit Reduction Act of 1984 =

United States federal law

- Long title: An Act to provide for tax reform, and for deficit reduction.
- Acronyms (colloquial): DEFRA
- Enacted by: the 98th United States Congress
- Effective: January 1, 1985

Citations
- Public law: Pub. L. 98–369
- Statutes at Large: 98 Stat. 494

Codification
- Titles amended: 26 U.S.C.: Internal Revenue Code

Legislative history
- Introduced in the House as H.R. 4170 by Dan Rostenkowski (D-IL) on October 20, 1983; Committee consideration by House Ways and Means; Passed the House on April 11, 1984 (318-97); Passed the Senate on May 17, 1984 (74-23, in lieu of H.R. 2163); Reported by the joint conference committee on Jun 23, 1984; agreed to by the House on June 27, 1984 (268-155) and by the Senate on June 27, 1984 (83-15); Signed into law by President Ronald Reagan on July 18, 1984

Deficit Reduction Act of 1984 (Pub. L. 98–369), also known as the DEFRA, was a federal law enacted in the United States in 1984. Originally part of the stalled Tax Reform Act of 1983, it was adjusted and reintroduced as the Tax Reform Act of 1984. After passing in the House, it was merged with the Senate version into its final form. Collectively known as the Deficit Reduction Act of 1984, it was signed into law by president Ronald Reagan on July 18, 1984.

== Summary of provisions ==
The Office of Tax Analysis of the United States Department of the Treasury summarized the tax changes as follows:

- repealed scheduled 15% net interest exclusion ($900 cap)
- reduced benefits from income averaging
- reduced tax benefits for property leased by tax exempt entities
- temporarily extended federal telephone excise tax (through 1987)
- increased depreciation lives for real property from 15 years to 18 years
