= Revenue Act of 1940 =

United States federal income tax legislation

- Long title: An Act to provide for the expenses of national preparedness by raising revenue and issuing bonds, to provide a method for paying for such bonds, and for other purposes.
- Enacted by: the 76th United States Congress

Citations
- Public law: Pub. L. 76–656
- Statutes at Large: 54 Stat. 516

Codification
- Acts amended: Internal Revenue Code of 1939
- Titles amended: Title 26 of the United States Code

Legislative history
- Introduced in the House as H.R. 10413 by Rep. Robert L. Doughton (D–NC) on May 29, 1940; Committee consideration by House Ways and Means; Senate Finance; Passed the House on June 3, 1940; Passed the Senate on June 13, 1940; Signed into law by President Franklin D. Roosevelt on June 25, 1940

The Revenue Act of 1940 permanently increased individual income tax rates in the United States, permanently increased corporate tax rates from 19% to 33% and temporarily increased most excise tax rates to 30-50%. The personal exemption fell from $2,500 to $2,000 (married couples).

== Tax on corporations ==
=== Normal tax ===
A Normal Tax was levied on the net income of corporations as shown in the following table.

Revenue Act of 1940; Tax on Corporations 53 Stat. 863
Net Income (dollars)	Rate (percent)
0	19
25,000	33

== Tax on individuals ==
A normal tax and a surtax were levied against the net income of individuals as shown in the following table.

Revenue Act of 1940; Normal Tax and Surtax on Individuals 53 Stat. 5
Net Income (dollars)	Normal Rate (percent)	Surtax Rate (percent)	Combined Rate (percent)
0	4	0	4
4,000	4	4	8
6,000	4	6	10
8,000	4	8	12
10,000	4	10	14
12,000	4	12	16
14,000	4	15	19
16,000	4	18	22
18,000	4	21	25
20,000	4	24	28
22,000	4	27	31
26,000	4	30	34
32,000	4	33	37
38,000	4	36	40
44,000	4	40	44
50,000	4	44	48
60,000	4	47	51
70,000	4	50	54
80,000	4	53	57
90,000	4	56	60
100,000	4	58	62
150,000	4	60	64
200,000	4	62	66
250,000	4	64	68
300,000	4	66	70
400,000	4	68	72
500,000	4	70	74
750,000	4	72	76
1,000,000	4	73	77
2,000,000	4	74	78
5,000,000	4	75	79

- An exemption of $800 for single filers and $2,000 for married couples and heads of family was allowed, as was a $400 exemption for each dependent under 18.
