= Cooperative and Small Employer Charity Pension Flexibility Act =

Cooperative and Small Employer Charity Pension Flexibility Act (Pub. L. No. 113-97)
- Long title: To amend the Employee Retirement Income Security Act of 1974 and the Internal Revenue Code of 1986 to provide for cooperative and small employer charity pension plans.
- Announced in: the 113th United States Congress
- Sponsored by: Rep. Susan Brooks (R-IN) and Rep. Ron Kind (D-WI)

Citations
- Public law: Pub. L. 113–97 (text) (PDF)

Codification
- Acts affected: Employee Retirement Income Security Act of 1974, Internal Revenue Code of 1986

Legislative history
- Introduced in the House as H.R. 4275 by Rep. Susan Brooks (R-IN) and Rep. Ron Kind (D-WI) on March 18, 2014; Committee consideration by United States House Committee on Education and the Workforce, United States House Committee on Ways and Means; Passed the House on March 24, 2014 (voice vote); Passed the Senate on March 25, 2014 (unanimous consent); Signed into law by President Barack Obama on April 7, 2014

The Cooperative and Small Employer Charity Pension Flexibility Act (H.R. 4275; Pub. L. 113–97 (text) (PDF)) is a law that allows some charities, schools, and volunteer organizations to remain exempt from pension plan rules under the Employee Retirement Income Security Act of 1974 (ERISA) and the Internal Revenue Code.

The act became law during the 113th United States Congress. During the same congress, the Senate considered S. 1302, a bill with same name but different provisions.

== Provisions of the bill ==
This summary is based largely on the summary provided by the Congressional Research Service, a public domain source.

The Cooperative and Small Employer Charity Pension Flexibility Act would amend the Employee Retirement Income Security Act of 1974 (ERISA) and the Internal Revenue Code, with respect to cooperative and small employer charity pension plans (CSEC plans), to: (1) define such plans as employee benefit pension plans that are defined benefit plans maintained as of June 25, 2010, by multiple employers, all of whom are tax-exempt charitable organizations; (2) exempt CSEC plans from existing funding standards and allow such plans to establish minimum funding standards and special rules with respect to the valuation of plan assets, required contributions, and liquidity requirements; (3) allow pension plan sponsors to elect out of treatment of their plans as a CSEC plan in plan years beginning after December 31, 2013; and (4) require notices to pension plan participants to include statements that different rules apply to CSEC plans than apply to single-employer plans, that contributions to a plan may have changed due to amendments made by this Act, and that a CSEC Plan is in funding restoration status for the plan year.

The bill would require the Participant and Plan Sponsor Advocate established by ERISA to make itself available to assist CSEC plan sponsors and participants.

== Procedural history ==
The Cooperative and Small Employer Charity Pension Flexibility Act was introduced into the United States House of Representatives on March 18, 2014, by Rep. Susan Brooks (R-IN) and Rep. Ron Kind (D-WI) . The bill was referred to the United States House Committee on Education and the Workforce and the United States House Committee on Ways and Means. The House was scheduled to consider the bill under a suspension of the rules on March 24, 2014. On March 24, 2014, the House passed the bill with a voice vote. On March 25, 2014, the United States Senate passed the bill by unanimous consent and President Barack Obama signed the bill into law (Pub. L. 113–97 (text) (PDF)) on April 7, 2014.

== Debate and discussion ==
Rep. Brooks argued that the bill was needed because "some charities, schools and cooperatives are actually shutting down summer camps, cutting back on services to the community, or raising prices just to meet their pension obligations."

According to Jo Ann Emerson, the CEO of the National Rural Electric Cooperative Association, "both the House and Senate have now confirmed that cooperative and non-profit pension plans pose virtually no risk of default and deserve different treatment."

== See also ==
- List of bills in the 113th United States Congress
- Acts of the 113th United States Congress
