= Revenue Act of 1936 =

United States federal taxation law

The Revenue Act of 1936, 49 Stat. 1648 (June 22, 1936), established an "undistributed profits tax" on corporations in the United States. It was signed into law by President Franklin D. Roosevelt.

The act was applicable to incomes for 1936 and thereafter. Roosevelt sought additional permanent revenue of $620,000,000 and temporary revenue of $517,000,000. To secure the permanent revenue he suggested the substitution of a tax on undistributed earnings of corporations. Individual rates were raised only on the very rich (that is, income over $5 million a year.).

== Tax on corporations ==
=== Normal tax ===
A Normal Tax was levied on the net income of corporations as shown in the following table.

Revenue Act of 1936; Tax on Corporations 49 Stat. 1655
Net Income (dollars)	Rate (percent)
0	8
2,000	11
15,000	13
40,000	15

=== Surtax on undistributed profits ===
A Surtax was levied on corporations on "undistributed profits", i.e. profits not paid out in dividends, as shown in the following table.

Revenue Act of 1936; Surtax on Undistributed Profits 49 Stat. 1655
Application (percent of undistributed net income)	Surtax Rate (percent)
up to 10	7
from 10 to 20	12
from 20 to 40	17
from 40 to 60	22
over 60	27

== Tax on individuals ==
A normal tax and a surtax were levied against the net income of individuals as shown in the following table.

Revenue Act of 1936; Normal Tax and Surtax on Individuals 49 Stat. 1653
Net Income (dollars)	Normal Rate (percent)	Surtax Rate (percent)	Combined Rate (percent)
0	4	0	4
4,000	4	4	8
6,000	4	5	9
8,000	4	6	10
10,000	4	7	11
12,000	4	8	12
14,000	4	9	13
16,000	4	11	15
18,000	4	13	17
20,000	4	15	19
22,000	4	17	21
26,000	4	19	23
32,000	4	21	25
38,000	4	24	28
44,000	4	27	31
50,000	4	31	35
56,000	4	35	39
58,000	4	35	39
62,000	4	39	43
68,000	4	43	47
74,000	4	47	51
80,000	4	51	55
90,000	4	55	59
100,000	4	58	62
150,000	4	60	64
200,000	4	62	66
250,000	4	64	68
300,000	4	66	70
400,000	4	68	72
500,000	4	70	74
750,000	4	72	76
1,000,000	4	73	77
2,000,000	4	74	78
5,000,000	4	75	79

- Exemption of $1,000 for single filers and $2,500 for married couples and heads of family. A $400 exemption for each dependent under 18.

== See also ==
- Revenue Act of 1935, which raised taxes on high incomes
