= Interest and Dividend Tax Compliance Act of 1983 =

United States federal law

- Long title: Title-I Interest and Dividend Tax Compliance
- Enacted by: the 98th United States Congress

Citations
- Public law: 98-67
- Statutes at Large: 98 Stat. 67

Legislative history
- Signed into law by President Ronald Reagan on Aug. 5, 1983

The Interest and Dividend Tax Compliance Act of 1983 was a United States federal law that was passed as Title I of Public Law 98–67, on Aug. 5, 1983, in the United States. As described in the conference report. The law repealed certain aspects of the Tax Equity and Fiscal Responsibility Act of 1982 and added provision for withholding tax on interest and dividends as backup to be collected by stock brokers and other financial institutions.

== Summary of provisions ==
- It amended the Tax Equity and Fiscal Responsibility Act of 1982 to repeal, as of June 30, 1983, provisions which require the withholding of tax on interest and dividends.
- It provided a system of backup withholding for taxpayers who underreport interest and dividend income or who fail to provide accurate taxpayer information. Under this system, the payor of any amount of income must deduct and withhold 20 percent of such payment if the payee fails to provide a taxpayer identification number or provides an incorrect one. It requires the payor of interest and dividend income to withhold 20 percent of such amounts if such payor receives notice from the Internal Revenue Service that his payee has underreported interest and dividend income or has not properly certified that he is exempt from a withholding requirement.
- It imposed a $500 penalty upon retail brokers for each intentional failure to provide a payor of reportable payments with a taxpayer identification number or a backup withholding status report.
- It imposed a penalty for failure to provide a taxpayer identification number, or any statement or return, with respect to the reporting of interest and dividend income. It removed the $50,000 limitation on the total amount of such penalty. A taxpayer would be exempt from penalty if he can show due diligence in attempting to satisfy the requirement. It made the penalty self-assessable on the taxpayer's return as an excise tax.
- It applied the negligence penalty for underpayment of tax to payees of interest and dividend income who fail to report all such income.
- It imposed the civil penalty for providing false information with respect to withholding on a failure to provide backup withholding information, and a criminal penalty for providing false backup withholding information.

== See also ==
- Tax withholding in the United States
- IRS penalties
