= Second Revenue Act of 1940 =

The United States Second Revenue Act of 1940 created a corporate excess profits tax (top rate 50%) and increased corporate tax rates (top rate from 33% to 35%).

== Tax on corporations ==
=== Normal tax ===
A Normal Tax was levied on the net income of corporations as shown in the following table.

Second Revenue Act of 1940; Normal Tax on Corporations 53 Stat. 974
Net Income (dollars)	Rate (percent)
0	22.1
25,000	35

=== Excess Profits Tax ===
A Excess Profits Tax was levied on the excess profits net income (i.e., net income less allowances and exemptions) of corporations as shown in the following table.

Second Revenue Act of 1940; Excess Profits Tax on Corporations 53 Stat. 975
Adjusted; Excess Profits; Net Income (dollars)	Rate (percent)
0	25
25,000	33
50,000	35
100,000	40
250,000	45
500,000	50

- An exemption of $5,000 is allowed, and also an "excess profits credit" and "unused excess profits credit."
