= Railroad Retirement Solvency Act of 1983 =

The Railroad Retirement Revenue Act of 1983, also known as the Railroad Retirement Solvency Act of 1983 (Public Law 98-76), was passed on August 12, 1983. Among other things, it raised tax rates for the railroad retirement taxes. Without the enactment of this legislation, the Railroad Retirement Board would have been required to substantially reduce benefit payments in 1983.

== Sources ==
- Entitlements for Railroad Employees Legislative History
