= Crude Oil Windfall Profit Tax Act of 1980 =

Repealed US federal law; excise tax

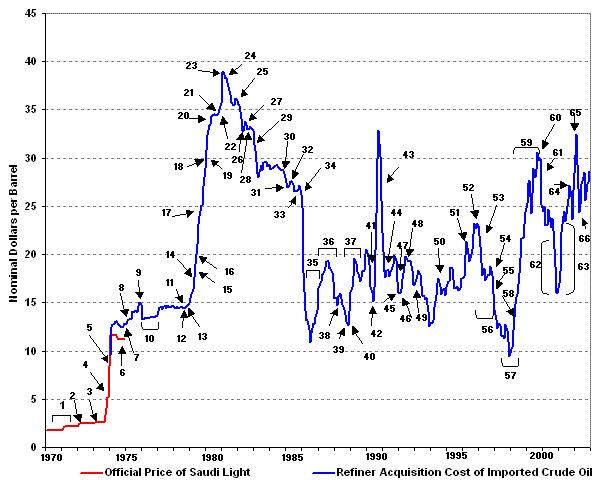
Detailed analysis of oil prices, 1970–2004

U.S. oil production and imports

The Crude Oil Windfall Profit Tax Act of 1980 (P.L. 96-223) was enacted as part of a compromise between the Carter Administration and the United States Congress over the decontrol of crude oil prices. The Act was intended to recoup the revenue earned by oil producers as a result of the sharp increase in oil prices brought about by the OPEC oil embargo. According to a report by the Congressional Research Service, the Act's title was a misnomer. "Despite its name, the crude oil windfall profit tax... was not a tax on profits. It was an excise tax... imposed on the difference between the market price of oil, which was technically referred to as the removal price, and a statutory 1979 base price that was adjusted quarterly for inflation and state severance taxes." The report also stated that the tax only generated $40 billion in net revenue though it was projected to generate $175 billion, and because the tax was an excise tax on oil produced domestically in the United States and not imposed on imported oil, it reduced domestic oil production by 1-5% while dependence on imported oil increased by 3-13%.

== Enactment ==
The 96th United States Congress was motivated to enact the tax by several factors:

- The Congress was concerned that the domestic oil industry would reap enormous revenues and profits as a result of the deregulation of price controls to allow domestic oil to reset to world oil price levels. Congress believed that the projected huge redistribution of income from energy consumers to energy producers would not be fair.
- Congress also felt the industry was not paying its fair share of federal taxes. The oil industry's low effective income tax rates were due to the availability of two oil industry tax deductions: the percentage depletion allowance, and the provision which permits companies to expense (deduct fully in the initial year) the intangible costs of drilling.
- In addition, Congress was looking for additional sources of revenue. Between 1961 and 1979, the federal budget was in deficit in every year but one (there was a small surplus in FY1969). The Congress's Joint Committee on Taxation projected the tax would generate, from 1980 to 1990, additional gross revenues of approximately $393 billion.

== Repeal ==
On August 23, 1988, amid low oil prices, the tax was repealed when President Ronald Reagan signed P.L. 100–418, The Omnibus Trade and Competitiveness Act of 1988. Reagan had objected to the tax during his 1980 presidential campaign and promised to repeal it. As with the enactment, Congress was motivated by several factors:

- A principal issue in the debate over the Act's repeal was that the original forecast of revenues turned out to have been significantly overestimated, reflecting overestimates of crude oil prices. From 1980 to 1990 the tax generated gross revenue of about $80 billion, or 80% less than the projected amount of $393 billion.
- Congress was also concerned that the tax had increased the nation's dependence on imported oil. The tax was an excise tax on oil produced domestically in the United States; it was not imposed on imported oil. Domestic oil producers could not shift the tax forward as a higher oil selling price because the purchaser would merely substitute imported or tax-exempt crude. The tax caused domestic oil production losses in every year until 1986, when crude prices declined below adjusted base prices resulting in zero windfall profit tax. Over the 1980–1986 period, it is estimated that, depending on the assumed supply curve price elasticity, the tax reduced domestic oil production from between 320 million barrels (1.2% of domestic production) and 1,268 million barrels (4.8% of domestic production). The effect of reducing domestic oil production was to increase the level of imported oil. The estimated production losses caused by the tax, as a % of the actual level of imported oil, under three assumed supply curve elasticities range from 3.2% of total imports to 12.7% of imports for this period, depending on price elasticity.
- The tax also may have distorted the way resources were allocated within the oil industry. Since the tax was imposed on oil production — i.e., upon its removal and sale — extraction (and other upstream operations) was penalized and other aspects of the business (refining and marketing, the downstream operations) become relatively favored. Thus it created financial incentives to shift resources from exploration and drilling to refining and marketing.
- The tax also appeared to be a complicated tax to comply with and to administer. A 1984 General Accounting Office report called it "perhaps the largest and most complex tax ever levied on a U.S. industry." The windfall profit tax was imposed on oil producers when taxable crude oil was removed from the oil-producing property. Any individual or business with an economic interest in an oil-producing property was considered as a producer and subject to the tax. There were four kinds of producers — independent producers, integrated oil companies, royalty owners (landowners), and tax-exempt parties. There were about one million oil producers (persons, institutions, and businesses) in the United States in 1984. Sometimes there were hundreds of people having a fractional economic interest in a single oil-producing property. Throughout the compliance process, many tax return forms and information forms were required. The process was further complicated due to numerous exceptions to the basic general rules and due to possible interactions between the windfall profit tax rules, the personal and corporate income tax rules, energy regulations, and state and local tax and energy laws. After 1986, the WPT imposed little or no tax liability on oil producers because oil prices were below the threshold base prices that triggered it. Oil producers were obliged to comply with the paperwork requirements of the law, however, and the Internal Revenue Service (IRS) was compelled to administer the system despite the fact that the tax generated no revenue, reportedly spending about $15 million a year to do so.

Since 1988, no windfall profit tax has been enacted in the U.S., however, when gas prices once again reached record levels there was renewed pressure on the U.S. government to bring back the tax. At least nine bills that purported to tax windfall profits of crude oil producers were introduced in the 110th United States Congress during 2007-08 (HR 1500, HR 2372, HR 5800, HR 6000, S.1238, S.2761, S.2782, S.2991, S.3044) .

The windfall profit tax of the 1980s is not to be confused with the excess profit taxes of World War I, World War II, and the Korean War eras.
