= Fostering Connections to Success and Increasing Adoptions Act of 2008 =

The Fostering Connections to Success and Increasing Adoptions Act of 2008 (enacted as Public Law 110-351) was an Act of Congress in the United States signed into law by President George W. Bush on October 7, 2008. It was previously unanimously passed in both the House of Representatives and in the Senate. The law made numerous changes to the child welfare system, mostly to Title IV-E of the Social Security Act, which covers federal payments to states for foster care and adoption assistance. According to child welfare experts and advocates, the law made the most significant federal improvements to the child welfare system in over a decade.

== Changes ==
The new law made a number of changes to the child welfare system, which is primarily the responsibility of the states (the Federal government supports the states through funding and legislative initiatives). Major changes include:

- Allowing all states the option to provide kinship guardianship assistance payments, or payments to relative foster parents committed to caring permanently for a child who has been living with them for at least six months. This will help facilitate the transfer of children from state custody to relative guardianship in instances where a return home or adoption is not appropriate.
- Allowing states to provide IV-E funded foster care to children up to age 21, given that such a child is enrolled in school, a vocational program, is employed, or is unable to fulfill these requirements due to a medical condition. This option helps to facilitate a longer period of support for children up to age 21.
- Requiring case plans to ensure that foster care placements are not unduly disruptive of the child's education.
- Requiring states to develop a case plan for the oversight and coordination of health care services for children in foster care, in conjunction with the state Medicaid agency and other experts.
- Requiring states to make reasonable efforts to keep siblings together in foster care placements.
- Allowing, for the first time, tribes to receive federal funding to directly administer their own child welfare programs (previously, tribes had to negotiate with states to receive IV-E funding).
- Gradually "de-linking" a child's eligibility for adoption assistance payments from the outdated Aid to Families with Dependent Children standards, which had not been updated for inflation since 1996, as the program no longer existed. Because this provision costs money, the de-linking will occur over a period of nine years.

== Savings and costs ==
According to the Congressional Budget Office, the new law will reduce deficits by $12 million between 2009 and 2018, although it will initially increase direct spending by $323 million between 2009 and 2013.

== Leadership ==
In the House, Representative Jim McDermott (D-WA) and former Representative Jerry Weller (R-IL) were active in the legislation's drafting and eventual passage. In the Senate, Senators Max Baucus (D-MT) and Charles Grassley (R-IA) were leaders on the bill.

== Implementation ==
=== California's AB 12 Program ===
Having the largest foster care population in the United States, California was one of the first states to enact the Fostering Connections Act by enacting Assembly Bill 12 (AB 12, also referred to as the CA Fostering Connections to Success Act) in 2010. The law began to take effect in 2012.

All eligible foster youth are now able to participate in the AB 12 extended foster care program from their eighteenth birthday until their twenty-first birthday. Eligibility is determined by at least one of following in accordance to the federal requirements:

1. Completion of high school or obtaining a GED
2. Enrollment in university, community college, or a vocational educational program at least half time
3. Participation in an employment preparedness training program
4. Employment for at least 80 hours a month (20 hours a week)
5. Inability to any of the above due to a medical or mental disability

Those who participate in the AB12 program are considered non-minor dependents of the county in which they were placed into foster care. Foster youth are allowed to re-enter the program up until age 21 if they opted out earlier.

The AB12 program allows for two additional supervised independent living setting placements for non minor dependents. Transitional Housing Placement Plus Foster Care (THP - Plus - FC) provides housing and services to promote independence like case management, assistance with transportation, and job readiness training. Housing options under this type of placement include group homes and foster homes.

The second type of housing placement is the Supervised Independent Living Placement (SILP) and the most popular among foster youth as it allows for greater independence. SILP placements can include apartments, rooms for rent in a house, college dormitories, and single-room occupancy hotels. These placements must be assessed and approved by the county, except for university housing.

==== Challenges in the Implementation of AB12 ====
If a nonminor dependent is placed out-of-state, the sending and receiving agencies must undergo a ten-step process in accordance with the Interstate Compact on the Placement of Children. Even if a nonminor dependent is living in an out-of-state SILP placement, case managers are required to have monthly face-to-face visits with each youth. In addition, case managers are required to visit youth who are placed in another county within California, and cases are not transferred from one county to another.

Having to travel substantial distances every month adds substantial travel costs and more strain on the substantial caseload social workers have. The recommended number of cases that a worker should serve according to the Child Welfare League of America (CWLA) is at most 12-15 children while some agencies already have caseloads that may exceed 40 cases per worker.

Notable organizations that were involved in various stages of drafting, and revising the statute, and lobbying Congress included:

- Alliance for Children and Families
- American Academy of Pediatrics
- American Bar Association's Center on Children and the Law
- Casey Family Programs
- Center for Law and Social Policy
- Child Welfare League of America
- Children's Defense Fund
- Court Appointed Special Advocates
- National Conference of State Legislatures
- Voices for America's Children

== Future of the legislation ==
Since its signing in 2008, states are moving to implement the various changes in the law and different states are at different stages in implementation. A Fostering Connections Resource Center was also created to help disseminate information about the law.
