= Revenue Act of 1935 =

American law

The Revenue Act of 1935, 49 Stat. 1014 (August 30, 1935), raised federal income tax on higher income levels by introducing the "Wealth Tax". It was a progressive tax that took up to 75 percent of the highest incomes (over $1 million per year). However, during the same period, Congress also passed the Social Security Act of 1935, which introduced payroll taxes that are often characterized as regressive.

President Franklin D. Roosevelt signed the act into law despite significant opposition from business interests, wealthy individuals, and fiscal conservatives across the political spectrum. At the time, the legislation was popularly referred to as the "Soak the Rich" tax due to its focus on high-incomes. The Revenue Act of 1937 revised tax laws and regulations to increase government revenues collected from high-income citizens, and to address legal methods used to minimize taxes paid.

== Predicted revenue increase ==
Congress estimated that annual revenue would be increased by approximately $250 million when the new law took effect.

Predicted annual revenue increase (in millions)

- $45 Surtax on Rich
- $80 Estate tax on rich
- $21 Gift tax on rich
- $37 Corporation taxes
- $44 capital stock tax
- $10 excess profits tax
- $20 intercompany dividends
- –$15 Corporation charitable deductions
- $250 total tax increase

== Tax on Individuals ==
A Normal Tax and a Surtax were levied against the net income of individuals as shown in the following table.

Revenue Act of 1935; Normal Tax and Surtax on Individuals 49 Stat. 1014
Net Income (dollars)	Normal Rate (percent)	Surtax Rate (percent)	Combined Rate (percent)
0	4	0	4
4,000	4	4	8
6,000	4	5	9
8,000	4	6	10
10,000	4	7	11
12,000	4	8	12
14,000	4	9	13
16,000	4	11	15
18,000	4	13	17
20,000	4	15	19
22,000	4	17	21
26,000	4	19	23
32,000	4	21	25
38,000	4	24	28
44,000	4	27	31
50,000	4	31	35
56,000	4	35	39
62,000	4	39	43
68,000	4	44	47
74,000	4	47	51
80,000	4	51	55
90,000	4	55	59
100,000	4	58	62
150,000	4	60	64
200,000	4	62	66
250,000	4	64	68
300,000	4	66	70
400,000	4	68	70
500,000	4	70	74
750,000	4	72	76
1,000,000	4	73	77
2,000,000	4	74	78
5,000,000	4	75	79

- Exemption of $1,000 for single filers and $2,500 for married couples and heads of family. A $400 exemption for each dependent under 18.

== Evaluations ==
Liberal historian Paul Conkin concluded that the 1935 tax law in which the graduated rates were first imposed on corporations, "neither soaked the rich, penalized bigness, nor significantly helped balance the budget." Nevertheless, angry critics complained that it was like the camel's nose under the tent, creating a precedent that would soon grow rapidly in magnitude.

== See also ==
- Revenue Act of 1936, which included a highly controversial corporate tax on undistributed profits

== External Resources ==
Text of Revenue Act of 1937
