= Tax Adjustment Act of 1966 =

United States law

The Tax Adjustment Act of 1966 was one of several major tax enactments by the United States Congress in 1966. Among other things, it modified the withholding of taxes: instead of a 14% withhold rate, it introduced a graduated rate through 30%. It added section 3402 to the Internal Revenue Code, allowing a taxpayer to elect additional withholding allowances. Additionally, it introduced section 276 to the Code, allowing a deduction for payments made for advertising in political programs or admission charges to political conventions.

Other significant tax legislation in 1966 included the Foreign Investors Tax Act of 1966, the Act Suspending the Investment Credit and Accelerated Depreciation and the Federal Tax Lien Act.
