= Wendell H. Ford Aviation Investment and Reform Act for the 21st Century =

2000 United States law

- Other short titles: Aviation Investment and Reform Act for the 21st Century
- Long title: An Act to amend title 49, United States Code, to reauthorize programs of the Federal Aviation Administration, and for other purposes.
- Acronyms (colloquial): AIR21
- Nicknames: Public Law 106-181
- Enacted by: the 106th United States Congress

Citations
- Public law: Pub. L. 106–181 (text) (PDF)
- Statutes at Large: 114 Stat. 61

Codification
- Acts amended: Federal Aviation Act of 1958
- Titles amended: Title 49 of the United States Code

Legislative history
- Introduced in the House as H.R. 1000 by Rep. Bud Shuster (R–PA) on March 4, 1999; Committee consideration by House Transportation and Infrastructure; Budget; Rules; Senate Commerce, Science, and Transportation; Passed the House on June 15, 1999 (316–110); Passed the Senate on October 5, 1999 (Passed by voice vote); Reported by the joint conference committee on October 20, 1999 (First conference); agreed to by the Senate on March 8, 2000 (Conference report) (82–17); Signed into law by President Bill Clinton on April 5, 2000

The Wendell H. Ford Aviation Investment and Reform Act for the 21st Century is a United States federal law, signed on 5 April 2000, seeking to improve airline safety. It is popularly called "AIR 21," and is also known as Public Law 106-181.

== Background ==
On September 11, 1991, Continental Express Flight 2574, an Embraer EMB 120 Brasilia carrying 14 people, crashed as it was approaching Intercontinental Airport in Houston, Texas, killing all 14 people on board.

The National Transportation Safety Board (NTSB) investigation revealed that screws had been removed from the horizontal stabilizer during maintenance the night before the accident and, following a shift change, the screws were not replaced. NTSB cited the failure of airline maintenance and inspection personnel to adhere to proper maintenance and quality assurance procedures. The failure of Federal Aviation Administration (FAA) surveillance to detect and verify compliance with approved procedures was cited as a contributing factor.

Some months after, the same airline had a similar incident when a plane was forced to return to the airport after bolts had been removed from a wing panel. NTSB decried that even a fatal accident and an FAA NASIP inspection weren't enough to overcome what appears to have been corporate culture.

According to Meshkati (1997), the crash of Continental Express Flight 2574 was the most dramatic turning point for "safety culture" in the United States. As a member of the National Transportation Safety Board (NTSB) at that time, Dr. John Lauber suggested that the probable cause of this accident included "The failure of Continental Express management to establish a corporate culture which encouraged and enforced adherence to approved maintenance and quality assurance procedures". As a result of this and other similar aviation accidents, safety culture came to the forefront as the exclusive topic at the U.S. National Summit on Transportation Safety, hosted by the NTSB in 1997.

== Enactment ==
AIR 21 was known as H.R. 1000 in 106th Congress, second session. Rep. Bud Shuster (R-Pa.) introduced it on 4 March 1999. It was enacted on 5 April 2000. Upon signing the bill into law, President Bill Clinton stated:

This bill contains many new provisions to advance aviation safety. Of particular note is the inclusion of the "Aircraft Safety Act of 1999," which my Administration proposed to help stop the indefensible practice of manufacturing, distributing, and installing fraudulently represented, nonconforming aircraft parts. Several significant provisions to provide "whistleblower" protections to the Federal Aviation Administration (FAA) and air industry employees, to close a potential loophole in the prosecution of hazardous materials cases, and to combat "air rage" incidents in flight, will also address real safety concerns we face today.

== Safety provisions ==
AIR 21 set requirements for safety equipment for specific aircraft, added consumer and employee protection provisions, and imposed new requirements for commercial air tour operations over national parks.

Title V established civil penalties for individuals who interfere with or jeopardize the safety of a cabin crew or other passengers. This provision seeks to deter "air rage."

Section 507 modified the sanction for transporting hazardous materials by removing the requirement that the person have knowledge of the regulation related to the transportation of hazardous materials. However, it permits consideration of lack of knowledge in mitigation of the penalty. This requirement is at 49 U.S.C. 46312.

Section 401 of the bill prohibited a state or local government from preventing people associated with disaster counseling services who are not licensed in that state from providing those services for up to 60 days after an aviation accident. Section 402 of the bill would expand a current preemption of state liability laws by limiting the liability of air carriers that provide information concerning flight reservations to the families of passengers involved in airline accidents. Air carriers are already provided immunity from state liability laws for providing passenger lists under these circumstances. Because neither mandate would require state or local governments to expend funds or to change their laws, CBO estimates that any costs associated with these mandates would be insignificant.

In Section 725, the act required the Federal Aviation Administration to contract with the National Academy of Sciences for an independent study of the air quality in passenger cabins.

== Consumer protections ==
Title II sought to improve consumer access in all regions of the United States, including those in small communities and rural and remote areas, to affordable, regularly scheduled air service.

Section 221 made it an unfair or deceptive practice for any air carrier, or ticket agent utilizing electronically transmitted tickets for air transportation to fail to notify the purchaser of such a ticket of its expiration date. It did so by amending 49 U.S.C. 41712(b). Section 224 required airlines to file individual customer service plans with the Secretary of Transportation.

Title IV made the Death on the High Seas Act (DOHSA) inapplicable to aviation incidents, thereby broadening the circumstances under which relatives can seek compensation for the death of a family member in an aviation incident over the ocean.

AIR 21 also includes a legislative advance for air travelers with disabilities.

== Financial provisions ==
The Congressional Budget Office estimated that AIR 21 would result in additional outlays totaling about $56 billion over the 2000-2004 period.

Title I authorized the appropriation of $47.6 billion for FAA operations, facilities, and equipment for fiscal years 2000 through 2004. Title I also provided $19.2 billion in contract authority for the FAA's airport improvement program for fiscal years 2000 through 2004. It provided an additional $7.1 billion in contract authority for the airport improvement program (AIP) over the 2000-2004 period (above the $2.4 billion a year assumed in the baseline). It allowed airports to charge higher passenger facility fees. AIR 21 took the Airport and Airway Trust Fund (AATF) off-budget and exempted AATF spending from the discretionary spending caps, pay-as-you-go procedures, and Congressional budget controls.

This provision was a goal of the Aircraft Owners and Pilots Association which sought to unlock the aviation trust fund.

Title VII extended the war risk insurance program and prohibited the FAA from charging fees for certain services. This title provided that, of the amounts appropriated for FAA operations in fiscal year 2000, $2 million may be used to eliminate a backlog of equal employment opportunity complaints at the Department of Transportation (DOT).

== Employee protections ==
Title VI provided whistleblower protection for employees of air carriers who notify authorities that their employer is violating a federal law relating to air carrier safety. The bill set up a complaint and investigation process within the Department of Labor (DOL). The time limit for employees to make such complaints in writing to the Occupational Safety and Health Administration is 90 days from the date of each adverse employment action.

== Public Availability of Airmen Records ==
Section 715, "Public Availability of Airmen Records", allows the Federal Aviation Administration to release the names, addresses, and ratings held by nearly all pilots with a medical certificate. This includes the release of information to private businesses, including those not necessarily having any relation to aviation safety (the intent of the bill). The FAA must notify airmen of this clause via mail and notify them that they have 90 days to opt out of the inclusion of their personal information into the public record. If no action is taken within 90 days, then an opt-in is assumed.

== See also ==
- Aircraft Owners and Pilots Association
- Whistleblower
- Airport and Airway Trust Fund
- Wendell Ford
