= Tax Reduction Act of 1975 =

- Long title: An act to amend the Internal Revenue Code of 1954 to provide for a refund of 1974 individual income taxes, to increase the low income allowance and the percentage standard deduction, to provide a credit for personal exemptions and a credit for certain earned income, to increase the investment credit and the surtax exemption, to reduce percentage depletion for oil and gas, and for other purposes.
- Enacted by: the 94th United States Congress
- Effective: January 1, 1974

Citations
- Public law: Pub. L. 94–12

Legislative history
- Introduced in the House as H.R. 2166 by Al Ullman (D–OR) on January 28, 1975; Committee consideration by United States House Committee on Ways and Means; Passed the House on February 27, 1975 (317–97); Passed the Senate on March 21, 1975 (60–29) with amendment; House agreed to Senate amendment on March 26, 1975 (287–125) with further amendment; Senate agreed to House amendment on March 26, 1975 (45–16); Signed into law by President Gerald Ford on March 29, 1975

The United States Tax Reduction Act of 1975 provided a 10-percent rebate on 1974 tax liability ($200 cap). It created a temporary $30 general tax credit for each taxpayer and dependent.

It started the Earned Income Tax Credit (EITC), which, at the time, provided an income tax credit to certain individuals. The EITC gave a tax credit to individuals who had at least one dependent, maintained a household, and had earned income of less than $8,000 during the year. The tax credit was $400 for individuals with earned income of less than $4,000. The tax credit was an amount less than $400 for individuals whose income was between $4,000 and $7,999 during the year.

The investment tax credit was temporarily increased to 10 percent through 1976.

The minimum standard deduction was temporarily increased to $1,900 (joint returns) for one year.

For one year, the percentage standard deduction was increased to 16 percent of adjusted gross income, up to $2,600 if married filing jointly, $2,300 if single, or $1,300 if married filing separately.

The bill became public law 94–12 when it was signed by President Gerald Ford on March 29, 1975.
