= Tax Reduction and Simplification Act of 1977 =

- Long title: An Act to reduce individual and business income taxes and to provide tax simplification and reform.
- Acronyms (colloquial): TRSA
- Nicknames: Intergovernmental Anti-recession Assistance Act
- Enacted by: the 95th United States Congress
- Effective: May 23, 1977

Citations
- Public law: 95-30
- Statutes at Large: 91 Stat. 126

Codification
- Titles amended: 26 U.S.C.: Internal Revenue Code

Legislative history
- Introduced in the House as H.R. 3477 by Al Ullman (D–OR) on February 16, 1977; Committee consideration by House Ways and Means, House Appropriations, Senate Finance; Passed the House on March 8, 1977 (282-131, in lieu of H.Res. 360); Passed the Senate on April 29, 1977 (73-7); Reported by the joint conference committee on May 6, 1977; agreed to by the House on May 16, 1977 (252-134) and by the Senate on May 16, 1977 (Agreed); Signed into law by President Jimmy Carter on May 23, 1977

The Tax Reduction and Simplification Act of 1977 was passed by the 95th United States Congress and signed into law by President Jimmy Carter on May 23, 1977.

It replaced the percentage standard deduction and minimum standard deduction with a single standard deduction of $3,200 (joint returns) and temporarily extended the general tax credit (maximum of $35/capita or 2% of $9,000 income) through 1978.

== See also ==
- Congressional Budget and Impoundment Control Act of 1974
