= Surface and Air Transportation Programs Extension Act of 2011 =

Federal tax extension intended to fund federal transportation infrastructure

The Surface and Air Transportation Program Extension Act of 2011 became a United States law when President Barack Obama signed the Act on September 16, 2011 (Public Law No. 112-30). The law extends taxes which fund federal highway expenditures through March and the Federal Aviation Administration through January. The Surface and Air Transportation Programs Extension Act of 2011 is a direct result of an agreement which was reached by the House and Senate majority leaders. This extension act was a top priority to Congress because federal highway and FAA funding was about to expire.

== Voting facts ==
The bill passed through the United States House of Representatives on September 13, 2011, and through the United States Senate on September 15, 2011. President Obama signed the bill on September 16, 2011.

== Committee assignments ==
Committees are formed to critique the proposed bill and to aid in lobbying to the United States Congress for consideration. The Surface and Air Transportation Programs Extension Act of 2011 was on the House Transportation and Infrastructure Committee, and the House Ways and Means Committee.

== Amendments ==
On September 15, 2011, two amendments were introduced to the legislation. Senator Paul, a Republican from Kentucky, introduced both amendments. The first amendment set limits on the Highway Trust Fund, and the second amendment decreased disbursements of the Federal Aviation Administration.

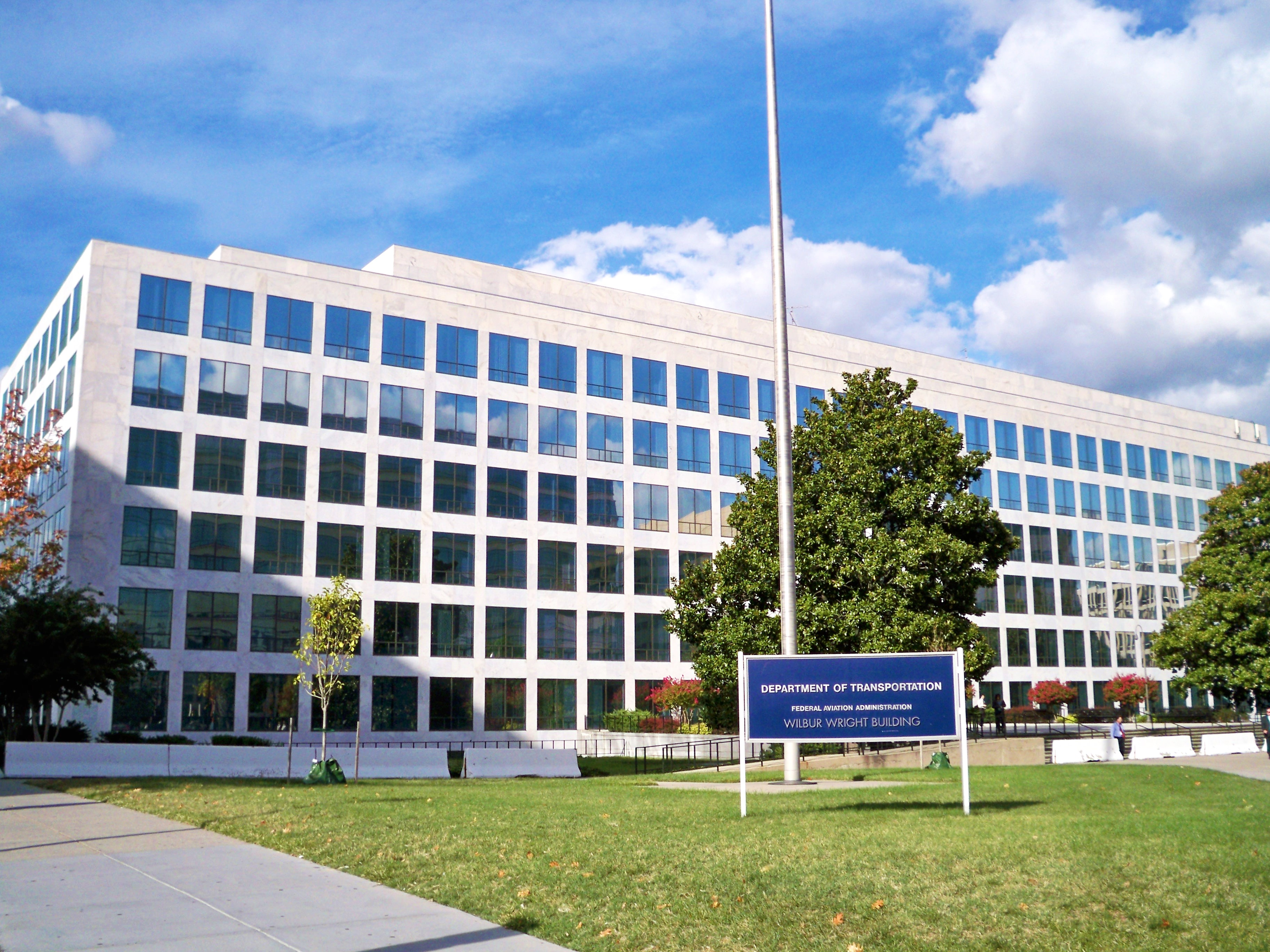
FAA Headquarters, Washington, D.C.

== Bill-to-law highlights ==
- Highway programs: limit of $42.5 billion; authorizations for surface transportation research extended
- Highway safety programs: authorization of $335 million administered by the National Highway Traffic Safety Administration broken down with $117.5 million going to Chapter 4 Highway Safety Programs; $54.122 million going to Highway Safety Research and Development; $12.5 million given towards Occupant Protection Incentive Grants; $24.25 given towards Safety Belt Performance Grants; $17.25 given towards State Traffic Safety Information Systems Improvements; $69.5 million given towards Alcohol-Impaired Driving Counter-Measures Incentives Grant Program; $2.05 million given towards National Driver Register; $14.5 million given towards High Visibility Enforcement Program; $3.5 million given towards Motorcyclist Safety, $3.5 million given towards Child Safety and Child Booster Seat Safety Incentive Program; and $12.66 million given towards Safe, Accountable, Flexible, Efficient Transportation Equity Act: A Legacy for Users (SAFETEA-LU) Administrative Expenses (signed by President George W. Bush on August 10, 2005).
- Transit programs: the bill allowed for the obligation of upwards to $5.1 billion administered by the Federal Transit Administration allocation of $4.18 billion for formula and bus grants; $800 million for capital investment grants; $29.5 million for research and university centers; and $49.45 million for Federal Transit administrative costs
- Provisions impacting essential air service: the Essential Air Service program was enacted to guarantee that small communities in the United States are served by certified airlines and maintained commercial service. H.R. 2887 (Surface and Air Transportation Programs Extension Act of 2011) changes the EAS by currently allocating funds out of the Airport and Airway Trust Fund. There will be $150 million taken from this fund from January–April 2012. Legislation has then agreed to have $50 million given each fiscal year from administrative accounts of over flight fees. There will an additional allocation of $2 million from January–April 2012 for the Small Community Air Service Development program. This program allows the Transportation Department to offer grants to small cities not already receiving sufficient air carrier service.

== Extension of federal-aid highways ==
Funds for federal aid to highways will be allocated from the Highway Trust Fund, but none to be taken from the Mass Transit Account, for projects between the time-frame of October 1, 2011 - March 31, 2012.

== Summary details ==
Extended funds have been allocated towards:

- Research and development, including deployment initiatives within surface transportation
- Training and education
- Bureau of Transportation statistics and analysis
- Research within intelligent transportation systems

== Transportation program funds extended ==
- Interstate and national highway system
- Congestion mitigation and air quality improvement
- Highway safety improvement
- Surface transportation
- Highway bridge

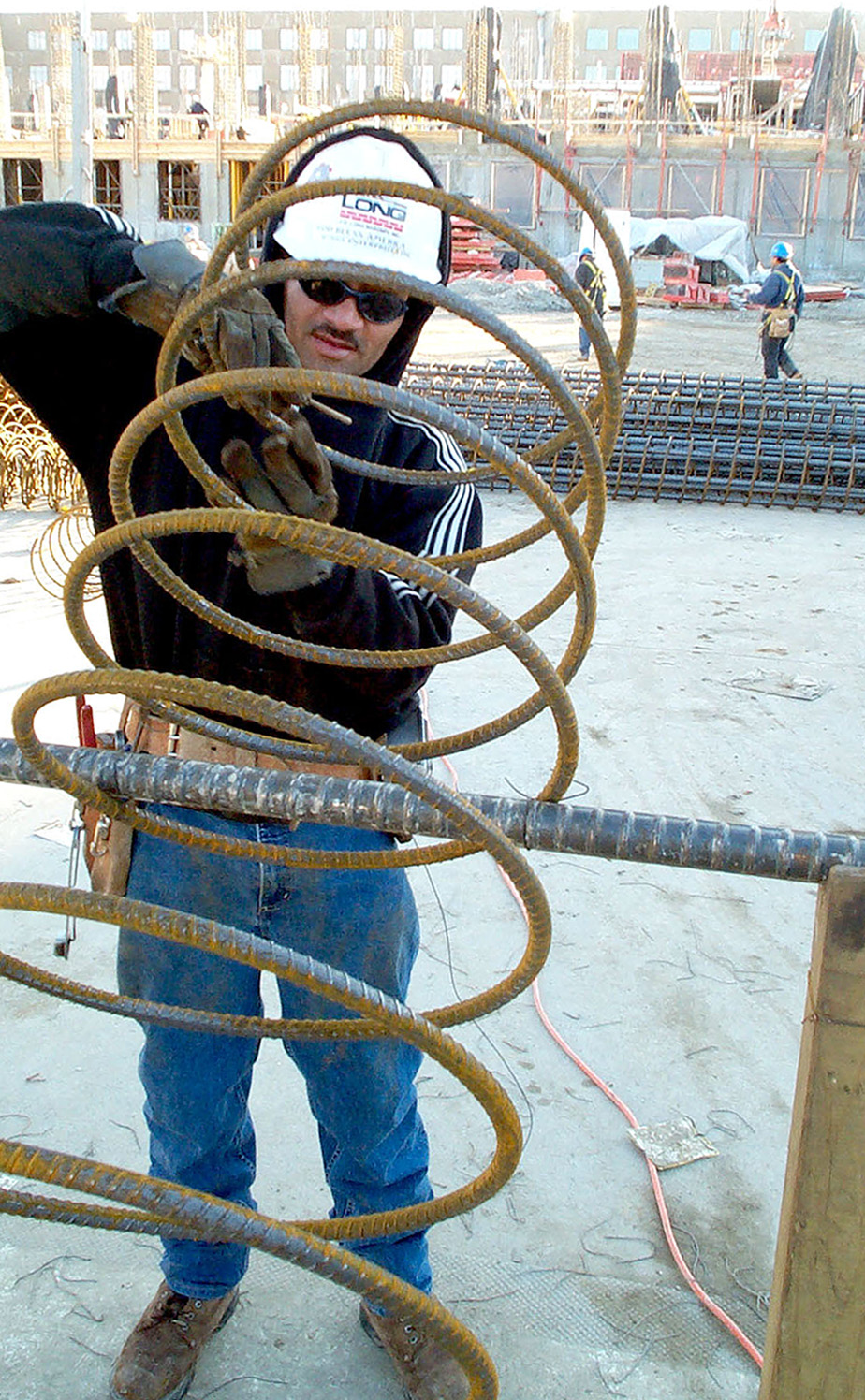
A construction worker with column reinforcement steel

== Details ==
The Surface and Air Transportation Act provided funding for:

- highway construction
- bridge repair
- mass transit systems
- keeping construction workers employed

== Benefits relating to the passing of the bill ==
- 4,000 workers did not go one day without pay
- $1 billion in highway funding did not go unattended
- over 1 million workers were able to keep their jobs

== Arguments against the temporary fix ==
Although the American Trucking Association (ATA) is relieved that the act was extended ensuring further job proposals, the organization feels it is only a quick fix that will essentially boost employment temporarily. The organization is pushing for passing multi-year legislation, instead of, multi-month legislation. The organization feels that this is a long overdue problem that is being fixed on a short, temporary basis.

The ATA's president, Bill Graves, is not convinced, and even though $27.5 billion in the jobs proposal initiated by Obama is going to help boost the nation's economy, by way of, funding needed repairs and expanding roads and bridges. It is only scratching the surface to the real problem at hand. Graves is skeptical of Obama's plans, in regards to, establishing an infrastructure bank and increasing other taxes to pay for roads, bridges, and other programs in the jobs bill.

== American Society of Civil Engineers ==
The American Society of Civil Engineers spoke loudly to Congress regarding passing the Surface and Air Transportation Programs Extension Act of 2011, and to increase funding to aid in the country's broken infrastructure system. The programs were extended through to January 31, 2012. According to the "Failure to Act" division, if the United States does not invest in surface transportation programs soon, she will lose $900 billion.

== Related Obama administration political initiatives ==
The logo of the Transportation Security Administration.

- Surface Transportation Security Priority Assessment (March, 2010): part of Obama's Homeland Security initiative, this assessment seeks to analyze the United States surface transportation system, which consists of Mass Transit, Highways, Freight Rail, and Pipelines. This interdependent network services millions of communities every day and is critical to the United States' economy. With more terrorist attacks on the world's mass transit systems, securing the surface transportation network from attacks requires efforts from many levels, including, but not limited to, all levels of government, the private and nonprofit sectors, communities, and citizens alike.
- The American Jobs Act: the key facts to this act includes tax cuts to help America's small businesses hire more people and grow in the industry, putting more workers back to work and rebuilding and modernizing America in the process, building pathways for Americans looking for job opportunities, tax cuts for the American worker and his/her family, and funded by Obama's long-term deficit reduction plan.

== Main agencies in charge ==
1. Transportation Security Administration (TSA)
2. Government Coordinating Council (GCC)
3. Sector Coordinating Council (SCC)
4. State, Local, Tribal, and Territorial Government Coordinating Council (SLTTGCC)

== See also ==
- Federal Highway Administration
- Federal Aviation Administration
- Policy
- Highways
- Road Transport
- Infrastructure
