= Medicare and Medicaid Extenders Act of 2010 =

- Long title: Medicare and Medicaid Extenders Act of 2010
- Enacted by: the 111th United States Congress

Citations
- Public law: 111-309

Legislative history
- Introduced in the House as H.R. 4994 by John Lewis on April 13, 2010; Committee consideration by Committee on Ways and Means, Committee on Budget; Passed the House on April 14, 2010 (399 - 9); Passed the Senate on December 8, 2010 (Unanimous Consent) with amendment; House agreed to Senate amendment on December 9, 2010 (409 - 2); Signed into law by President Barack Obama on December 15, 2010

The Medicare and Medicaid Extenders Act of 2010 is a federal law of the United States, enacted in 2010. The law was first introduced into the House as H.R. 4994 on April 13, 2010, by Rep. John Lewis (D-GA) with 20 cosponsors. It was then referred to the House Committee on Ways and Means and the House Committee on the Budget.

The bill was signed by President Barack Obama on December 15, 2010, after passing in Congress.

== Elements of the law ==
The law prevented implementation of the 2010 conversion factor for the Medicare Sustainable Growth Rate (SGR). The SGR determines how much money Medicare will pay physicians and other health care providers for health services. Pursuant to this law, the SGR will not be modified until January 1, 2012.
