= Government Reports Elimination Act of 2014 =

- Long title: To provide for the elimination or modification of Federal reporting requirements.
- Announced in: the 113th United States Congress
- Sponsored by: Rep. Darrell E. Issa (R, CA-49)
- Number of co-sponsors: 2

Codification
- U.S.C. sections affected: 38 U.S.C. § 8110, 38 U.S.C. § 8125, 38 U.S.C. § 7307, 10 U.S.C. § 117, 49 U.S.C. § 60130, and others.
- Agencies affected: Government Accountability Office, Comptroller General of the United States, Executive Office of the President, United States Congress, United States Department of State, United States Department of the Treasury, Department of Health and Human Services, United States Department of Defense

Legislative history
- Introduced in the House as H.R. 4194 by Rep. Darrell E. Issa (R, CA-49) on March 11, 2014; Committee consideration by United States House Committee on Oversight and Government Reform; Passed the House on April 28, 2014 (voice vote)

The Government Reports Elimination Act of 2014 (H.R. 4194) is a bill that eliminates 18 specific reports that various federal agencies are required to give to Congress and an additional 85 reports that they are required to prepare (not specifically for Congress).

The bill was introduced during the 113th United States Congress.

== Provisions of the bill ==
The bill eliminates a variety of reports that federal agencies are required to prepare for Congress or the general public. An example of an eliminated report includes "annual summaries of airport financial reports." Another example is a report "on the waiver of certain sanctions against North Korea."

== Congressional Budget Office report ==
This summary is based largely on the summary provided by the Congressional Budget Office, as ordered reported by the House Committee on Oversight and Government Reform on March 12, 2014, with a subsequent amendment in the nature of a substitute provided on April 21, 2014. This is a public domain source.

H.R. 4194 eliminates requirements for 18 federal entities to prepare specific reports for the Congress. Based on information from the Office of Management and Budget and some affected agencies, the Congressional Budget Office (CBO) estimates that implementing the bill would reduce costs that are subject to appropriation by about $1 million over the next five years. Enacting H.R. 4194 would not affect direct spending or revenues; therefore, pay-as-you-go procedures do not apply.

H.R. 4194 eliminates the requirement to prepare 85 reports that are produced by numerous federal agencies, including: the Departments of Agriculture, Commerce, Defense, Education, Energy, Homeland Security, Housing and Urban Development, Interior, Labor, State, Transportation, Treasury, and Veterans Affairs, and the Corporation for National and Community Service, the Environmental Protection Agency, the Executive Office of the President, the Government Accountability Office, and the Office of the Director of National Intelligence. By reducing the number of reports that must be prepared and printed, implementing H.R. 4194 would reduce the administrative costs of those agencies.

The bill contains no intergovernmental or private-sector mandates as defined in the Unfunded Mandates Reform Act and imposes no costs on state, local or tribal governments.

== Procedural history ==
The Government Reports Elimination Act of 2014 was introduced into the United States House of Representatives on March 11, 2014, by Rep. Darrell E. Issa (R, CA-49). The bill was referred to the United States House Committee on Oversight and Government Reform. On April 28, 2014, the bill was passed in the House in a voice vote.

== Debate and discussion ==
Rep. Issa (R-CA) argued in favor of the bill, calling it a "bipartisan reform that will save taxpayers money and streamline the government reports process." Issa argued that "Congress relies on accurate, timely reports to inform its spending and policy decisions, but outdated or duplicative reports are simply a waste of government resources."

Rep. Gerry Connolly (D-VA) co-sponsored the bill. He argued that "in today's challenging fiscal environment, it is incumbent that we leverage every opportunity to streamline or eliminate antiquated agency reporting requirements that are duplicative, irrelevant or simply ignored."

== See also ==
- List of bills in the 113th United States Congress
