= Individual Income Tax Act of 1944 =

The Individual Income Tax Act of 1944, Pub. L. No. 315, Ch. 210, 58 Stat. 231 (May 29, 1944), raised individual income tax rates in the United States and repealed the 3% Victory Tax.

The Act also amended section 22 of the Internal Revenue Code of 1939 to provide a definition for "adjusted gross income".

It standardized the value of personal exemptions at $500 per person for those with adjusted gross income of $5,000 or more.

The provisions of the Act were generally effective for tax years that began after December 31, 1943.
