= Revenue Act of 1950 =

The United States Revenue Act of 1950 eliminated a portion of the individual income tax rate reductions from the 1945 and 1948 tax acts, and increased the top corporate rate from 38 percent to 45 percent.

This act changed the law regarding tax exempt organizations. It introduced the concept of Unrelated Business Income Tax, denied exemption to certain foundations and trusts, and denied deductions to donors of some organization which failed to meet certain standards.
