= Revenue Act of 1945 =

The United States Revenue Act of 1945, Public Law 214, 59 Stat. 556 (Nov. 8, 1945), repealed the excess profits tax, reduced individual income tax rates (the top rate fell from 94 percent to 86.45 percent), and reduced corporate tax rates (the top rate dropped from 40 percent to 38 percent).
