= Revenue Act of 1971 =

The United States Revenue Act of 1971 reinstated the investment tax credit, repealed the 7% automobile excise tax, and increased the minimum standard deduction from $1,000 to $1,300.

Scheduled increases in the personal exemption amount and percentage standard deduction were accelerated.

The 1971 Revenue Act helped establish the system of presidential public funding used in the United States. The Revenue Act also placed limits on campaign spending by Presidential nominees who receive public money and a ban on all private contributions to them. Beginning with the 1973 tax year, individual taxpayers were able to designate $1 to be applied to the Presidential Election Campaign Fund.

== See also ==
- Federal Election Campaign Act of 1971
