= Revenue Act of 1943 =

U.S. law that increased taxes

The United States Revenue Act of 1943 increased federal excise taxes on, among other things, alcohol, jewelry, telephones, and admissions, and raised the excess profits tax rate from 90% to 95%.

The 5% Victory Tax was lowered to 3%, and the postwar credit repealed.
