= Revenue Act of 1962 =

The United States Revenue Act of 1962 established a 7% investment tax credit, and required information reporting to the government for interest and dividend payments.

== Background ==
There were Committee hearings in the United States Senate about H.R. 10650, where the National Constructors Association expressed reservations that the bill would not necessarily increase investment in manufacturing.

== Legacy ==
The Revenue Act of 1962 had some adverse effects on farmers.

There has been the subject of extensive appellate litigation that has cited the Act.

Senator Fred R. Harris criticized the Act in his 1973 book The New Populism for allowing corporations to deduct lobbying expenses from income taxes.
