= Revenue Act of 1941 =

The Revenue Act of 1941 permanently extended the temporary individual, corporate, and excise tax increases of 1940, increased the excess profits tax by 10 percentage points (top rate rose from 50 to 60 percent) and increased corporate tax rates 6-7 percentage points (top rate increased from 24 percent to 31 percent).

Some excise taxes were temporarily increased (on alcohol, tires, etc.) and the personal exemption fell from $2,000 to $1,500 (for married couples).

== Tax on corporations ==
=== Normal tax ===
A Normal Tax was levied on the net income of corporations as shown in the following table.

Revenue Act of 1941; Normal Tax on Corporations 55 Stat. 692
Net Income (dollars)	Rate (percent)
0	24
25,000	37

=== Surtax on Corporation ===
A Surtax was levied on the corporation surtax net income (i.e., net income less allowances and exemptions) of corporations as shown in the following table.

Revenue Act of 1941; Surtax on Corporations 55 Stat. 693
Corporation; Surtax; Net Income (dollars)	Rate (percent)
0	6
25,000	7

== Tax on individuals ==
A normal tax and a surtax were levied against the net income of individuals as shown in the following table.

Revenue Act of 1941; Normal Tax and Surtax on Individuals 55 Stat. 688
Net Income (dollars)	Normal Rate (percent)	Surtax Rate (percent)	Combined Rate (percent)
0	4	6	10
2,000	4	9	13
4,000	4	13	17
6,000	4	17	21
8,000	4	21	25
10,000	4	25	29
12,000	4	29	31
14,000	4	32	36
16,000	4	35	39
18,000	4	38	42
20,000	4	41	45
22,000	4	44	48
26,000	4	47	51
32,000	4	50	54
38,000	4	53	57
44,000	4	55	59
50,000	4	57	61
60,000	4	59	63
70,000	4	61	65
80,000	4	63	67
90,000	4	64	68
100,000	4	65	69
150,000	4	66	70
200,000	4	67	71
250,000	4	69	73
300,000	4	71	75
400,000	4	72	76
500,000	4	73	77
750,000	4	74	78
1,000,000	4	75	79
2,000,000	4	76	80
5,000,000	4	77	81

- Exemption of $750 for single filers and $1,500 for married couples and heads of family. A $400 exemption for each dependent under 18.
