= Revenue Act of 1921 =

United States tax legislation

- Long title: An Act To reduce and equalize taxation, to provide revenue, and for other purposes
- Enacted by: the 67th United States Congress
- Effective: November 23, 1921

Citations
- Public law: Public Law 67-98
- Statutes at Large: 42 Stat. 227

Codification
- Acts amended: Revenue Act of 1918
- Acts repealed: Wartime Excess Profits Tax
- U.S.C. sections created: Section 202(c)

Legislative history
- Introduced in the House of Representatives as H.R. 8245 by Joseph W. Fordney (R‑MI) on August 15, 1921; Committee consideration by House Committee on Ways and Means; Passed the House of Representatives on August 20, 1921 (274–125); Passed the Senate on November 7, 1921 (46–37); Reported by the joint conference committee on November 10 – November 19, 1921; agreed to by the House of Representatives on November 21, 1921 (232–110) and by the Senate on November 23, 1921 (39–29); Signed into law by President Warren G. Harding on November 23, 1921

Major amendments
- Revenue Act of 1924

The United States Revenue Act of 1921 (ch. 136, 42 Stat. 227, November 23, 1921) was the first Republican tax reduction following their landslide victory in the 1920 federal elections. New Secretary of the Treasury Andrew Mellon argued that significant tax reduction was necessary in order to spur economic expansion and restore prosperity.

The legislation repealed the excess profits tax imposed during World War I, as well as "the transportation taxes, some luxury and other taxes, reduces slightly the maximum surtaxes upon individual incomes and increases somewhat the personal exemptions of heads of families and dependents, permits net losses of one year to be offset against net income of following years, and provides for the final settlement of tax cases besides making some other changes in the previous statute." The top marginal rate on individuals fell from 73 to 58 percent by 1922, and preferential treatment for capital gains was introduced at a rate of 12.5 percent. Mellon had hoped for more significant tax reduction.

== History ==
The bill passed the House on August 20, 1921. It was passed by the Senate in amended form on November 7, 1921. It was sent to conference on November 10 before the House on November 21 and the Senate on November 23 voted in favor of a new version of the bill. President Harding signed the bill on November 23, 1921.

== Tax on Corporations ==
In 1921 a rate of 10 percent was levied on the net income of corporations and 12.5 percent levied thereafter.

== Tax on Individuals ==
A Normal Tax and a Surtax were levied against the net income of individuals as shown in the following table.

Revenue Act of 1921; Normal Tax and Surtax on Individuals 42 Stat. 233
Net Income	Normal Rate	Surtax applicable to 1921		Surtax applicable to 1922 and thereafter	
(dollars)	(percent)	Surtax Rate (percent)	Combined Rate (percent)	Surtax Rate (percent)	Combined Rate (percent)
0	4	0	4	0	4
4,000	8	0	8	0	8
5,000	8	1	9	0	8
6,000	8	2	10	1	9
8,000	8	3	11	1	9
10,000	8	4	12	2	10
12,000	8	5	13	3	11
14,000	8	6	14	4	12
16,000	8	7	15	5	13
18,000	8	8	16	6	14
20,000	8	9	17	8	16
22,000	8	10	18	9	17
24,000	8	11	19	10	18
26,000	8	12	20	11	19
28,000	8	13	21	12	20
30,000	8	14	22	13	21
32,000	8	15	23	15	23
34,000	8	16	24	15	23
36,000	8	17	25	16	24
38,000	8	18	26	17	25
40,000	8	19	27	18	26
42,000	8	20	28	19	27
44,000	8	21	29	20	28
46,000	8	22	30	21	29
48,000	8	23	31	22	30
50,000	8	24	32	23	31
52,000	8	25	33	24	32
54,000	8	26	34	25	33
56,000	8	27	35	26	34
58,000	8	28	36	27	35
60,000	8	29	37	28	36
62,000	8	30	38	29	37
64,000	8	31	39	30	38
66,000	8	32	40	31	39
68,000	8	33	41	32	40
70,000	8	34	42	33	41
72,000	8	35	43	34	42
74,000	8	36	44	35	43
76,000	8	37	45	36	44
78,000	8	38	46	37	45
80,000	8	39	47	38	46
82,000	8	40	48	39	47
84,000	8	41	49	40	48
86,000	8	42	50	41	49
88,000	8	43	51	42	50
90,000	8	44	52	43	51
92,000	8	45	53	44	52
94,000	8	46	54	45	53
96,000	8	47	55	46	54
98,000	8	48	56	47	55
100,000	8	52	60	48	56
150,000	8	56	64	49	57
200,000	8	60	68	50	58
300,000	8	63	71		
500,000	8	64	72		
1,000,000	8	65	73		

- Exemption of $1,000 for single filers and $2,500 for married couples and heads of family. A $400 exemption for each dependent under 18. Married couple exemption is reduced to $2,000 for net income over $5,000.
