= Job Creation and Worker Assistance Act of 2002 =

US federal legislation

The Job Creation and Worker Assistance Act of 2002 (Pub. L. 107–147 (text) (PDF), 116 Stat. 21), increased carryback of net operating losses to 5 years (through September 2003), extended the exception under Subpart F for active financing income (through 2006), and created 30 percent expensing for certain capital asset purchases (through September 2004).

The act was signed into law by President George W. Bush on March 9, 2002.
