= Revenue Act of 1937 =

United States federal legislation

The Revenue Act of 1937, Pub. L. No. 75-377, ch. 815, 50 Stat. 813 was entitled: “An act to provide revenue, equalize taxation, prevent tax evasion and avoidance, and for other purposes.”

In a contemporary article published in the journal of the American Bar Association, it was described as "not a Measure of Wide Scope." The author noted that it included changes "Relating to Domestic Personal Holding Companies." https://heinonline.org/HOL/LandingPage?handle=hein.journals/abaj23&div=211&id=&page=
