= Revenue Act of 1951 =

The United States Revenue Act of 1951 temporarily increased individual income tax rates through 1953, and temporarily raised corporate tax rates 5 percentage points through March 31, 1954.

Excise taxes on alcohol, tobacco, gasoline, and automobiles were also temporarily increased through March 31, 1954. The 1951 Act added $5.4 billion to annual flow of federal tax revenue.
