= Surtax =

Levy of tax on tax

A surtax, also known as a tax surcharge, is a tax levied upon another tax.

== Canada ==
The provincial portion of the value-added tax on goods and services in two Canadian jurisdictions, Quebec and Prince Edward Island, was formerly calculated as a surtax on the sticker price plus the federal Goods and Services Tax. On Prince Edward Island, provincial sales tax was assessed at 10% on top of the federal tax (as of 2013) of 5%, resulting in a total effective rate of 15.5% at the time of its repeal. The Quebec Sales Tax was 9.5%, also assessed on top of the federal tax of 5%, resulting in a total tax burden of 14.975; it, too, was changed in 2013 so as no longer to be a surtax.

== United Kingdom ==
In 1929, the supertax (which had been introduced in the Finance Act 1909 at the rate of 6 old pence in the pound (2.5%) on incomes over £5,000 per year) was renamed to surtax. By 1934, the rate was variable from 1 shilling to 7 shillings and sixpence in the pound (5% to 37.5%). It was replaced by income tax in 1973.

Historical list of top rates
Year	Income tax	Surtax	Total
1939–40	29%	41%	70%
1944–45	50%	48%	98%

== United States ==
Previous examples of a broadly-levied surtax in the United States include one imposed to help finance the Vietnam War during the Lyndon Johnson administration. It essentially consisted of calculating one's ordinary federal income tax liability and then adding another 10% to it, the amount of the surtax.

As the US income tax system at the time was highly progressive, the surtax was much higher on those with higher incomes, as a 10% surtax imposed on a tax rate of 20% would result in an overall rate of 22%, and the same surtax imposed on a rate of 50% would result in an overall rate of 55%.

Some antiwar protesters refused to pay the tax and stated that while they were not anarchists and understood the need for and the positive role played by government in many areas, they wanted none of their tax money going to a war that they felt was immoral. The surtax was repealed well before the Vietnam War ended.

Surtaxes can be imposed on other taxes. They are usually imposed on the grounds of moral justification, as they affect only persons who are already paying taxes, rather than extending taxation to new areas or persons who are not previously being taxed.

A surtax of 4.3 percent was recently proposed by Congress on incomes over $500,000 to alleviate the alterations to the Alternative Minimum Tax code in the United States.

A surtax was proposed as part of the 2009–2010 health care reform in the United States.

== See also ==
- Battle for trade
- Double taxation
- Federal Unemployment Tax Act
