= Food Quality Protection Act =

US law about pesticides

Food Quality Protection Act of 1996
- Other short titles: Minor Use Crop Protection Act of 1995
- Long title: An Act to amend the Federal Insecticide, Fungicide, and Rodenticide Act and the Federal Food, Drug, and Cosmetic Act, and for other purposes.
- Acronyms (colloquial): FQPA
- Nicknames: Food Quality Protection Act of 1995
- Enacted by: the 104th United States Congress
- Effective: August 3, 1996

Citations
- Public law: 104-170
- Statutes at Large: 110 Stat. 1489

Codification
- Acts amended: Federal Insecticide, Fungicide, and Rodenticide Act; Federal Food, Drug, and Cosmetic Act
- Titles amended: 7 U.S.C.: Agriculture
- U.S.C. sections amended: 7 U.S.C. ch. 6 § 136 et seq.; 7 U.S.C. ch. 6 § 136a-1, 7; 7 U.S.C. ch. 6 §§ 136d, 136q, 136w

Legislative history
- Introduced in the House as H.R. 1627 by Thomas J. Bliley, Jr. (R–VA) on May 12, 1995; Committee consideration by House Agriculture, House Commerce; Passed the House on July 23, 1996 (417-0, Roll call vote 339, via Clerk.House.gov); Passed the Senate on July 24, 1996 (passed unanimous consent); Signed into law by President Bill Clinton on August 3, 1996

The Food Quality Protection Act (FQPA), or H.R.1627, was passed unanimously by Congress in 1996 and was signed into law by President Bill Clinton on August 3, 1996. The FQPA standardized the way the Environmental Protection Agency (EPA) would manage the use of pesticides and amended the Federal Insecticide, Fungicide, and Rodenticide Act and the Federal Food, Drug, and Cosmetic Act. It mandated a health-based standard for pesticides used in foods, provided special protections for babies and infants, streamlined the approval of safe pesticides, established incentives for the creation of safer pesticides, and required that pesticide registrations remain current.

One of the most prominent sections of the act, the specified protections for babies and infants, was the topic of the National Academy of Sciences' 1993 report, Pesticides in the Diets of Infants & Children. The EPA has cited this report as a catalyst for the creation of the FQPA.

== Background ==
Legislation similar to the FQPA was drafted and presented to Congress in 1995 but was never acted on. In 1996, the political landscape had changed and new pressures to act on pesticide control reform surfaced. In 1990, a coalition of environmental groups sued the EPA for failing to enforce the Delaney clause (California ex. rel. Van de Kamp v. Reilly). The Delaney clause, a provision in the Food Additives Amendment of the Federal Food, Drug, and Cosmetic Act, banned all food that contained any trace amount of any pesticide that may cause cancer. Although the EPA argued that the legislation was outdated and should not apply to the current situation, the coalition won in 1995 and the EPA was slated to ban 80 pesticides in late 1996. Under these new, more urgent circumstances, Congress was able to pass a bill that was celebrated by both sides of the debate; farmers, food processors and pesticide manufactures were glad to see the Delaney Clause go, while environmental groups and consumer advocates were pleased to have a formalized safety standard with an added emphasis on children. John Cady, president of the National Food Processors Association, praised the legislation for being "...based on modern, real-world science".

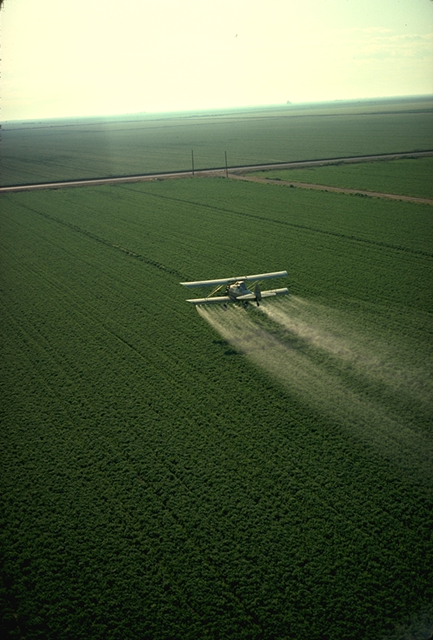
A cropduster spraying pesticide on a field

== FQPA requirements ==
The Food Quality Protection Act of 1996 has the following requirements:

=== Improved health standards for food commodities ===
The FQPA established a new safety standard (reasonable certainty of no harm) that must be applied to all food commodities. In addition to the new standard, the EPA now has to consider the specific risks pesticides might have for infants and children. The FQPA required the re-testing of all existing pesticide tolerance levels, of which there were more 9,700, within 10 years. When assessing this risk, the EPA is required to take into account the "aggregate risk" (the exposure to a pesticide from multiple sources) and the "cumulative exposure" to pesticides with similar mechanisms of toxicity. To do this, the EPA is required to establish new science policies to assess the risks. The FQPA requires the EPA to set tolerances for pesticide uses that fall under section 18 of the Federal Insecticide, Fungicide, and Rodenticide Act (emergency exemptions).

==== Cumulative risk assessment ====
The EPA has established guidance for assessing the cumulative risk for multiroute exposures to pesticide groups determined to have a common mechanism of toxicity. The Agency has also published guidance on determining whether chemicals share a common mechanism of toxicity, i.e., whether they can be assessed as a common mechanism group. The risk calculation is based on dose addition, where individual pesticide exposure levels are scaled by their relative potency and then summed. Some key uncertainties in this approach include the possibility that relative potency changes with dose, and the potential for toxicological interactions (dose addition assumes no toxicological interactions). Another caution is that the resulting risk assessments are not complete environmental health evaluations of all chemical exposures, but only represent risks from those common mechanism pesticides.

=== Reduced risk pesticides ===
The FQPA mandates that the EPA expedite the approval of reduced risk pesticides. To be considered reduced risk pesticides must have a proven low-impact on human health, have low toxicity to non-target organisms and have a low potential to contaminate groundwater.

==== Minor uses ====
The FQPA requires the EPA to give special consideration to pesticides used on products that have less than 300,000 acres of total U.S. production or products that do not have enough economic incentive to either support an initial registration or a continuing registration.

=== Public health pesticides ===
The FQPA requires the EPA to establish a list of pests that are considered significant to public health and to give special consideration to pesticides with public health uses. The EPA is also required to provide maintenance fee waivers to and encourage the safe and necessary use of methods/pesticides that either combat or control pests that have been deemed of public health importance. The EPA also provides waiver fees for the pesticides used on pests that are deemed of public health importance.

==== Antimicrobial reform ====
The FQPA mandates the EPA to expedite the review of applications that are requesting the registration of antimicrobial products. The FQPA also exempts certain antimicrobial products from the container provisions in the Federal Insecticide, Fungicide and Rodenticide Act.

==== USDA initiatives ====
The FQPA requires the conduction of food consumption surveys that track food consumption and related behaviors in the U.S. population. The FQPA mandates the collection of pesticide residue and use data. The Pesticide Data Program (PDP) under the Agricultural Marketing Service of the USDA monitors pesticide residue in the nation's food supply to support FQPA. The FQPA mandated the promotion of integrated pest management solutions. PDP also supports FQPA requirements of stricter safety standards and a reassessment of existing pesticide tolerances.

==== Other ====
The FQPA requires that pesticide registration be reviewed periodically, with a goal of once every 15 years. The FQPA mandated changes in the collection of tolerance fees, increasing the amount of fee money from $14 million to $16 million to help with the reassessment of tolerances. The FQPA requires the EPA to specifically screen pesticides for disruption to the endocrine system. The FQPA requires the EPA to establish an integrated pest management education program and implement integrated pest management research and demonstration. The FQPA encourages the syncing of U.S. pesticide tolerances with those of international standards. Under the FQPA individual states are not allowed to set different pesticide tolerances than the EPA and the EPA is required to coordinate data requirements between the state and federal levels. The EPA is required to develop and distribute a food safety brochure and create an annual report on the progress of its registration program.

== Impact ==
The FQPA was the most comprehensive reform of food safety and pesticide laws in decades and posed an implementation challenge for the EPA. Immediately following the passing of the FQPA, the EPA moved to create the Food Safety Advisory Committee. The committee was founded with the intention of fostering an open and public implementation process. Within 10 years, the EPA had successfully reassessed 99% of the nation's pesticide tolerances (recommending the revocation of 3,200, recommending the modification of 1,200 and approving 5,237). In addition to the reassessing of pesticide tolerances, the EPA accommodated the use of special classes of pesticides, addressed the public policy issue of clinical studies to verify pesticide effects, and expedited the availability of safe pesticides.

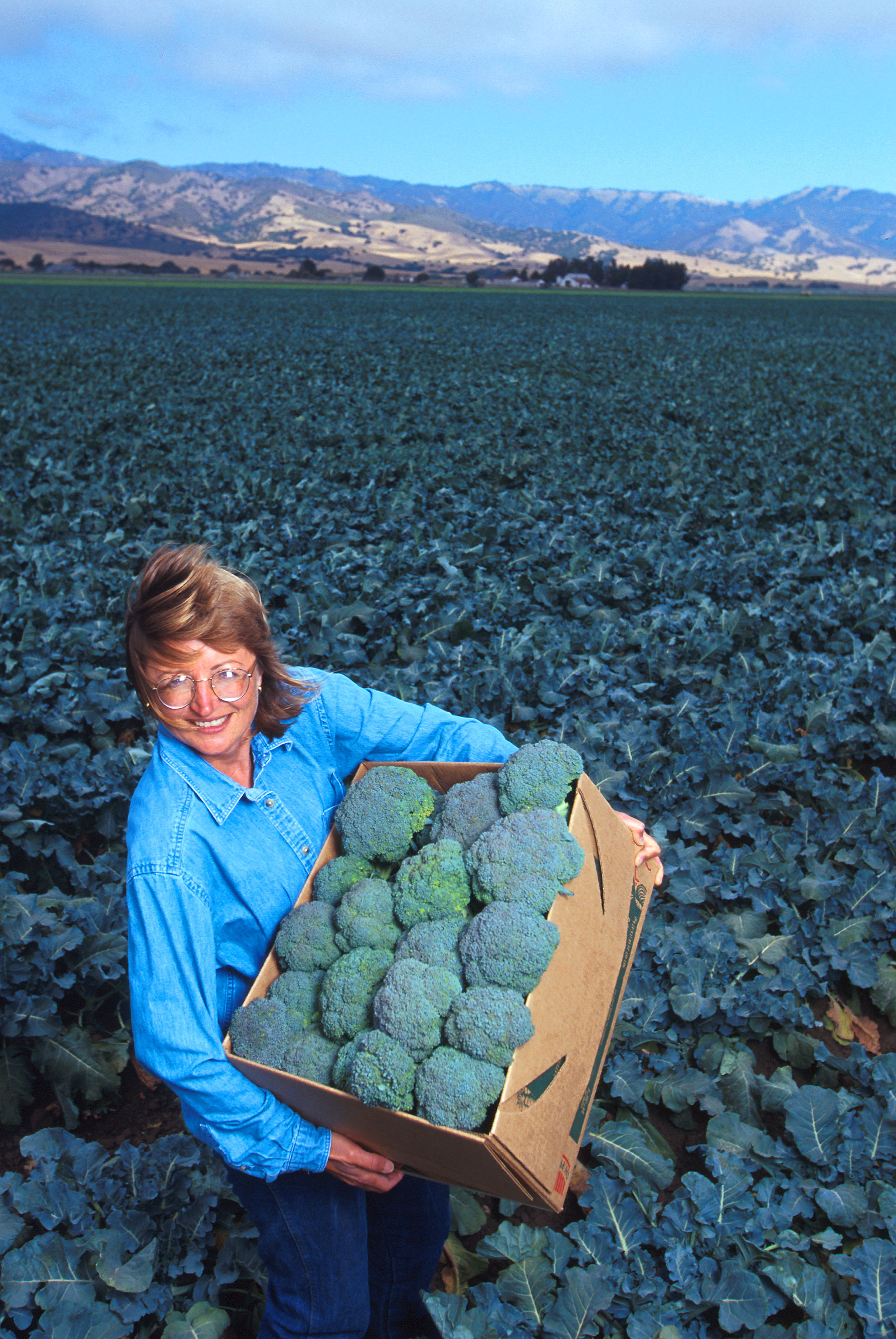
Agronomist Sharon Benzen shows off broccoli grown in a test plot. The crops will be used to help determine appropriate pesticide residue levels.

While the EPA did limit, and in some cases ban, the use of pesticides following the passing of the FQPA, not every stakeholder was pleased with their level of action. Referring to the discrepancies between what constitutes reliable data when determining whether or not to increase the margin of safety tenfold, Richard Weiss (a pesticide expert with the Environmental Working Group) said, "The EPA has failed to comply with the clear intent and requirements of the law". While environmentalists complained, so did farmers. As their ability to harvest quality crops was threatened, farmers said the EPA was unfairly enforcing a "zero risk" instead of a "reasonable certainty of no harm" policy. The EPA responded saying that while they were more stringent after the passing of the FQPA, they were not operating under a no risk/no harm rule.

== Emphasis on children ==
The passing of the FQPA marked the first time the EPA was asked to directly address the risks pesticides pose for infants and children. Because children are smaller, the pesticides they ingest have a proportionately greater impact. The FQPA required the EPA to enforce a safety margin 10 times greater than before if reliable data proving that the pesticide posed no risk for children could not be provided. After the bill's passing, former President Bill Clinton said, "If a pesticide poses a danger to our children, then it won't be in our food".

In 1999, the EPA banned most uses of methyl parathion and azinphos methyl, citing the risks they pose to children. Both methyl parathion and azinphos methyl are organophosphates. Organophosphates are pesticides that kill insects by disrupting nerve impulses. Unfortunately, these pesticides have the same effect on humans. In 2000, the EPA banned another organophosphate, (chlorpyrifos), that was common in the agriculture industry, household cleaners and commercial pest control products, due to a study showing that chlorpyrifos caused weakness, vomiting and diarrhea in baby rats.

The restrictions on these pesticides, although mandated on the premise of child safety, were not received unanimously well by groups outside the EPA. Both agriculture representatives and environmentalists sounded off after the EPA made its decisions. "Chemical Business News" published an article suggesting that the idea that pesticides pose special dangers for children was actually an alarmist issue not based in science. Agriculture lobbies claimed that the banning of organophosphates would cause the agriculture industry an annual loss of $1.8 billion. Environmentalists argued that the EPA was buckling under the pressure of these lobbies and needed to uphold the legal safety standard mandated in the FQPA. In response the EPA published a report saying that they stood by their decisions and the 10 fold safety increase was both conservative and prudent and was only applicable under special circumstances.

== Clinical studies debate ==
In 1998, the EPA placed a moratorium on clinical studies, or human studies, citing both ethical and scientific concerns. While the use of clinical studies for pesticide tolerances had been in decline since the 1980s, the passing of the FQPA re-generated interest in the practice. By testing on humans, pesticide manufacturers could eliminate the additional safety margins required when using data collected from animal testing. Following their moratorium the EPA had the National Academy of Sciences convene a panel of experts to determine the ethical solution to the human studies debate. While the National Academy of Sciences established the panel, both pesticide manufacturers and environmentalists established their own opinions. The Environmental Working Group and the Natural Resources Defense Council argued that clinical studies were both inaccurate and ethically wrong; pesticide manufacturers argued that not only were clinical studies crucial but that they must be allowed to conduct the tests to determine "No observable adverse effects level", meaning they administer the drug until an effect is observed.

The National Academy of Sciences released a report in 2004 supporting the use of clinical studies under strict regulations; the regulations mandated that the study's benefit to society outweigh the risk to the individual, that the study be conducted under a strict ethical code, that there be reasonable certainty that no harm will come to participants and that it has been shown that no other study will work. In 2005, adhering to a congressional directive, the EPA adopted the Human Studies Regulation; the regulations permit human studies, do not allow the use of pregnant women or children in human studies, mandate that a strict ethical code be followed and establish a Human Studies Review Board to oversee the use of human studies. The EPA considers the regulations as a major accomplishment in public policy.

== See also ==
- Federal Food, Drug, and Cosmetic Act
- Food and Drug Administration
- Food quality
- U.S. Environmental Protection Agency
- Federal Insecticide, Fungicide, and Rodenticide Act
