= Title VII =

Title 7 may refer to:

- Title 7 of the United States Code, pertaining to agriculture
- Title 7 of the Code of Federal Regulations, pertaining to agriculture
- Civil Rights Act of 1964 § Title VII – equal employment opportunity
- Title VII of the Patriot Act, increasing the ability of U.S. law enforcement to counter cross-jurisdictional terrorist activity
