= Food and Agriculture Act of 1977 =

United States federal law

- Long title: An Act to provide price and income protection for farmers and assure consumers of an abundance of food and fiber at reasonable prices, and for other purposes.
- Nicknames: 1977 U.S. Farm Bill; Agriculture Act
- Enacted by: the 95th United States Congress
- Effective: September 29, 1977

Citations
- Public law: 95–113
- Statutes at Large: 91 Stat. 913

Codification
- Titles amended: 7 U.S.C.: Agriculture
- U.S.C. sections amended: 7 U.S.C. ch. 35A § 1421

Legislative history
- Introduced in the Senate as S. 275 by Herman Talmadge (D-GA) on January 18, 1977; Committee consideration by Agriculture, Nutrition and Forestry; Passed the Senate on May 24, 1977 (69–18); Passed the House of Representatives as the Agricultural Act of 1977 on July 28, 1977 (294–114); Reported by the joint conference committee on September 9, 1977; agreed to by the Senate on September 9, 1977 (63–8) and by the House of Representatives on September 16, 1977 (283–107); Signed into law by President Jimmy Carter on September 29, 1977

Major amendments
- Agricultural Adjustment Act of 1980

The United States Food and Agriculture Act of 1977 (P.L. 95–113, also known as the 1977 U.S. Farm Bill) was an omnibus farm bill. The S. 275 legislation was passed by the 95th U.S. Congressional session and signed into law by the 39th President of the United States Jimmy Carter on September 29, 1977.

It increased price and income supports and established a farmer-owned reserve for grain. It also established a new two-tiered pricing program for peanuts. Under the peanut program, producers were given an acreage allotment on which a poundage quota was set. Growers could produce in excess of their quota, within their acreage allotment, but would receive the higher of the two price-support levels only for the quota amount. Peanuts in excess of the quota are referred to as "additionals", or additional peanuts.

Title XIII was designated the Food Stamp Act of 1977 and permanently amended the Food Stamp Act of 1964 by eliminating the purchase requirement and simplifying eligibility requirements.

Title XIV was designated the National Agricultural Research, Extension, and Teaching Policy Act and made USDA the leading federal agency for agricultural research, extension, and teaching programs. It also consolidated the funding for these programs.
