= New Breeding Techniques =

Genetic engineering technology

New Breeding Techniques (NBT), also named New Plant Engineering Techniques, are a suite of methods that could increase and accelerate the development of new traits in plant breeding. These new techniques, often involve 'genome editing' whose intention is to modify DNA at specific locations within the plants' genes so that new traits and properties are produced in crop plants.

An ongoing discussion in many countries is as to whether NBTs should be included within the same pre-existing governmental regulations to control genetic modification.

== Methods involved ==
New breeding techniques (NBTs) make specific changes within plant DNA in order to change its traits, and these modifications can vary in scale from altering single base, to inserting or removing one or more genes. The various methods of achieving these changes in traits include the following:

- Cutting and modifying the genome during the repair process (three tools are used to achieve this: Zinc finger nuclease; TALENs, and CRISPR/Cas Tools)
- Genome editing to introduce changes to just a few base pairs (using a technique called 'oligonucleotide-directed mutagenesis' (ODM)).
- Transferring a gene from an identical or closely related species (cisgenesis)
- Adding in a reshuffled set of regulatory instructions from same species (intragenesis)
- Deploying processes that alter gene activity without altering the DNA itself (epigenetic methods)
- Grafting of unaltered plant onto a genetically modified rootstock

== Potential benefits and disbenefits ==
Many European environmental organisations came together in 2016 to jointly express serious concerns over new breeding techniques.

== Regulation ==
=== OECD ===
The Organization for Economic Cooperation and Development (OECD) has its own 'Working Group on Harmonization of Regulatory Oversight in Biotechnology' but, as at 2015, there had been virtually no progress in addressing issues around NBTs, and this includes many major food-producing countries like Russia, South Africa, Brazil, Peru, Mexico, China, Japan and India. Despite its huge potential importance for trade and agriculture, as well as potential risks, the majority of food producing countries in the world at that date still had no policies or protocols for regulating or analysing food products derived specifically from new breeding techniques.

=== South America ===
Argentina introduced regulations and protocols affecting NBTs. These were in place by 2015 and gave clarity to plant developers at an early stage so they could anticipate whether or not their products were likely to be regarded as GMOs. The protocols conform to the internationally recognised 2003 Cartagena Protocol on Biosafety.

=== North America ===
==== United States ====
The United States Department of Agriculture is responsible for determining whether food products derived from NBTs should be regulated, and this is undertaken on a case-by-case manner under the US Plant Protection Act. As of 2015 there was no specific policy towards NBTs, although in the summer of that year the White House announced plans to update the U.S. Regulatory Framework for Biotechnology.

==== Canada ====
Canada's food regulatory system differs from those of most other countries, and its procedures already accommodate products from any breeding technique, including NBTs. This is because its 1993 'Biotechnology Regulatory Framework' is based upon a concept of regulatory triggering based upon "Plants with Novel Traits". In other words, if a new trait does not exist within normal cultivated plant populations in Canada, then no matter how it was developed, it will trigger the normal regulatory processes and testing.

== See also ==
- Genetic engineering in North America
- Synthetic biology
