= Uniform Grain and Rice Storage Agreement =

A Uniform Grain and Rice Storage Agreement (UGRSA) is the contractual arrangement governing transactions between the Agricultural Marketing Service and private grain storage companies. Commercial warehouses storing grain under a nonrecourse loan or owned by the Commodity Credit Corporation (CCC) must have a signed Uniform Grain and Rice Storage Agreement.
