= Agriculture in Austria =

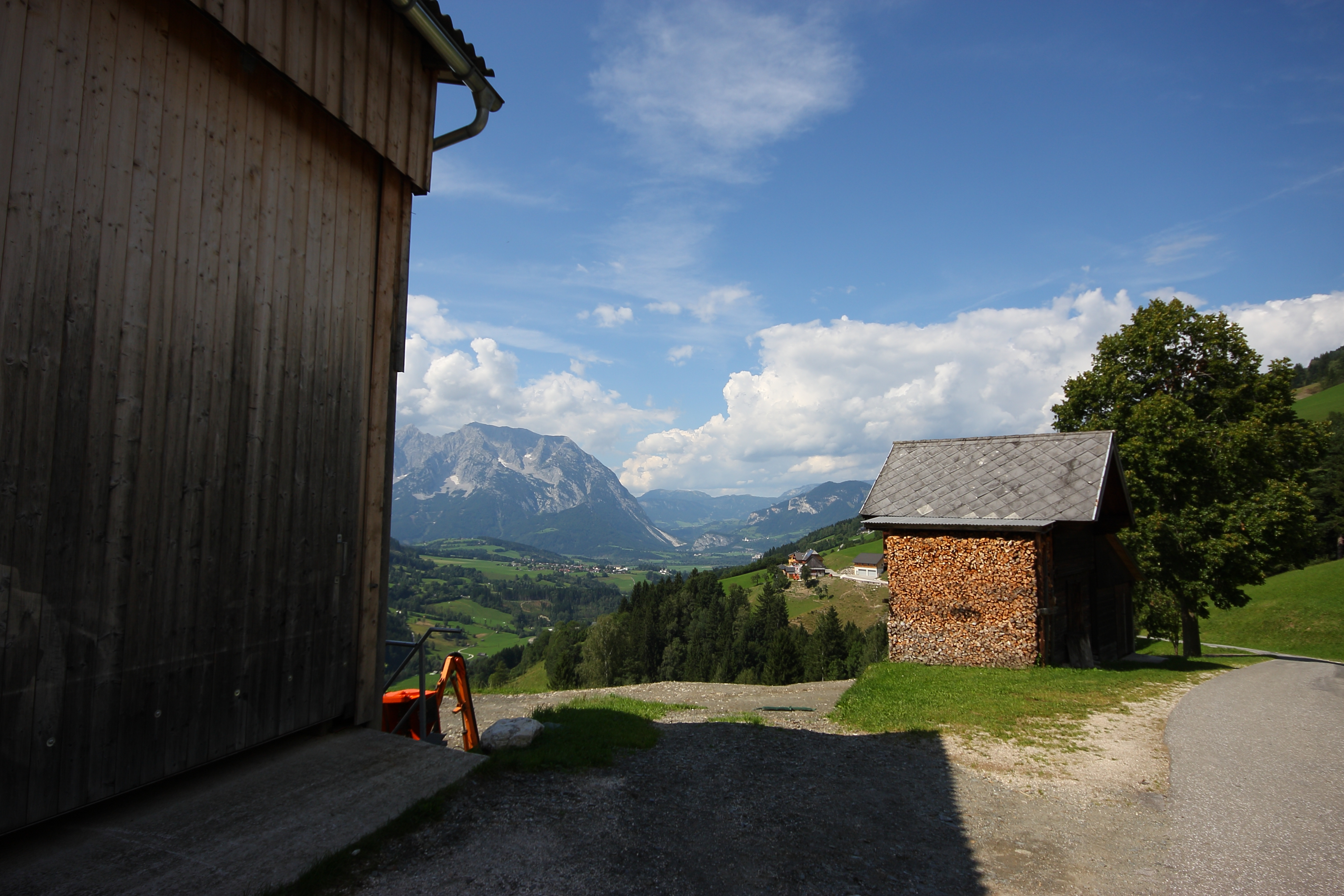
A farm in Austria

The share of agriculture in Austria in the Austrian economy declined steadily after World War II; however, agriculture continues to represent an important element of the economy because of its social and political significance. The Chamber of Agriculture remains on an equal level with the chambers of commerce and labor, although its members produce only a fraction of the GDP that industrial and commercial workers produce.

== Production Value ==
Output value of the agricultural industry 2018–2022 – in million Euro
Item	2018	2019	2020	2021	2022
Cereals	776	802	834	1148	1583
Industrial crops	248	275	304	435	562
Forage plants	517	524	496	562	864
Vegetables	285	346	340	391	442
Plants and flowers	384	372	385	416	436
Potatoes	86	109	93	94	110
Fruits	304	227	294	335	415
Wine	570	498	539	636	687
Other crop products	4	3	2	3	3
CROP OUTPUT	3175	3158	3287	4020	5102
Cattle	834	811	768	826	916
Pigs	721	850	831	774	891
Poultry	205	205	209	222	217
Other animals	54	58	51	66	71
Milk	1369	1356	1395	1470	1904
Eggs	285	289	296	313	399
Other animal products	30	35	35	46	50
ANIMAL OUTPUT	3507	3604	3585	3718	4447
AGRICULTURAL SERVICES OUTPUT	322	322	341	348	415
NON AGRICULTURAL SECONDARY ACTIVITIES	439	452	448	498	580
OUTPUT OF THE AGRICULTURAL INDUSTRY	7443	7535	7661	8584	10545

== Government role ==
In Austria, as in most other eastern countries, the government has played an important role in agriculture since the end of World War II. The government has concentrated on mitigating social, regional, economic, and even environmental consequences of the sector's decline, as well as delaying the decline itself.

Agricultural policy has been carried out with different objectives and with different laws and policies depending on the times. at the early post-war years, the most important objectives were survival and self-sufficiency. As a poor country, Austria needed to be able to feed itself if its population was to survive.

By the 1950s, however, the policy was changing to a more global perspective, while keeping intact the traditional farm economy. The government wanted to protect domestic production, stabilize agricultural markets, protect farmers' incomes, and improve the sector's ability to compete in Austria and abroad. Increasingly, the government began to believe in the importance of maintaining rural society as an objective in its own right, for social reasons, and to protect the environment and encourage tourism. Because of these aims, agricultural policy, more than any other economic policy, reflects a mixture of economic and noneconomic objectives and concerns. The principal aim, however, is to preserve the existing number of farms as much as possible.

Within the structure of the social partnership, various organizations work to maintain farm incomes and thus farm existence, among them the Grain Board, the Dairy Board, and the Livestock and Meat Commission. These organizations set basic support prices, taking into account domestic costs and local supply and demand, with only weak linkages to world market prices.

The boards and commission use a variety of measures to achieve their broad purposes. Among these measures are import restrictions, such as border controls and entry controls—some of which may be bilaterally negotiated—and variable import duties. If import restrictions are not sufficient to maintain prices because of excess production, the surplus is exported at subsidized prices (with the subsidies usually coming from federal or provincial authorities). Authorities also apply production controls, such as sales quotas or limits, on the size and density of livestock holdings. Quotas exist for many different products, with the quotas usually fixed on the basis of past production. Price and quality controls and limits also exist, especially with respect to different prices for different grades of wheat or milk. The government can also pay direct income supplements, but these payments are generally restricted to certain mountain farming zones and other equally disadvantaged areas. Subsidies are mainly paid by the federal government but may in some instances be paid by provincial governments.

Because of the complex system of price supports and market access limitations, the exact share of subsidy costs to the government and to consumers is virtually impossible to calculate. Experts estimate that the total cost to the federal and other governments for agricultural and forestry support during the late 1980s was approximately S16 billion a year, a level that would have been roughly at the same level as that of many other Organisation for Economic Co-operation and Development (OECD) governments but slightly higher than the EC average.

The economic research institute Österreichisches Institut für Wirtschaftsforschung (WIFO) estimated after a major 1989 study that about 71 percent of the cost of agricultural support was borne by consumers in the form of higher prices, with the taxpayers carrying the remaining 29 percent through such different programs as direct and indirect federal and provincial subsidies or various kinds of market regulation.

== Structure of agriculture ==
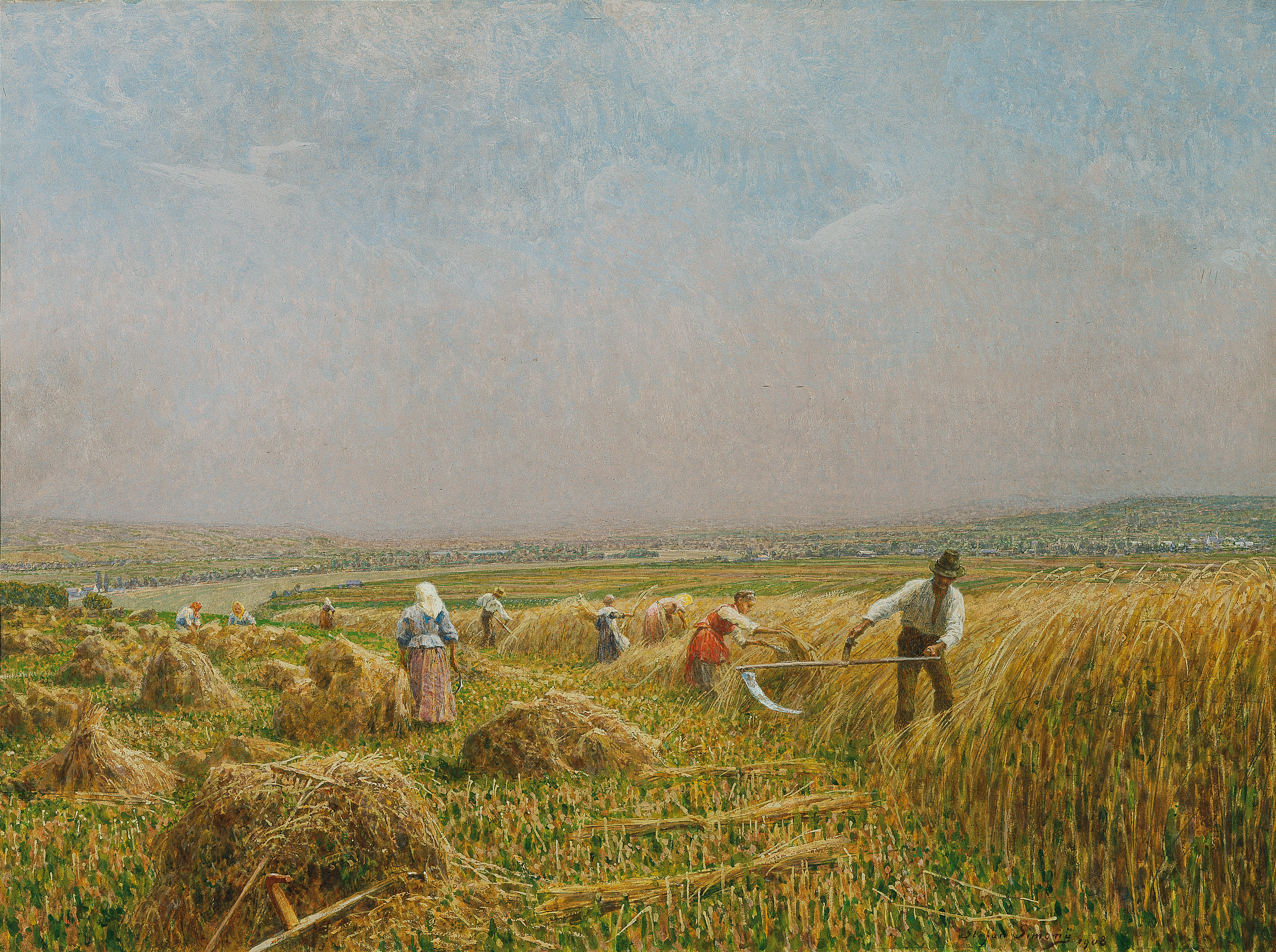
Harvest in Austria in the early 20th century

Despite the government's efforts to sustain agriculture, not one province had as much as 10 percent of the population involved in agriculture and forestry by 1991. At the beginning of the 1970s, all but two provinces (Vienna and Vorarlberg) had more than 10 percent of their populations involved in farming. This contrasted markedly to the situation in 1934, when all but those same two provinces had more than 30 percent of their populations working in agriculture. Over this period of two generations, the decline in the Austrian farm population was as fast as any in the Western world.

As of the early 1990s, of Austria's total area of almost 84,000 square kilometers, about 67,000 square kilometers was used for farming and forestry. Roughly half of that area was forest, and the remainder was arable land and pasture.

Agriculture and forestry accounted for about 280,000 enterprises in 1986, with the average holding being about twenty-three hectares. There were about 4,500 corporate farms. Beyond those farms, however, only a third of all farmers were full-time farmers or farming companies. Over half the farming enterprises were smaller than ten hectares; nearly 40 percent were smaller than five hectares. Just as the number of farmers has long been in decline, so also has been the number of farms.

Family labor predominates, especially in mountainous areas and on smaller farms. Only a third of all farm and forestry enterprises were classified as full-time occupations in 1986. A full half of these enterprises are spare-time, that is, less than half of household labor is devoted to farming or forestry. The remainder are part-time. Farms up to ten hectares are more often tended by part-time and spare-time farmers rather than by full-time farmers. For most farm owners and workers, nonfarm income is as important, if not more important, than farm income.

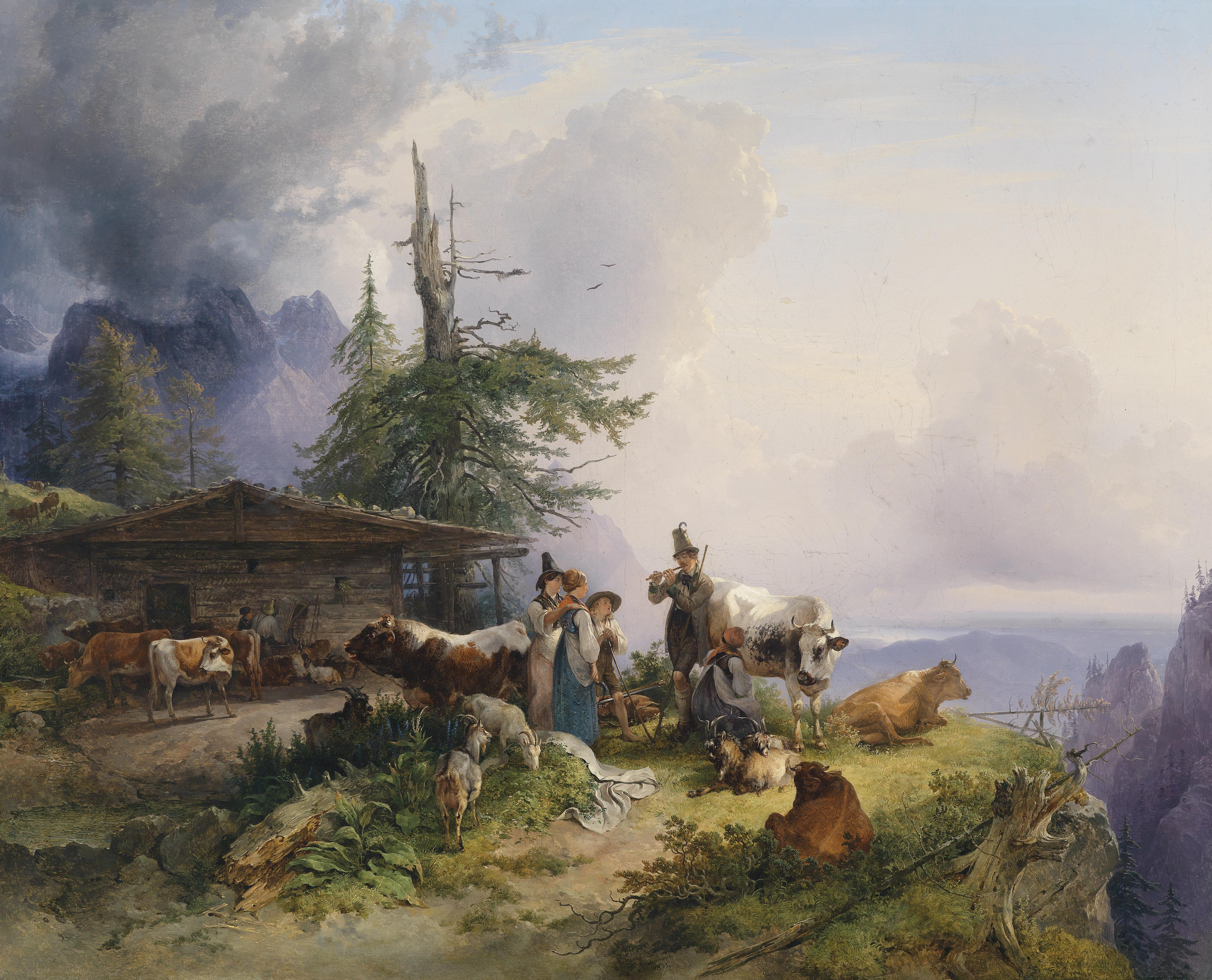
Animal husbandry in the Alps in the 19th century

Despite the decline in the number of farmers and agriculture's share of GDP since 1960, agricultural output has risen. As of the early 1990s, Austria was self-sufficient in all cereals and milk products as well as in red meat. This gain was achieved because of the considerable gains in agricultural labor productivity.

The value of agricultural and forestry output is heavily concentrated in field crops, meat, and dairy products, with most of it coming from animal husbandry. Because large parts of Austria are mountainous, only the lowland areas of eastern Austria and some smaller flat portions of western and northern Austria are suitable for crop production and more intensive forms of animal husbandry. The remainder of the land is used for forestry and less intensive animal husbandry, most of which takes advantage of mountain pasturage.
