= Genetically modified food in North America =

Genetic engineering in North America is any genetic engineering activities in North America

As of 2002 the United States, Canada, and Mexico do not require labeling of genetically modified foods.

== Canada ==
Mainland Canada is one of the world's largest producers of GM canola and also grows GM maize, soybean and sugarbeet. Health Canada, under the Food and Drugs Act, and the Canadian Food Inspection Agency are responsible for evaluating the safety and nutritional value of genetically modified foods. Environmental assessments of biotechnology-derived plants are carried out by the CFIA's Plant Biosafety Office (PBO). The Canadian regulatory system is based on whether a product has novel features regardless of method of origin. In other words, a product is regulated as GM if it carries some trait not previously found in the species whether it was generated using traditional breeding methods (e.g. selective breeding, cell fusion, mutation breeding) or genetic engineering. Canadian law requires that manufacturers and importers submit detailed scientific data to Health Canada for safety assessments for approval. This data includes: information on how the GM plant was developed; nucleic acid data that characterizes the genetic change; composition and nutritional data of the novel food compared to the original non-modified food' potential for new toxins; and potential for being an allergen. A decision is then made whether to approve the product for release along with any restrictions or requirements. Labeling of foods as products of Genetic Engineering or not products of Genetic Engineering is voluntary. The Canadian regulations were reviewed by the Canadian Biotechnology Advisory Committee between 1999 and 2003, with the conclusion that the current level of regulation was satisfactory. The committee was accused by environmental and citizen groups of not representing the full spectrum of public interests by only having one member of the board of 20 representing non-governmental organisations and for being too closely aligned to industry groups.

== Mexico ==
In February 2005, after consulting the Mexican Academy of Sciences, Mexico's senate passed a law allowing to plant and sell genetically modified cotton and soybean. The law requires all genetically modified products to be labelled according to guidelines issued by the Mexican Ministry of Health. In 2009, the government enacted statutory provisions for the regulation of genetically modified maize. Mexico is the center of diversity for maize and concerns had been raised about the impact genetically modified maize could have on local strains. In 2013, a federal judge ordered Mexico's SAGARPA (Secretaría de Agricultura, Ganadería, Desarrollo Rural, Pesca, y Alimentación), which is Mexico's Secretary of Agriculture, and SEMARNAT (Secretaría de Medio Ambiente y Recursos Naturales), equivalent of the EPA, to temporarily halt any new GMO corn permits, accepting a lawsuit brought by opponents of the crop.

== United States ==
=== Federal regulation ===
The USA is the largest commercial grower of genetically modified crops in the world.

United States regulatory policy is governed by the Coordinated Framework for Regulation of Biotechnology This regulatory policy framework that was developed under the Presidency of Ronald Reagan to ensure safety of the public and to ensure the continuing development of the fledgling biotechnology industry without overly burdensome regulation. The policy as it developed had three tenets: "(1) U.S. policy would focus on the product of genetic modification (GM) techniques, not the process itself, (2) only regulation grounded in verifiable scientific risks would be tolerated, and (3) GM products are on a continuum with existing products and, therefore, existing statutes are sufficient to review the products." In 2015 the Obama administration announced that it would update the way the government regulated genetically modified crops.

For a genetically modified organism to be approved for release, it must be assessed under the Plant Protection Act by the Animal and Plant Health Inspection Service (APHIS) agency within the US Department of Agriculture (USDA) and may also be assessed by the Food and Drug Administration (FDA) and the Environmental Protection Agency (EPA), depending on the intended use of the organism. The USDA evaluates the plant's potential to become a weed. The FDA has a voluntary consultation process with the developers of genetically engineered plants. The Federal Food, Drug, and Cosmetic Act, which outlines FDA's responsibilities, does not require pre-market clearance of food, including genetically modified food plants. The EPA regulates genetically modified plants with pesticide properties, as well as agrochemical residues. Most genetically modified plants are reviewed by at least two of the agencies, with many subject to all three. Within the organization are departments that regulate different areas of GM food including, the Center for Food Safety and Applied Nutrition (CFSAN, ) and the Center for Biologics Evaluation and Research (CBER). As of 2008, all developers of genetically modified crops in the US had made use of the voluntary process. Final approval can still be denied by individual counties within each state. In 2004, Mendocino County, California became the first county to impose a ban on the "Propagation, Cultivation, Raising, and Growing of Genetically Modified Organisms", the measure passing with a 57% majority. In May, 2014 Jackson and Josephine Counties in Southern Oregon passed initiatives similar to that passed by Mendocino County; both passing by 2 to 1 margins.

Several laws govern the US regulatory agencies. These laws are statutes the agencies review when determining the safety of a particular GM food. These laws include:

- The Federal Insecticide, Fungicide, and Rodenticide Act (FIFRA) (EPA);
- The Toxic Substances Control Act (TSCA) (EPA);
- The Federal Food, Drug, and Cosmetic Act (FFDCA) (FDA and EPA);
- The Plant Protection Act (PPA) (USDA);
- The Virus-Serum-Toxin Act (VSTA) (USDA);
- The Public Health Service Act (PHSA)(FDA);
- The Dietary Supplement Health and Education Act (DSHEA) (FDA)
- The Meat Inspection Act (MIA)(USDA);
- The Poultry Products Inspection Act (PPIA) (USDA);
- The Egg Products Inspection Act (EPIA) (USDA); and
- The National Environmental Policy Act (NEPA).

=== State regulation ===
Several states have passed regulations concerning labelling of GM food; Connecticut passed a GMO labeling bill in May 2013, but the bill will only be triggered after four other states enact similar legislation. On January 9, 2014, Maine’s governor signed a bill requiring labeling for foods made with GMO's, with a similar triggering mechanism as Connecticut's bill. In May 2014 Vermont passed a law requiring labeling of food containing ingredients derived from genetically modified organisms. A federal judge ruled Maui's GMO ban invalid.
