= Cotton Incorporated =

American non-profit organization

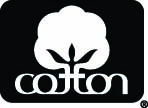
- Company type: Trade organization
- Industry: Brand marketing & brand management
- Founded: 1970
- Headquarters: Cary, North Carolina, U.S.
- Website: www.cottoninc.com

Cotton Incorporated is a not-for-profit organization funded by cotton growers in the United States through per-bale assessments on producers and importers levied by the Cotton Board, which reports to the United States Department of Agriculture.

The Cotton Research and Promotion Act of 1966 enabled the establishment of Cotton Incorporated in 1970. The organization conducts research and promotes the use of cotton, including initial processing, recycling, and marketing. The company has helped cotton increase market share in fabrics since it was enacted, both through the branding of cotton with the "Seal of Cotton" and improved technology. The successful campaign was the first commodity brand.

Cotton Incorporated's world headquarters are located in Cary, North Carolina, and offices are located in New York, Mexico City, Hong Kong, Shanghai, and Osaka. Cotton Incorporated works with the Cotton Council International.

On Thanksgiving Day, 1989, Cotton Incorporated launched its long-running "Fabric of Our Lives" advertising campaign, featuring the song "Fabric Of Our Lives" written by Zack Smith and performed by Richie Havens.
