= Section 22 =

Section 22 may refer to:

- Section 22 of the Agricultural Adjustment Act, a United States agricultural law
- Section 22 of the Canadian Charter of Rights and Freedoms
- Section 22 of the Constitution of Australia
- Section 22 of the Indian Penal Code, definition of "movable property"
