= Cotton Board =

Cotton Board may refer to the following organisations promoting the cotton industry:

- Cotton Board (United Kingdom), Manchester, United Kingdom
- Cotton Board (United States), Memphis, Tennessee, United States
