= USWA =

USWA can refer to:

- The United States Wrestling Association, a former professional wrestling promotion
- The United Steelworkers of America, a labor union.
- The United States Warehouse Act of 1916, a United States Act of Congress.
