= Federal Seed Act =

- Long title: An Act to regulate interstate and foreign commerce in seeds; to require labeling and to prevent misrepresentation of seeds in interstate commerce; to require certain standards with respect to certain imported seeds; and for other purposes.
- Acronyms (colloquial): FSA
- Nicknames: Federal Seed Act of 1939
- Enacted by: the 76th United States Congress
- Effective: February 4, 1940

Citations
- Public law: Pub. L. 76–354
- Statutes at Large: 53 Stat. 1275

Codification
- Titles amended: 7 U.S.C.: Agriculture
- U.S.C. sections created: 7 U.S.C. ch. 37 § 1551 et seq.

Legislative history
- Introduced in the House as H.R. 5625 by Harry B. Coffee (D-NE) on May 3, 1939; Committee consideration by House Agriculture, Senate Agriculture & Forestry; Passed the House on June 7, 1939 (Passed); Passed the Senate on August 1, 1939 (Passed) with amendment; House agreed to Senate amendment on August 3, 1939 (Agreed); Signed into law by President Franklin D. Roosevelt on August 9, 1939

The Federal Seed Act, P.L. 76-354 (August 9, 1939), requires accurate labeling and purity standards for seeds in commerce, and prohibits the importation and movement of adulterated or misbranded seeds. The law works in conjunction with the Plant Protection Act of 2000 to authorize the Animal and Plant Health Inspection Service (APHIS) to regulate the importation of field crop, pasture and forage, or vegetable seed that may contain noxious weed seeds. USDA's Agricultural Marketing Service is responsible for enforcing the labeling and purity standard provisions.

== Titles of the Act ==
Title 7 Chapter 37 was authored as four titles establishing agricultural policy for the specifications of forage and vegetable seeds.

Title I - Definitions - 7 U.S.C. §§ 1561-1562

Construction with respect to labeling for variety and origin
Agricultural seeds
Vegetable seeds
Weed seeds
Noxious weed seeds
Origin, kind, variety, and type of seeds
Germination
Hard seeds
Pure live seed
Label and labeling of seeds
Advertisement
Subject to prescribed tolerances
False labeling and false advertisement
Screenings
In bulk

Title II - Interstate Commerce - 7 U.S.C. §§ 1571-1575

Prohibitions Relating to Interstate Commerce in Certain Seeds
Records
Exemptions
Disclaimers and Nonwarranties
False Advertising

Title III - Foreign Commerce - 7 U.S.C. §§ 1581-1586

Prohibitions and Procedures Relating to Importations
Adulterated Seed
Seed Unfit for Seeding Purposes
Certain Seeds Required to be Stained
Certain Acts Prohibited

Title IV - General Provisions - 7 U.S.C. §§ 1591-1610

Delegation of Duties
Rules and Regulations
Standards, Tests, and Tolerances
Prohibition Against Alterations
Seizure
Penalties
Cease and Desist Proceedings
Separability of Proceedings
Publication
Authorization for Appropriations
Authorization for Expenditures
Cooperation
Separability of Provisions
Repeals
Effective Date

== Amendments to 1939 Act ==
U.S. Statutes related to Amendments and Federal Seed Act of 1939

Date of Enactment	Public Law No.	U.S. Statute	U.S. Bill No.	U.S. Presidential Administration
July 9, 1956	P.L. 84-662	70 Stat. 508	S. 1688	Dwight D. Eisenhower
August 1, 1958	P.L. 85-581	72 Stat. 476	S. 1939	Dwight D. Eisenhower
October 15, 1966	P.L. 89-686	80 Stat. 975	H.R. 15662	Lyndon B. Johnson
October 17, 1969	P.L. 91-89	83 Stat. 134	S. 1836	Richard M. Nixon
January 8, 1983	P.L. 97-439	96 Stat. 2287	H.R. 7005	Ronald W. Reagan

== See also ==
- Plant Disease Bulletin
- Seed bank
