= Noxious =

Noxious describes any happening that is perceived as harmful. It may also refer to:

- Poison, substances that can harm or kill
- Noxious weed, a plant designated by the government as injurious to public health, agriculture, recreation, wildlife or property
- Noxious stimulus, an actually or potentially tissue damaging event, may be mechanical, chemical or thermal
- Federal Noxious Weed Act of 1974, a United States law that established a federal program to control the spread of noxious weeds
