= Agricultural Adjustment Act of 1980 =

- Other short titles: Agriculture Adjustment Act of 1979
- Long title: An Act to adjust target prices for the 1980 and 1981 crops of wheat and feed grains; to extend the disaster payment programs for the 1980 crops of wheat, feed grains, upland cotton, and rice; and to authorize the Secretary of Agriculture to require that producers of wheat, feed grains, upland cotton, and rice not exceed the normal crop acreage for the 1980 and 1981 crops.
- Enacted by: the 96th United States Congress
- Effective: March 18, 1980

Citations
- Public law: 96-213
- Statutes at Large: 94 Stat. 119

Codification
- Acts amended: Food and Agriculture Act of 1977
- Titles amended: 7 U.S.C.: Agriculture
- U.S.C. sections amended: 7 U.S.C. ch. 35A § 1421

Legislative history
- Introduced in the House as H.R. 3398 by Glenn English (D–OK) on April 3, 1979; Committee consideration by House Agriculture, House Appropriations, Senate Agriculture, Nutrition, and Forestry; Passed the House on November 8, 1979 (passed/agreed); Passed the Senate on December 20, 1979 (passed/agreed); Reported by the joint conference committee on February 28, 1980; agreed to by the House on March 4, 1980 (agreed) and by the Senate on March 4, 1980 (agreed); Signed into law by President Jimmy Carter on March 18, 1980

The Agricultural Adjustment Act of 1980 (P.L. 96-213) amended the Food and Agriculture Act of 1977 (P.L. 95–113), primarily to raise the target prices for wheat and corn.

The H.R. 3398 legislation was passed by the 96th U.S. Congressional session and signed into law by the 39th President of the United States Jimmy Carter on March 18, 1980.
