= Beef Export Verification Program =

The United States Department of Agriculture’s Agricultural Marketing Service (AMS) initiated the Beef Export Verification (BEV) Program in August 2003 as a voluntary, user-fee funded service. Under BEV, U.S. exporters desiring to sell beef to Japan (or any other country that may request similar documentation) can apply for BEV certification from AMS after satisfying a list of requirements enabling the agency to verify the origin of the beef. The program was in response to Japanese officials’ demands that the United States verify that none its beef exports were of Canadian origin, in the wake of the May 2003 discovery in Canada of a cow with bovine spongiform encephalopathy (BSE). After the December 2003 discovery of a BSE cow in the United States, Japan was among the first of the many countries to suspend some or all imports of U.S. cattle, beef and related products, so the future of BEV was clouded.
