= National Pesticide Information Center =

The National Pesticide Information Center (NPIC) is a collaboration between Oregon State University and the United States Environmental Protection Agency to provide objective, science-based information about pesticides, the recognition and management of pesticide poisonings, toxicology and environmental chemistry. It is funded through a cooperative agreement that is competitively awarded to an eligible applicant every 3–5 years. It was previously known as the National Pesticide Telecommunication Network.

== History ==
The program was first established in 1978 as a toll free telephone service at the Texas Tech University Health Sciences Center to assist medical professionals with the recognition and management of pesticide poisonings. The service was later expanded to the general public.

In the mid 1980s the NPIC moved to Texas Tech University and became the National Pesticide Telecommunications Network. In 1995 the program was moved to Oregon State University (OSU) and the name was later changed to the National Pesticide Information Center in 2001.

== Highlights ==
- In 2012, NPIC developed an Insect Repellent Locator Mobile App.
- In 2013, NPIC developed several web Apps including: Mobile Access to Pesticides and Labels (MAPL), Pesticide Education & Search Tool (PEST), and Pesticide and Local Services (PALS).

== Incident Reporting ==
The National Pesticide Information Center does not have regulatory authority in relation to pesticides. Pesticide regulatory agencies in many states are delegated primary enforcement responsibilities for pesticide violations by the United States Environmental Protection Agency. However, in addition to being reported to state regulators, pesticide incidents involving people, pets, wildlife (including bees), or the environment can be reported to the NPIC.

Incident reports collected by the NPIC, which exclude personally identifiable information, are provided to the U.S. EPA through scheduled reporting and by request from U.S. EPA and partner agencies. A veterinary incident reporting portal is also available to professional veterinary staff seeking to report a pesticide incident involving an animal.

== See also ==
- Pesticide Data Program
- Pesticide Action Network
