= Agricultural Adjustment Act Amendment of 1935 =

United States federal law

- Other short titles: Potato Control Act of 1935
- Long title: An Act to amend the Agricultural Adjustment Act, and for other purposes.
- Enacted by: the 74th United States Congress
- Effective: August 24, 1935

Citations
- Public law: 74-320
- Statutes at Large: 49 Stat. 750

Codification
- Titles amended: 7 U.S.C.: Agriculture
- U.S.C. sections created: 7 U.S.C. ch. 29 §§ 801-833
- U.S.C. sections amended: 7 U.S.C. ch. 26, subch. I § 602; 7 U.S.C. ch. 26, subch. II §§ 604, 606, 607; 7 U.S.C. ch. 26, subch. III §§ 608, 608a, 608b, 608c, 608d, 608e, 608f, 609, 610, 611, 612, 612a, 612b, 612c, 612c–6, 613, 615, 616, 617, 619, 624

Legislative history
- Introduced in the House as H.R. 8492 by John M. Jones (D–TX) on June 15, 1935; Committee consideration by House Agriculture, Senate Agriculture and Forestry; Passed the House on June 18, 1935 (Passed); Passed the Senate on July 23, 1935 (64-15); Reported by the joint conference committee on July 30, 1935; agreed to by the House on August 13, 1935 (Agreed) and by the Senate on August 15, 1935 (Agreed); Signed into law by President Franklin D. Roosevelt on August 24, 1935

In United States federal agriculture legislation, the Agricultural Adjustment Act Amendment of 1935 (P.L. 74-320) made several important and lasting changes to the Agricultural Adjustment Act of 1933 (P.L. 73-10). Franklin D. Roosevelt signed the Act into law on August 24, 1935.

Section 22 of the law gave the President authority to impose quotas when imports interfered with commodity programs designed to raise prices and farm income. Section 32 was designed to widen market outlets for surplus agricultural commodities by permanently appropriating funds (30% of annual gross customs receipts) to promote food consumption, reduce agricultural surpluses, and provide for the food needs of low income populations. Section 32 funds are used by the Secretary to purchase surplus commodities for donation outside normal channels of trade (e.g., to school lunch programs), and to support the costs of child nutrition programs. Section 22 has been superseded, but Section 32 continues to operate and is used primarily for child nutrition programs. In 1936, this act was declared unconstitutional and was therefore only a short-term benefit to farmers.

== See also ==
Potato Control Law
Resettlement Administration
