= Fluid Milk Promotion Act of 1990 =

The Fluid Milk Promotion Act of 1990 the designation given to Subtitle H of Title XIX of the Food, Agriculture, Conservation, and Trade Act of 1990 (P.L. 101-624). Subtitle H authorized the establishment of a national fluid milk processor promotion program, or commodity checkoff program for fluid milk promotion. The program is funded through a 20¢/cwt. assessment on all milk processed for fluid consumption.

The Act required the United States Department of Agriculture (USDA) to conduct a referendum among fluid milk processors to determine if a majority favored implementing the program. The Fluid Milk Order was approved by processors and became effective December 10, 1993. The program originally required periodic congressional reauthorization. However, the 2002 farm bill (P.L. 107-171, Sec. 1506) gave the program permanent authority.
