= United States Grain Standards Act of 1916 =

United States federal law

Grain Standards Act of 1916
- Other short titles: Agricultural Appropriations Act of 1917; Cotton Futures Act of 1916; Cotton Futures Amendments; Grain Grades Amendment
- Long title: An Act making appropriations for the Department of Agriculture for the fiscal year ending June thirtieth, nineteen hundred and seventeen, and for other purposes.
- Enacted by: the 64th United States Congress
- Effective: August 11, 1916

Citations
- Public law: 64-190
- Statutes at Large: 39 Stat. 482

Codification
- Titles amended: 7 U.S.C.: Agriculture
- U.S.C. sections created: 7 U.S.C. ch. 3 § 71 et seq.

Legislative history
- Introduced in the House as H.R. 12717; Committee consideration by House Agriculture Committee, Senate Agriculture and Forestry Committee; Passed the House on April 28, 1916 (184-136); Passed the Senate on July 5, 1916 (30-28); Reported by the joint conference committee on August 3, 1916; agreed to by the House on August 3, 1916 (Passed) and by the Senate on August 3, 1916 (34-25); Signed into law by President Woodrow Wilson on August 11, 1916

The United States Grain Standards Act (USGSA) of 1916 (P.L. 64-190), as amended (7 U.S.C. 71 et seq.), authorizes the Grain Inspection, Packers and Stockyards Administration to establish official marketing standards (not health and safety standards) for grains and oilseeds, and requires that exported grains and oilseeds be officially weighed and inspected. Domestically marketed grain and oilseeds may be, but are not required to be, officially inspected. Export inspections are carried out by federal inspectors or by federally supervised state inspection agencies, called delegated official inspection agencies. Official inspections of domestically traded grain is done by federally supervised state agencies and private companies, called designated official inspection agencies. Typically, marketing standards describe the physical characteristics (such as weight, damaged kernels, foreign material, shrunken and broken kernels, and defects) of the commodity and serve as contract language to facilitate marketing. Official weighing and inspection is paid for on a fee-for service basis, not with federal funds. Major changes to the law were adopted in the USGSA Amendments of 1968, the USGSA of 1976 (P.L. 94-582), and the Grain Quality Improvement Act of 1986 (P.L. 99-641).

The act required official certification that export grain sold by grade had been inspected and weighed. It also provided for the establishment of official U.S. grain standards that were used to measure and describe the physical and biological properties of the grain at the time of inspection. It was the culmination of 25 years of investigation, public hearings, and debate. The rapid expansion of the U.S. grain industry created a need for a uniform system of grading in order to better facilitate trade. Independent attempts by local Chambers of Commerce, boards of trade, and major grain corporations to develop standards had resulted in inequalities among markets, emphasizing the need for Federal legislation to reduce the confusion and corruption that characterized the trade. As a result, the Department of Agriculture over time had established laboratory tests and conducted numerous interviews and hearings to identify the most urgent needs of the grain industry. The information became the basis for the legislation that was finally adopted. In Dec. 1914 and Jan. 1915, the House Agriculture Committee tossed around an early version of the bill called the "Moss Grain Grades Bill" sponsored by Rep. Hunter H. Moss Jr. (D) of West Virginia, but did not act on it because of exporting companies' pressure. The political situation had changed, however, as the election of 1916 approached.
