= Cotton Board (United States) =

The Cotton Board is the oversight and administrative arm of the Cotton Research and Promotion Program. The Cotton Board is based in Memphis, Tennessee, and represents American upland cotton. It is the commodity checkoff organization for the American cotton industry. The board administers Cotton Incorporated, its research and marketing entity, which is responsible for the longstanding "The Fabric of Our Lives" campaign.

The board is a quasi-public entity established in 7 USC 53 and 7 CFR 1205. It is funded through assessments on US cotton producers and importers, including importers of most cotton-derived goods; the assessment is waived if the imported goods were made from previously-exported US cotton.

In 2018, the Cotton Board collected $88.1 million in assessments, $38.5 million of which were from cotton and cotton article importers. Its 2018 assets stood at $120.5 million, of which $68.2 million were immediately liquid, with $25 million in long-term investments.
