= Farm Labor Contractor Registration Act =

- Long title: An Act to provide for the registration of contractors of migrant agricultural workers, and for other purposes.
- Nicknames: Farm Labor Contractor Registration Act of 1963
- Enacted by: the 88th United States Congress
- Effective: January 1, 1965

Citations
- Public law: 88-582
- Statutes at Large: 78 Stat. 920

Codification
- Titles amended: 7 U.S.C.: Agriculture
- U.S.C. sections created: 7 U.S.C. ch. 52 § 2041 et seq.

Legislative history
- Introduced in the Senate as S. 524 by Harrison A. Williams (D-NJ) on May 27, 1963; Committee consideration by Senate Labor and Public Welfare, House Education and Labor; Passed the Senate on June 11, 1963 (Passed voice vote); Passed the House on August 17, 1964 (343-7, in lieu of H.R. 6242) with amendment; Senate agreed to House amendment on August 21, 1964 (Agreed voice vote); Signed into law by President Lyndon B. Johnson on September 7, 1964

The Farm Labor Contractor Registration Act (FLCRA) — P.L. 88-582 (September 7, 1964, as amended) — regulated the activities of farm labor contractors, that is, agents who recruit and are otherwise engaged in the transport, housing, and employment of migratory agricultural workers. Under FLCRA, farm labor contractors were required to secure certification through the United States Department of Labor.

Strengthened by amendment in 1974, the Act became a target of growing criticism and, in 1983, was repealed and replaced with the Migrant and Seasonal Agricultural Workers Protection Act (P.L. 97-470).

== Amendment to 1963 Act ==
U.S. Congressional amendment to the Farm Labor Contractor Registration Act of 1963.

Date of Enactment	Public Law Number	U.S. Statute Citation	U.S. Legislative Bill	U.S. Presidential Administration
December 9, 1974	P.L. 93-518	88 Stat. 1652	S. 3202	Gerald R. Ford
