= Potato Control Law =

Act of the US Congress

- Other short titles: Agricultural Adjustment Act Amendment of 1935
- Long title: An Act to amend the Agricultural Adjustment Act, and for other purposes.
- Nicknames: Potato Control Act of 1935
- Enacted by: the 74th United States Congress
- Effective: August 24, 1935

Citations
- Public law: 74-320
- Statutes at Large: 49 Stat. 774 aka 49 Stat. 782

Codification
- Titles amended: 7 U.S.C.: Agriculture
- U.S.C. sections created: 7 U.S.C. ch. 29 §§ 801-833

Legislative history
- Introduced in the House as H.R. 8492 by John M. Jones (D–TX) on June 15, 1935; Committee consideration by House Agriculture, Senate Agriculture and Forestry; Passed the House on June 18, 1935 (Passed); Passed the Senate on July 23, 1935 (64-15); Reported by the joint conference committee on July 30, 1935; agreed to by the House on August 13, 1935 (Agreed) and by the Senate on August 15, 1935 (Agreed); Signed into law by President Franklin D. Roosevelt on August 24, 1935

The Potato Control Law (1929) was based upon an economic policy enacted by U.S. President Herbert Hoover's Federal Emergency Relief Administration at the beginning of the Great Depression. The policy became a formal act in 1935, and its legislative sponsors were from the state of North Carolina. Hoover's presidential successor, Franklin D. Roosevelt, signed the Act into law on August 24, 1935.

The law was enforced by the Agricultural Adjustment Administration (AAA) to protect about 30,000 farmers who made their main living growing potatoes, and who feared that the potato market would be glutted by other farmers whose land had been legislatively idled by other AAA controls.

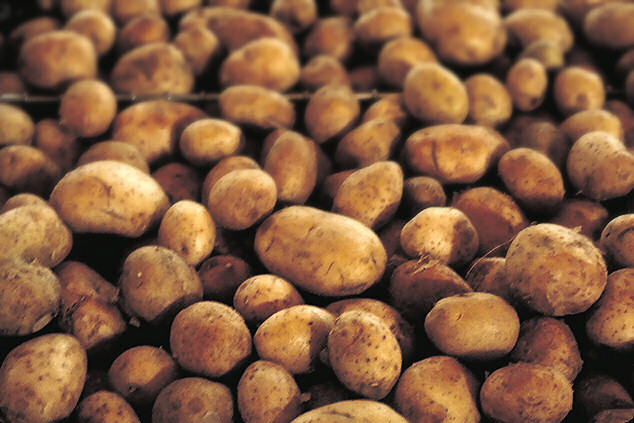
Potatoes

The law restricted the export of potatoes and mandated that they be used instead to provide direct relief to those in need. Because of the federal government's direct involvement in the economic affairs of American potato growers, this law was widely regarded as one of the most radical and controversial pieces of legislation enacted during the New Deal. The United States Supreme Court declared it unconstitutional in 1936.

The Potato Control legislation prevented individuals and companies from buying or offering to buy potatoes which were not packed in closed containers approved by the Secretary of Agriculture and bearing official government stamps. Penalties included a $1,000 fine on the first offense, and a year in jail and an additional $1,000 fine for a second offense. Farmers and brokers would not be issued the official stamps unless they paid a tax of $0.45 per bushel, or if they received tax-exemption stamps from the Secretary of Agriculture.

The law sparked considerable protest, as evident in the following 1935 declaration signed by citizens of West Amwell Township, New Jersey:

That we protest against and declare that we will not be bound by the 'Potato Control Law,' an unconstitutional measure recently enacted by the United States Congress. We shall produce on our own land such potatoes as we may wish to produce and will dispose of them in such manner as we may deem proper.

Included in the 1935 Potato Control Act was a provision that created the Federal Surplus Relief Corporation, a forerunner to The Emergency Food Assistance Program (TEFAP), which provides commodity food items like potatoes to soup kitchens, homeless shelters, and similar organizations that serve meals to the homeless and other individuals in need.

== See also ==
- Agricultural Adjustment Act Amendment of 1935
- Critics of the New Deal
- New Deal
- Great Depression
- New Deal coalition
