= Migrant and Seasonal Agricultural Workers Protection Act of 1983 =

American law that protects farm workers

Migrant and Seasonal Agricultural Workers Protection Act
- Long title: An Act to provide for the protection of migrant and seasonal agricultural workers and for the registration of contractors of migrant and seasonal agricultural labor and for other purposes.
- Acronyms (colloquial): MSAWPA
- Nicknames: Migrant and Seasonal Agricultural Workers Protection Act of 1982
- Enacted by: the 97th United States Congress
- Effective: April 14, 1983

Citations
- Public law: 97-470
- Statutes at Large: 96 Stat. 2583

Codification
- Acts repealed: Farm Labor Contractor Registration Act
- Titles amended: 29 U.S.C.: Labor
- U.S.C. sections created: 29 U.S.C. ch. 20 § 1801 et seq.

Legislative history
- Introduced in the House as H.R. 7102 by George Miller (D-CA) on September 14, 1982; Committee consideration by House Education and Labor; Passed the House on September 29, 1982 (Passed voice vote); Passed the Senate on December 19, 1982 (Passed voice vote) with amendment; House agreed to Senate amendment on December 20, 1982 (Agreed); Signed into law by President Ronald Reagan on January 14, 1983

The Migrant and Seasonal Agricultural Worker Protection Act (AWPA or MSPA) (public law 97-470) (January 14, 1983), codified at 29 U.S.C. §§ 1801-1872, is the main federal law that protects farm workers in the United States and repealed and replaced the Farm Labor Contractor Registration Act (P.L. 88-582).

The AWPA provides federal labor protections in the areas of labor contracting and recruitment, payment of wages, record keeping, housing, transportation, working conditions, and compliance with "working arrangements." The Act also requires farm labor contractors to register with the United States Department of Labor.

== Summary ==
It was enacted in 1983 to assist migrant and seasonal farm workers. It provides migrant and seasonal workers with social protections for transportation, housing, with pay, and work-related protections to safeguard them against occupational hazards and ensure better working conditions. Certain farm operators who are exempt from the Fair Labor Standards Act are also exempt from the MSPA. Farm labor contractors are not exempt from the MSPA and must register with the U.S. Department of Labor.

According to the Congressional State of Purpose, the goal of this policy is to "remove the restraints on commerce caused by activities detrimental to migrant and seasonal agricultural workers; to require farm labor contractors to register under this chapter; and to assure necessary protections for migrant and seasonal agricultural workers, agricultural associations, and agricultural employers."

Under the law, there are some major requirements for agricultural employers:

- To secure a certificate of registration from the U.S. Department of Labor before commencing any contracting of farm laborers.
- To provide proof that transportation vehicles meet standards and are insured.
- To show that housing meets state and federal safety and health standards
- To provide written information about wages, hours, workers' compensation, working conditions, and housing during the recruitment process.
- To maintain written payroll records and provide employee with written pay statement.

Agricultural employers and associations are responsible for MSPA compliance. If agricultural employers violate these provisions, there are specified penalties.

== Farm workers ==
Between 1 and 3 million people, mainly from Mexico, migrate each year to work on American farms. According to the 1998 National Agricultural Workers Survey, 81% of all farm workers were born outside the US and of those 95% were born in Mexico. Of the farm workers in America nearly 85% of them spoke Spanish as their native language, and farm workers average just years of education. Of foreign-born farm workers, only about 10% spoke English fluently.

Migrant workers come to work in jobs undesirable to many American citizens because of the often substandard working conditions and low pay. Many people leave their families behind in their home country with promises of returning with the fruits of their labor and the hope of a better life. However, the median income among these workers is a meager $7,500 a year, so they often do not have enough to bring back to their families.

Among migrant workers, approximately 52% are not allowed to work in the U.S. That brings with it the threat of deportation, along with the isolation and alienation that inevitably occurs when one moves to a foreign place, which often leads to workers feeling trapped on the farm at which they work.

== Pesticide use ==
A pesticide can be defined a "any substance or mixture of substances used to destroy, suppress or alter the life cycle of any pest." It is used to kill competing plants (herbicides) and control harmful insects (insecticides). Also, they can kill or suppress the growth of microorganisms, like bacteria, viruses, and fungi that live near crops (antimicrobial pesticides). The ultimate goal of controlling the growth of pests is to increase the crop yields.

The compounds are made up of two main types of ingredients: active, which control pests, and inert, which improve performance of the pesticides. For example, some inert ingredients are responsible for increasing the shelf life while other inert ingredients act as solvents for the active ingredients. It is important to know that not all inert ingredients are safe. In fact, adding inert ingredients to pesticides requires permission from the Environmental Protection Agency.

Pesticide use has increased significantly since the 1960s, from 196 million pounds in 1960 to 516 million pounds in 2008. Most pesticides are used in agriculture (72 percent), but 13 percent are used in homes and gardens. Glyphosate atrazine, metam sodium, and acetochlor are the most commonly used active ingredients in the US. The EPA estimated that between 180 and 185 million pounds of glyphosate were applied in 2007 while 28 and 33 million of pounds of acetochlor were applied in 2007.

The act is important to protect migrant workers from the detrimental health effects associated with occupational hazards of working in agriculture. Migrant workers can be affected by pesticides depending on the toxicity, the intensity or the duration of their exposure. Workers may come into contact with chemicals via inhalation, ingestion, or skin contact. Short-term exposure risks include eye and skin irritation and skin sensitivity. More intermediate effects from repeated exposure include neurotoxicity or nerve damage. Negative health effects are magnified and become increasingly serious after prolonged and repeated lifetime exposure, which include cancer, endocrine disruptions, and reproductive complications Potential genetic disorders and developmental disorders can occur from fetal exposure during pregnancy.
