= Coordinated Framework for Regulation of Biotechnology =

The Coordinated Framework for Regulation of Biotechnology, proposed in 1984 by the White House Office of Science and Technology Policy and finalized in 1986, spells out the basic federal policy for regulating the development and introduction of products derived from biotechnology.

This regulatory policy framework that was developed under President Ronald Reagan to ensure safety of the public and to ensure the continuing development of the fledgling biotechnology industry without overly burdensome regulation. The policy as it developed had three tenets: "(1) U.S. policy would focus on the product of genetic modification (GM) techniques, not the process itself, (2) only regulation grounded in verifiable scientific risks would be tolerated, and (3) GM products are on a continuum with existing products and, therefore, existing statutes are sufficient to review the products." These tenets were first described in the Coordinated Framework for Regulation of Biotechnology, published by the President's Domestic Policy Council Working Group on Biotechnology through the Office of Science and Technology Policy in 1986. The U.S. policy framework contrasts with that of some of its major trading partners: the European Union, Japan, South Korea, China, Australia and New Zealand either have or are establishing separate mandatory labeling requirements for products containing genetically modified organisms.

This framework governed specific agency policies. For example, the FDA's 1992 policy statement on genetically engineered plant foods treats "transferred genetic material and the intended expression product or products" in food derived from GM crops as food additives subject to existing food additive regulation, under which that material may be considered either generally recognized as safe (GRAS) or not, initially at the producer's determination. If the food additive is not GRAS, the producer is required to submit data proving that the food additive does not "adulterate" the food - in other words, that the additive is not injurious to health. With respect to GM food, the FDA retained its ability to take enforcement action any food it found to be "adulterated", which would make its producer "subject to the full range of enforcement measures under the act, including seizure, injunction, and criminal prosecution of those who fail to meet their statutory duty."

USDA regulation of genetically modified crops is based on the Plant Protection Act and its definition of "plant pest."
