= Farmland Protection Policy Act =

U.S. federal farmland protection law

Farmland Protection Policy Act of 1981
- Long title: An Act to establish a national farmland protection policy by limiting the extent to which Federal programs contribute to the conversion of farmland to nonagricultural uses, and for other purposes.
- Acronyms (colloquial): FPPA
- Enacted by: the 97th United States Congress
- Effective: June 22, 1982

Citations
- Public law: 97–98
- Statutes at Large: 95 Stat. 1341

Codification
- Titles amended: 7 U.S.C. §§ 4201–seq. et seq.

Legislative history
- Introduced in the Senate as S. 884 by Jesse Helms (R–NC) on April 7, 1981; Committee consideration by Senate Agriculture, Nutrition, and Forestry; Passed the Senate on September 18, 1981 (49–32); Passed the House on October 22, 1981 (192–160); Reported by the joint conference committee on December 9, 1981; agreed to by the Senate on December 10, 1981 (68–31) and by the House on December 16, 1981 (205–203); Signed into law by President Ronald Reagan on December 22, 1981

The Farmland Protection Policy Act of 1981 (FPPA) is a United States federal law that establishes a national policy to minimize the extent to which federal programs contribute to the unnecessary and irreversible conversion of productive farmland to nonagricultural uses. Enacted as subtitle I of title XV of the Agriculture and Food Act of 1981 (Public Law 97-98) and codified at 7 U.S.C. §§ 4201–seq. et seq., it directs federal agencies to take farmland impacts into account when designing and funding projects and to administer their programs, as far as practicable, in ways compatible with state, local and private farmland protection efforts.

The Act is primarily procedural: it does not itself prohibit development or authorize federal regulation of private land use, but instead requires agencies whose programs may convert farmland to identify affected lands, evaluate their agricultural importance using criteria developed by the United States Department of Agriculture (USDA), consider alternatives that would avoid or lessen impacts, and document their decisions. For FPPA purposes, "farmland" includes prime farmland, unique farmland, and farmland of statewide or local importance, while excluding land already in or committed to urban development or used for water storage. USDA, acting through the Natural Resources Conservation Service (NRCS), coordinates implementation by issuing regulations at 7 C.F.R. part 658, applying the Land Evaluation and Site Assessment (LESA) system, and assigning farmland conversion impact ratings that help agencies compare sites and consider project alternatives.

Highway and airport construction, utility corridors, water-resource projects and other federally assisted development that may permanently remove agricultural land from production are generally subject to FPPA review, while projects undertaken without federal assistance, certain activities within pre-existing rights-of-way, and some land uses that can be restored to agriculture are exempt. The statute does not create a private right of action for landowners or advocacy groups, but amendments in the Food Security Act of 1985 require USDA to submit annual implementation reports to Congress and authorize state governors to sue the federal government for alleged violations of that state's farmland protection policy.

Subsequent farm bills have built on the FPPA framework by creating and expanding federal easement and financing programs that support state and local farmland-preservation initiatives, including the Farms for the Future Act and the Farmland Protection Program, later consolidated into the Agricultural Conservation Easement Program. These programs are intended to complement, rather than replace, the FPPA's procedural requirements, which operate alongside other environmental review processes such as NEPA review.

The FPPA has been the subject of sustained criticism. Scholars trace its origins to what they describe as a late-1970s and early-1980s "vanishing farmland" scare associated with the USDA's National Agricultural Lands Study, arguing that early estimates of rapid farmland loss were exaggerated or based on misinterpreted data and that the empirical case for a looming national cropland shortage was weak even at the time of enactment. Land-use and housing analysts further contend that farmland-protection policies influenced by the FPPA can restrict the supply of developable land on metropolitan fringes, contributing to higher land and housing costs and conferring benefits mainly on incumbent landowners and established communities. Some commentators therefore characterise the FPPA as a modest federal response whose crisis-driven origins, limited enforcement mechanisms and potential distributional effects have left its long-term role in national farmland policy contested.

== Background ==
Concerns about the loss of agricultural land to urban and suburban development grew in the United States after the 1960s, when millions of acres of farmland were converted to residential, industrial, transportation and other nonfarm uses. A 1996 Federal Register notice summarizing federal farmland protection efforts reported that since 1960 an average of roughly 1.5 million acres of farmland per year had been converted to other uses, often in metropolitan and rapidly developing counties that also produced a large share of the nation's fruits, vegetables and dairy products.

By the late 1970s, states and local governments had begun experimenting with farmland preservation tools such as agricultural zoning, differential property taxation, and purchase or transfer of development rights, but there was no comprehensive national farmland protection policy. Congress responded in the 1981 farm bill by creating the FPPA, which declared farmland a "unique natural resource" and directed that federal programs should be administered, as far as practicable, in ways compatible with state, local and private efforts to protect farmland.

== Provisions ==
=== Findings and purpose ===
Section 4201 of title 7 sets out congressional findings about the importance of farmland and the problems posed by its conversion. Congress found that the nation's farmland provides essential food and fiber, that significant amounts of farmland are irreversibly converted each year to nonagricultural uses, that such conversion can undermine rural economies, and that federal actions sometimes contribute to that loss when other options would be preferable.

The stated purpose of the chapter is to minimize the extent to which federal programs cause unnecessary and irreversible conversion of farmland to nonagricultural uses and to ensure that, to the extent practicable, federal programs are administered in a manner compatible with state, local, and private farmland protection programs and policies.

=== Definitions of farmland and federal programs ===
For purposes of the FPPA, "farmland" includes three categories:

- Prime farmland – land with the best combination of soil and other characteristics for producing food, feed, fiber and forage with minimal inputs and without excessive erosion, as determined by the Secretary of Agriculture.
- Unique farmland – non-prime land used to grow specific high-value food and fiber crops, such as fruits and vegetables, that requires a particular combination of soil quality, climate, and moisture to produce sustained high yields.
- Farmland of statewide or local importance – other land identified by state or local agencies, and accepted by the Secretary, as important for agricultural production.

Farmland subject to the FPPA does not have to be currently cropped; it can include pasture, rangeland or forest land. However, land that is already in or committed to urban development or used for water storage is excluded.

The term "federal program" encompasses federal agency activities that involve undertaking, financing, or assisting construction or improvement projects, or acquiring, managing or disposing of federal lands and facilities. Projects that were beyond the planning stage and already in active design or construction on the FPPA's effective date are excluded from the definition.

=== Farmland protection policy and agency duties ===
Under the FPPA, USDA is directed to develop criteria for identifying and taking into account the adverse effects of federal programs on farmland.7 U.S.C. § 4202 Federal agencies whose programs may convert farmland directly or indirectly must:

- identify farmland that would be affected by their actions;
- use USDA criteria and the Land Evaluation and Site Assessment (LESA) system to evaluate the relative agricultural value of that land;
- consider alternatives that would reduce or avoid impacts on important farmland; and
- ensure that their programs, to the extent practicable, are compatible with state, local and private farmland protection policies.

USDA's regulations implementing the FPPA are codified at 7 C.F.R. part 658. The NRCS works with other agencies and project sponsors by applying a land evaluation and site assessment system and assigning a farmland conversion impact rating score to proposed project sites, using standard forms such as AD-1006 and CPA-106. The score is intended to help agencies compare sites and consider whether projects should be redesigned, relocated, or otherwise modified to lessen adverse effects on farmland.

=== Projects covered and exemptions ===
Projects are generally subject to the FPPA if they may irreversibly convert farmland and are carried out by a federal agency or with federal financial or technical assistance. Examples include highway and airport construction, electric and telephone transmission projects, reservoir and hydroelectric projects, and other federally assisted development that would take agricultural land out of production.

Activities not subject to the FPPA include projects planned and completed entirely without federal assistance; federal permitting and licensing activities that do not involve federal funding or land management; projects on land already in urban development or water storage; certain construction within pre-existing rights-of-way acquired before August 4, 1984; construction necessary for on-farm operations; and some activities such as surface mining where restoration to agricultural use is planned.

=== Limitations and enforcement ===
The FPPA contains an explicit "statement of limitation" providing that the subtitle does not authorize the federal government to regulate the use of private or non-federal land or to affect the property rights of landowners. It functions instead as a procedural constraint on federal agencies, requiring them to consider farmland impacts when they design and fund projects.

The statute itself does not create a private right of action for landowners or advocacy groups. The Food Security Act of 1985 amended the FPPA to require USDA to submit annual reports to the agriculture committees of Congress on implementation of the Act and to give state governors authority to bring suit against the federal government for alleged violations of that state's farmland protection policy.

== Legislative history ==
The FPPA originated as a farmland protection subtitle in what became the Agriculture and Food Act of 1981, sometimes called the 1981 farm bill, which was introduced in the Senate as S. 884 and signed into law by President Ronald Reagan on December 22, 1981. Subtitle I (Farmland Protection Policy Act) appears in title XV of the Act and was later codified in chapter 73 of title 7 of the United States Code.

The law became effective six months after enactment, on June 22, 1982. Early implementation focused on issuing USDA guidance for identifying prime and unique farmland and developing procedures for federal agencies to consult NRCS when planning projects that might convert farmland.

Subsequent farm bills expanded and adjusted farmland protection policy. Section 1255 of the Food Security Act of 1985 amended the FPPA by requiring annual implementation reports to Congress and authorizing governors to sue the federal government for noncompliance with state farmland protection policies. The Food, Agriculture, Conservation, and Trade Act of 1990 created the Farms for the Future Act, a related program providing federal guarantees and interest assistance for state farmland preservation trust funds, although this demonstration program was time-limited and separate from the FPPA's procedural requirements.

The Federal Agriculture Improvement and Reform Act of 1996 established the Farmland Protection Program, under which the federal government helped purchase agricultural conservation easements to keep land in agricultural use, and later farm bills converted and expanded this authority into the Farm and Ranch Lands Protection Program and then the Agricultural Conservation Easement Program. These easement programs complement, but do not replace, the FPPA's requirement that agencies avoid unnecessary farmland conversion.

== Implementation and impact ==
NRCS serves as the lead technical agency for FPPA implementation. When another federal agency proposes a project that may convert farmland, NRCS evaluates the soils and other agricultural characteristics of the affected land, assigns a farmland conversion impact rating, and provides technical recommendations. Project sponsors complete the site assessment portion of the standard forms, addressing factors such as local agricultural economy, compatibility with surrounding land uses, and the likelihood of future development pressure.

The farmland conversion impact rating system uses combined scores for land quality and site factors to compare sites and help agencies decide whether to redesign projects, choose alternative locations with lower agricultural value, or implement mitigation measures. The FPPA process is meant to be used alongside other environmental review requirements, such as NEPA review, rather than as a standalone permitting program.

Annual reports issued by NRCS summarize the number and types of projects reviewed under the FPPA and the acreage of farmland affected. Federal projects commonly reviewed include highway expansions, airport improvements, utility corridors and some water resource projects. The Farmland Information Center describes the FPPA as the first explicit national farmland protection policy and notes that it has helped integrate farmland concerns into federal planning, even though it does not directly stop development.

== Relationship to state and local farmland protection ==
The FPPA is designed to support, rather than supplant, state and local farmland protection efforts. Its stated purpose includes assuring that federal programs are administered in a manner compatible with state, local and private initiatives to protect farmland. Many states and local governments operate purchase of development rights programs, agricultural district laws, right-to-farm statutes and agricultural zoning, and FPPA reviews often take those policies into account when agencies weigh alternatives and mitigation measures.

== Criticism ==
Scholars of agricultural and land-use policy have argued that the Farmland Protection Policy Act was adopted amid what they describe as a late-1970s and early-1980s "vanishing farmland" scare. Legal and policy commentators note that the Act followed the USDA's National Agricultural Lands Study (NALS), which portrayed the conversion of prime agricultural land as a serious national crisis and helped spur Congress to enact the FPPA as a way to ensure that federal programs did not "unnecessarily and irreversibly" convert farmland. Historians of farmland preservation similarly describe how popular and official discourse during this period framed agricultural land as "disappearing" or "vanishing," giving farmland preservation unusual political salience.

A number of agricultural economists and legal scholars later contended that the crisis narrative underlying the FPPA rested on faulty or badly misinterpreted data. In a widely cited critique of NALS, Philip M. Raup argued that the study exaggerated annual "farmland loss" by equating broad categories of "rural" land with agricultural land, and concluded that the United States was not actually losing three million acres of farmland per year; he blamed a "demand for shocking statistics" for what he called serious misuse of the NALS data. William A. Fischel likewise challenged the NALS methodology and projections, maintaining that land markets generally allocate agricultural land to its highest valued use and warning that NALS-inspired policy had "serious potential to cause economic mischief" by enabling local interests to block development for reasons unrelated to broader social costs.

Johnson and Fogleman describe a "rising tide" of published opposition to the FPPA's basic premise that farmland conversion posed a grave national threat, pointing to collections such as The Cropland Crisis: Myth or Reality? and The Vanishing Farmland Crisis, in which many contributors concluded that a nationwide cropland shortage was unlikely. Journalist Gregg Easterbrook later reported that the USDA's Soil Conservation Service had effectively retracted the most alarming NALS figures, acknowledging that earlier estimates of land being "paved over" had been "markedly overstated," and he argued that the "America-is-losing-its-farmland" crisis had been "called off" once more accurate data became available. Legal scholar Jim Chen similarly notes that NALS-based assertions about rapid farmland loss have been questioned by subsequent USDA technical work, as well as by economists such as Julian Simon and by Easterbrook's reassessment of the data.

On the basis of this literature, some authors characterise the FPPA as a federal response to an overstated "vanishing farmland" alarm, arguing that the empirical case for a looming national shortage of cropland was weak even at the time of enactment and has only grown weaker as better data have become available. Michael Bunce, reviewing three decades of North American farmland-preservation debates, concludes that crisis rhetoric about disappearing farmland was often simplistic and alarmist, yet proved politically effective in justifying new preservation programs, including federal interventions, even as subsequent work showed that the statistics underpinning the scare were contested and subject to revision.

Critics also argue that by making it more difficult for federally assisted projects to convert farmland, the FPPA and related policies can have unintended consequences for housing availability and affordability, especially on the metropolitan fringe. Building on Fischel's analysis, Johnson and Fogleman warn that farmland-retention policies inspired by NALS risk empowering "parochial interests" to restrict new housing and other development, thereby constraining the supply of buildable land around growing urban areas. A widely cited analysis by the Urban Land Institute similarly concluded that governmental efforts to retard cropland conversion were unnecessary in many regions and could "create harm" by raising the cost of housing, a view later echoed by President Ronald Reagan's Commission on Housing, which recommended repeal of the FPPA on housing-policy grounds.

Land-use analysts have further observed that when preservation programs remove some agricultural parcels from the urban land market, the remaining developable land may rise in price, which in turn can increase the cost of new housing. Commentators on later federal conservation-easement programs, which build on the FPPA framework, have cited this dynamic in arguing that federal farmland protection can raise housing costs by tightening land-supply constraints in high-growth regions. In this view, the benefits of preservation—higher land values, conservation payments, and amenity protection—accrue mainly to existing landowners and established communities, while would-be new residents and first-time homebuyers face higher barriers to entry into those markets.

Even authors who endorse long-term safeguards for cropland sometimes share parts of this critique. Johnson and Fogleman, for example, accept that intergenerational concerns about future food production justify some attention to farmland conversion, but nonetheless describe the FPPA as a "stillbirth" whose weak implementation and crisis-driven origins left it vulnerable to attack both on empirical grounds and for its distributional and housing-market effects. Subsequent debates over federal farmland policy have therefore often turned on whether preservation tools can be redesigned to protect agricultural land and rural amenities without unduly constraining the supply of land for housing or reinforcing what critics see as exclusionary advantages for incumbent landowners at the urban fringe.

== See also ==
- Agriculture and Food Act of 1981
- Farmland preservation
- Agricultural Conservation Easement Program
- Natural Resources Conservation Service
- American Farmland Trust
