= Federal Plant Pest Act of 1957 =

U.S. federal legislation

- Long title: An Act to facilitate the regulation, control, and eradication of plant pests.
- Enacted by: the 85th United States Congress
- Effective: May 23, 1957

Citations
- Public law: 85-36
- Statutes at Large: 71 Stat. 31

Codification
- Titles amended: 7 U.S.C.: Agriculture
- U.S.C. sections created: 7 U.S.C. ch. 7B §§ 150aa-150jj
- U.S.C. sections amended: 7 U.S.C. ch. 7 § 147a

Legislative history
- Introduced in the Senate as S. 1442 by Allen J. Ellender (D-LA) on March 26, 1957; Committee consideration by Senate Agricultural and Forestry, House Agricultural; Passed the Senate on March 29, 1957 (Passed); Passed the House on April 11, 1957 (Passed) with amendment; Senate agreed to House amendment on May 8, 1957 (Agreed); Signed into law by President Dwight D. Eisenhower on May 23, 1957

The Federal Plant Pest Act of 1957 (P.L. 85–36) prohibited the movement of pests from a foreign country into or through the United States unless authorized by United States Department of Agriculture (USDA).

It was superseded by the Plant Protection Act of 2000 (P.L. 106–224, Title IV). Under the new law, the Animal and Plant Health Inspection Service (APHIS) retains broad authority to inspect, seize, quarantine, treat, destroy or dispose of imported plant and animal materials that are potentially harmful to U.S. agriculture, horticulture, forestry, and, to a certain degree, natural resources. (7 U.S.C. 7701 et seq.).

== Titles of the act ==
The 1957 Act was drafted as two titles defining policy standards for the control, eradication, and regulation of plant pests.

Title I - Federal Plant Pest Act - 7 U.S.C. §§ 150aa-150jj

Definitions
Dissemination of plant pests
Postal laws
Seizure of infected plants
Regulations and conditions
Inspections and seizures
Penalty
Separability
Disinfection of railway cars
Repeals

Title II - Eradication and Control of Insect Pests, Plant Diseases, and Nematodes - 7 U.S.C. § 147a

Department of Agriculture Organic Act of 1944 amendment
