= Title 9 of the Code of Federal Regulations =

US title on animals and animals products

CFR Title 9 – Animals and Animal Products is one of 50 titles composing the United States Code of Federal Regulations (CFR) and contains the principal set of rules and regulations issued by federal agencies regarding animals and animal products. It is available in digital and printed form and can be referenced online using the Electronic Code of Federal Regulations (e-CFR).

== Structure ==
The table of contents, as reflected in the e-CFR updated March 5, 2014, is as follows:

Volume	Chapter	Parts	Regulatory Entity
1	I	1-199	Animal and Plant Health Inspection Service, Department of Agriculture
2	II	200-299	Grain Inspection, Packers and Stockyards Administration (Packers and Stockyards Programs), Department of Agriculture
	III	300-599	Food Safety and Inspection Service, Department of Agriculture

== Chapter 1 ==
Chapter 1 of Title 9, titled "Animal and Plant Health Inspection Service, Department of Agriculture," is divided into sub-chapters A-L

=== Subchapter A ===
Subchapter A, titled "Animal Welfare," contains the introductory information for Chapter 1, such as definitions, regulations, and standards, as well as rules of proceedings regarding the Animal Welfare Act of 1966 and the Horse Protection Act of 1970 .

=== Subchapter B ===
This subchapter, titled "Cooperative Control and Eradication of Livestock or Poultry," lists additional rules of procedure, as well as guidelines and restrictions regarding animal destruction due to Tuberculosis, Brucellosis, Pseudorabies, Foot-and-mouth disease, Rinderpest, Pleuropneumonia, and other communicable diseases. It also lists guidelines for control of Scrapie, Chronic Wasting Disease, and H5/H7.

=== Subchapter C ===
Titled "Interstate Transportation of Animals (Including Poultry) and Animal Products," Subchapter C provides regulations for transportation of animals and products, with specific provisions for special-case restrictions such as those for cattle with Scabies, transportation of land tortoises, and communicable diseases such as Babesia bovis, Chlamydiosis, Johne's Disease, etc.

=== Subchapter D ===
Titled "Exportation and Importation of Animals (Including Poultry) and Animal Products," this subchapter handles regulations for exporting and importing animals, most specifically exportation inspection, species importation restrictions, sanitation and waste during travel, importation of embryos and semen, and restrictions for animals with communicable diseases (see above).

=== Subchapter E ===
Subchapter E, titled "Viruses, Serums, Toxins, and Analogous Products; Organisms and Vectors," is the largest subchapter in Chapter 1 of Title 9. It most handles regulations regarding permits and licensing, as well as standard and production requirements.

=== Subchapter F ===
This subchapter is titled "User Fees" and handles requirements and regulations regarding standard fees.

== Amendment ==
Title 9 of the Code of Federal Regulations was last amended on January 1, 2006. It has SuDocs Classification number AE 2.106/3:9/
