= Warehouse Act of 1916 =

- Other short titles: United States Warehouse Act
- Nicknames: Agricultural Department Appropriations Act of 1916
- Enacted by: the 64th United States Congress
- Effective: August 11, 1916

Citations
- Public law: 64-190
- Statutes at Large: 39 Stat. 446a aka 39 Stat. 486

Codification
- Titles amended: 7 U.S.C.: Agriculture
- U.S.C. sections created: 7 U.S.C. ch. 10 § 241 et seq.

Legislative history
- Introduced in the House as H.R. 12717 by Asbury Francis Lever (D-SC) on March 4, 1916; Passed the House on May 2, 1916 (292-42); Passed the Senate on July 12, 1916 (31-27); Reported by the joint conference committee on July 18, 1916; agreed to by the House on August 3, 1916 (Agreed) and by the Senate on August 3, 1916 (34-25); Signed into law by President Woodrow Wilson on August 11, 1916

The Warehouse Act of 1916 permitted Federal Reserve member banks to give loans to farmers on the security of their staple crops which were kept in Federal storage units as collateral.

== Advocacy ==
United States President Woodrow Wilson proposed the Warehouse Act at a political nomination convention in Sea Girt, New Jersey on September 2, 1916:

For the farmers of the country we have virtually created commercial credit, by means of the Federal Reserve Act and the Rural Credits Act. They now have the standing of other business men in the money market. We have successfully regulated speculation in "futures" and established standards in the marketing of grains. By an intelligent Warehouse Act we have assisted to make the standard crops available as never before both for systematic marketing and as a security for loans from the banks. We have greatly added to the work of neighborhood demonstration on the farm itself of improved methods of cultivation, and, through the intelligent extension of the functions of the Department of Agriculture, have made it possible for the farmer to learn systematically where his best markets are and how to get at them.

== Amendments ==
The table below shows U.S. Congressional amendments to the Warehouse Act.

Date of Enactment	Public Law Number	U.S. Statute Citation	U.S. Legislative Bill	U.S. Presidential Administration
July 24, 1919	P.L. 66-22	41 Stat. 234	H.R. 7413	Woodrow Wilson
February 23, 1923	P.L. 67-436	42 Stat. 1282	S. 3220	Warren G. Harding
March 2, 1931	P.L. 71-772	46 Stat. 1463	H.R. 7	Herbert C. Hoover
October 28, 1992	P.L. 102-553	106 Stat. 4140	H.R. 6128	George H. W. Bush
November 9, 2000	P.L. 106-472	114 Stat. 2058	H.R. 4788	William J. Clinton

== See also ==
- Combine harvester
- Grain elevator
- Grain Futures Act
- Grain Standards Act of 1916
