= National School Lunch Act =

U.S. federal law passed in 1946

Children eating a meal as part of the school lunch program at a classroom in Maryland. The U.S. Department of Agriculture's (USDA) deputy under secretary Janey Thornton is present for an event to launch International School Meals Day on March 8, 2013. The class is video conferencing to a school in Ayrshire, Scotland, with some of their children visible on the screens.

The National School Lunch Act (79 P.L. 396, 60 Stat. 230) is a 1946 United States federal law that created the National School Lunch Program (NSLP) to provide low-cost or free school lunch meals to qualified students through subsidies to schools. Prior to the passage of the Act, direct support of school lunches were done on the state level, or it was provided through federal aid that was not specifically designed for school lunches.

The program was established as a way to prop up food prices by absorbing farm surpluses, while at the same time providing food to school-age children. The Act was signed into law by President Harry S. Truman in 1946 and entered the federal government into schools' dietary programs on June 4, 1946. In 1999, the act's name was changed to honor Richard Russell Jr., senator from Georgia, who championed its passage.

Since its passage, it has received many amendments and updates due to price, safety, and health concerns; it has been a subject of heavy debate within academia since the early 2000s, and the debate has continued to evolve as statistical tests and the NSLP have both improved.

The majority of the support provided to schools participating in the program comes in the form of a cash reimbursement for each meal served. Schools are also entitled to receive commodity foods and additional commodities as they are available from surplus agricultural stocks. The National School Lunch Program served nearly 29.4 million students as of the 2023-2024 school year, with 21.1 million receiving free or reduced-price lunches.

== Early programs ==
School feeding in the United States underwent the same evolution as in Europe, beginning with sporadic food services undertaken by private societies and associations interested in child welfare and education.

=== New York City ===
The Children's Aid Society of New York initiated a program in 1853, serving meals to students attending the vocational school.

At the end of 1914, more than 24,000 children were offered a homemade lunch. There was also a morning snack of crackers and hot milk offered for three cents to children who were considered weak or crippled.

=== Philadelphia ===
In 1894, the Starr Center Association in Philadelphia began serving penny lunches in one school, later expanding the service to another. Soon a lunch committee was established within the Home and School League, and lunches were extended to include nine schools in the city.

In 1909, Dr. Cheesman A. Herrick, who was principal of the William Penn High School for Girls was credited with accomplishing the transfer of responsibilities for the operation and support of the lunch program from charitable organizations to the Philadelphia School Board. He requested that a system be established to ensure that the lunches served would be based upon sound principles of nutrition and required that the program be under the direction of a home economics graduate. The Board granted his request on an experimental basis and on the condition that the program would be self-supporting. The experiment proved successful, and the following year lunch services were extended to the Southern Manual Training School and later to three additional units.

In the spring of 1912, the School Board established a Department of High School Lunches and directed that the food services be inaugurated in all the high schools of the city. During all this time the Home and School League had continued operating the feeding program in the nine elementary schools and continued to do so until May 1915, when it reported to the Board that the need for a lunch system had been clearly demonstrated and that it could not be successfully operated by an organization outside the school system. As a result, the School Board placed the operation of both high school and elementary lunch programs under the supervision of the Department of High School Lunches and authorized the extension of the program to other elementary schools.

=== Boston ===
The New England Kitchen began offering school lunches in Boston as early as the 1890s, despite opposition from school janitors who supplemented their income with snack tables.

In September 1908, the Women's Educational and Industrial Union in Boston began to supply hot lunches to high schools that were under the supervision of the Boston School Committee. A central kitchen system was used and lunches were transported to the participating schools.

In January 1910, an experimental program for elementary schools took the form of a mid-morning lunch prepared by the class in Home Economics three days each week. On two days of each week, sandwiches and milk were served. The children ate their meals at their desks, there being no lunchroom in the building. Before the end of the school year (1909–10) five additional schools were benefiting from the program, and a total of 2,000 pupils were being served each day, according to a report submitted by Ellen H. Richards in the "Journal of Home Economics" for December 1910.

== Federal support prior to passage ==
As schools began to expand their food services, school lunch funding, which was primarily done through local means, was no longer enough. Governments, school boards, and outside institutions could no longer support school cafeterias; it was evident that Federal support was necessary if schools wanted to continue the progression of their lunch programs. The first instance of broader support came from the Reconstruction Finance Corporation in 1932 and 1933, which provided loans to towns in Southwestern Missouri to cover the cost of labor involved in school lunches. Similar aid was provided elsewhere in 1933 and 1934 by the Civil Works Administration and the Federal Emergency Relief Administration, which covered labor costs in 39 states.

At the same time, the United States was suffering from the Great Depression. There was a lack of markets for farmers to sell in, and when they did, their profit margins were barely enough to sustain them. Families struggled to provide food at home, and many children could not afford school lunches, leading to child malnutrition. Section 32 of Public Law 320, or the Agricultural Adjustment Act Amendment of 1935, passed by the 74th congress allowed the Secretary of Agriculture to allocate funds from customs receipts; a majority of the funds were used to purchase agricultural products from farmers in order to limit market supply and thus increase prices and income. The purchased products were then given to schools to use to provide children with lunches.

The act continued due to its success, seeing more funding being allocated as a result. Funding decreased once the United States joined the Allies' effort in World War II, and schools' access to food decreased with the military needing more supplies from farmers. School lunch program participation declined, and the 78th Congress amended the act in 1943 in order to ensure that the funding was being used to buy food, rather than pay for labor or equipment, and participation once again increased.

== Modifications and improvements ==
Since the Act passed, Congress has modified several aspects of the policy. Congress amended the NSLP in 1962 to adjust fund distribution. They decided that the budget allocated to each state should be influenced by the state's need for further assistance. Rather than just factoring in the number of participants, Congress took into account the state poverty level compared to the national poverty level. Then, in 1968, Congress improved the NSLP food options to accommodate students with special dietary needs.

More recently, in 2012, First Lady Michelle Obama took on the issue of school lunches. Changes that she initiated primarily focused on more specific nutritional requirements. The changes include updated food group nutrition standards, such as vegetable subgroups, re-adjusted meat, and grain serving sizes to reflect different school grade ranges, an implemented requirement for whole grains, and milk-fat restrictions. Lower calorie ranges and a 10-year progressive sodium reduction plan also started in 2012. The alterations received criticism after implementation in 2014. Critics argued that the increased costs that would be a result would be a waste of resources and deter families from participating in the program if they were not eligible for free lunches. They also argued that it could lead to increased food waste because children would not enjoy the healthier options. Economic concerns faded once it was made clear that concerns arose due to a recent recession, and the changes remained primarily in order to combat rising rates of childhood obesity.

As of 2025, President Trump implemented changes to the NSLP through his Make America Healthy Again executive order; he has restricted the percentage of food that schools can purchase from other countries to ten percent. Greater sugar restrictions are also being instituted, and by 2027, the amount of calories students can consume weekly from sugar will be restricted to ten percent. Schools are also focused on eliminating artificial dyes from their menus and making food from scratch.

Due to Public Law 119-69, signed on January 14, 2026, schools are able to offer nondairy milks alongside dairy and must provide nondairy milk if requested by parents.

== Nutrition, behavior, and learning ==
Nutrition standards for the National School Lunch Program and National School Breakfast Program were updated in 2012. This update in nutritional standards was funded through a federal statute signed into law by President Barack Obama; The Healthy, Hunger-Free Kids Act of 2010 funds free lunch programs in public schools for the next five years. The new guidelines require students to choose either a serving of fruit or vegetables every meal. Also, the portions must now be larger.

Along with larger portions of fruits and vegetables, the National School Lunch Program now enforces a variety of other nutritional requirements. Food products and ingredients used to prepare school meals must contain zero grams of added trans fat per serving (less than 0.5 grams per serving as defined by the FDA). Furthermore, a meal can provide no more than 30 percent of calories from fat and less than 10 percent from saturated fat.

In late 2009, the Institute of Medicine of the National Academies released School Meals: Building Blocks For Healthy Children. This report reviews and provides recommendations to update the nutrition standard and the meal requirements for the National School Lunch Program and School Breakfast Program. School Meals also sets standards for menu planning that focus on food groups, calories, saturated fat, and sodium, and that incorporate Dietary Guidelines for Americans and the Dietary Reference Intakes.

Nutrition plays a critical role in cognitive development and academic performance for children; undernourished children are more likely to be less energetic and less able to concentrate. The day-to-day observation of teachers and administrators of the relationship between inadequate nutrition and behavior and the ability to learn is substantiated by scientific studies. Twenty Cape Town, South Africa, children were studied for 11 years, beginning in 1955. The study was based on the hypothesis "that the ill effects of under-nutrition are determined by (1) its occurrence during the period of maximum growth and (2) the duration of under-nutrition relative to the total period of growth ... Evidence is cumulative and impressive that severe under-nutrition during the first 2 years of life, when brain growth is most active, results in a permanent reduction of brain size and restricted intellectual development." Some basic micronutrients are necessary for children to maintain a good status of learning, such as iron and vitamin B12. Iron deficiency puts a child at risk of cognitive delay and lower math scores.

== Food safety ==
In December 2009, a report was released that showed that fast food restaurants were far more rigorous in checking for bacteria and dangerous pathogens in beef and chicken than the school lunch program.

A 2018 study by USDA and University of Connecticut researchers compared data from mandatory safety inspections for ground beef for the NSLP and separate data from random USDA inspections. The study found that the beef destined for the NSLP had fewer levels of test failures than beef for the market generally, although a study author noted that "ground beef that fails the National School Lunch Program's inspection can be sold to other vendors and eventually make its way onto consumers' plates." Between 2005 and 2014, there were no outbreaks of Salmonella and E. coli linked to beef provided to the NSLP, although there were dozens of such outbreaks in commercially sold ground beef over the same period.

== Native Americans and children of color ==
In December 2014, Indian Country Today reported that 68 percent of Native American and Alaska Native students "are eligible for free and reduced-price school lunches, compared with 28 percent of white students. USDA data indicate that 70 percent of children receiving free lunches through the NSLP are children of color, as are 50 percent of students receiving reduced-price lunches." The article expressed concern regarding efforts to undercut nutrition standards and notes that several Native American schools are working to improve the quality of school lunches by using produce from school gardens, or tribally grown buffalo meat.

== Controversy ==
Beginning in the early 2000's, the NSLP became a subject of intense scrutiny within academia. There has been a debate on whether the program facilitates, lessens, or has no effect on childhood obesity rates. The argument is made up by three different sides: the NSLP increases childhood obesity rates, it decreases rates, and a third group that says that the NSLP has different effects on different people.

It was very common from 2000 to 2010 for people to write about the NSLP and conclude that it contributed to childhood obesity. Many economists chose to write about the program in the 2010s; they first repeated the experiments that led the researchers in the 2000s to conclude that the NSLP led to childhood obesity, and they made the same conclusion. They then implemented controls for factors such as home income and genetic history of obesity. When considering these factors, researchers concluded that the NSLP did not contribute to childhood obesity. Rather, it decreased rates of childhood obesity in participants.

More recently, research has continued and been updated along with the NSLP. Experiments have been continuously repeated in order to verify their findings, and to ensure that they still apply with the new NSLP standards. Research that was published in 2024 found that the findings of the NSLP not contributing to childhood obesity is generally true, aside from two potential exceptions; they found that rates of childhood obesity increased in boys and impoverished children. The results for the boys were not statistically significant, although it was proposed that further research is warranted.

All research has found that impoverished children are more likely to see increased rates of childhood obesity when participating in the NSLP; it is a product of the quality of food being lesser at their schools compared to non-impoverished children, and outside factors like the quality of food that they eat outside of federally provided lunches.

== Current challenges ==
=== Caloric and nutritional needs ===
For some time, the measurement on which the NSLP based its cash reimbursements and meal provisions largely came from caloric requirements. However, while this worked at a time when malnutrition plagued the nation's poor, a continuing focus on caloric intake ignores the growing national obesity epidemic. Balancing nutrition and calories has always been a challenge for the NSLP and its participating schools. This struggle can undermine schools that wish to comply with the national standards while still advocating healthy lifestyles.

Another problem that contributes to this challenge is that nutritious food is often considered less favorable than competitive food that is available to students. Given the choice, students will often prefer competitive foods that that have looser federal minimum nutrition standards, as opposed to those enforced by the NSLP. Although competitive foods have minimum nutrition standards, there is no restriction on the quantity students can purchase.

=== Competitive foods ===
In the US, the term competitive foods refers to any food source that competes with a lunch program's offerings. Such competitive foods include fast food offerings, a la carte food lines, and vending machines. A study was done in the 2009–2010 school year across 47 states and 622 districts to examine how much of the districts' competitive food and drink policy complied with Dietary Guidelines for Americans (DGA) recommendations. One of the major reasons for this study to be done is the Healthy, Hunger-Free Kids Act which requires schools to establish science-based nutrition standards for competitive foods called a wellness plan. These provisions for competitive food and drinks included limits on specific nutrients in the food, such as sodium and fats. Less than 5% of districts met or exceeded DGA requirements. Only about 4% of districts across the nation required fruits and vegetables to be sold within the competitive foods which in no way helps the fruit and vegetable intake of students that is already sub-par.

=== Food waste ===
In a study of the Boston Public Schools, "on average, students discarded roughly 19 percent of their entrées, 47 percent of their fruit, 25 percent of their milk, and 73 percent of their vegetables." "It was estimated that $432,349.05 worth of food is wasted annually at lunch by students in Grades 6–8 in [Boston Public Schools]." Overall, this sum makes up 26.1 percent of these three schools' food budgets, excluding labor and supplies. If translated nationally, Cohen estimates that roughly $1,238,846,400 in food is wasted on an annual basis.

One reason that students discard this amount of food has to do with à la carte lines and vending machines. In a 1998 study of 16 randomly selected schools in St. Paul, Minnesota, the authors discovered a negative correlation between à la carte lines, vending machine use, and fruit and vegetable consumption. On average, students from schools without an à la carte line consumed nearly an entire serving more of fruit and vegetables than did students with such programs. Furthermore, students from all schools exceeded the daily USDA recommended calories from saturated fat, and students from schools with à la carte lines exceeded the recommendations by one percent more, on average. Concerning snack vending machines, the authors determined that with each vending machine present, "students' mean intake of fruit servings decreased by 11 percent." Beverage machines showed no significant impact.

=== Rising costs ===
A challenge for schools that take part in the NSLP is the rising costs of producing lunch. According to the School Lunch and Breakfast Cost Study (SLBCS), one in four school districts reported costs for school lunches above the program reimbursement rate. The additional cost must then be supplemented by school district general funds, and this puts a strain on school district budgets. Additional costs also make it difficult to meet federally mandated nutrition requirements because using the best palatable foods for students becomes too expensive.

According to the 2008 USDA report on the NSLP, "other sources of increasing costs include increases in health care costs for employees and, more recently, rising food costs." For example, in 2008, some school systems in Alabama, California, and Texas raised meal prices to keep up with "steep increases in food costs." The school districts raised prices for paying students while keeping prices the same for students that qualified for reduced-price or free lunches. This method of cost adjustment leaves either the school district or paying students to bear the burden of the price increase.

== National School Lunch Week ==
National School Lunch Week takes place on the second Sunday in October. Each year since October 9, 1962, the United States Congress requests the president to issue a proclamation calling the country to observe the week.

== See also ==
- Child and Adult Care Food Program
- Child Nutrition Act of 1966
- Institute of Child Nutrition
- Free school meal
- Oslo breakfast
- Tino De Angelis – intentionally sold spoiled meat to the National School Lunch Program
