= National Nutrition Monitoring and Related Research Act of 1990 =

The National Nutrition Monitoring and Related Research Act of 1990 (P.L. 101-445) was a statute enacted by United States Congress to establish a comprehensive, coordinated program for nutrition monitoring, and related research to improve the assessment of the health and nutrition of the population of United States.

The Act required:

- a program to achieve coordination of federal nutrition monitoring efforts within 10 years and assist states and local governments in participating in a nutrition monitoring network;
- an interagency board to develop and implement the program;
- an advisory council to provide scientific and technical advice and evaluate program effectiveness.

The Act also required that dietary guidelines be issued every five years, and that any dietary guidance issued by the federal government for the general public be reviewed by the Secretaries of both Agriculture, and Health and Human Services.
