= Title 7 of the Code of Federal Regulations =

US title on agriculture

CFR Title 7 – Agriculture is one of 50 titles comprising the United States Code of Federal Regulations (CFR) and contains the principal set of rules and regulations issued by federal agencies regarding agriculture. It is available in digital and printed form and can be referenced online using the Electronic Code of Federal Regulations (e-CFR).

== Structure ==
The table of contents, as reflected in the e-CFR updated May 2, 2022, is as follows:

Volume	Chapter	Parts	Regulatory Entity
1		0–26	Office of the Secretary of Agriculture
2	I	27–52	Agricultural Marketing Service (Standards, Inspections, Marketing Practices)
3		53–209	Agricultural Marketing Service (Standards, Inspections, Marketing Practices)
4	II	210–299	Food and Nutrition Service
5	III	300–399	Animal and Plant Health Inspection Service
6	IV	400–499	Federal Crop Insurance Corporation
	V	500–599	Agricultural Research Service
	VI	600–699	Natural Resources Conservation Service
7	VII	700–799	Farm Service Agency
	VIII	800–899	Grain Inspection, Packers and Stockyards Administration (Federal Grain Inspection Service)
8	IX	900–999	Agricultural Marketing Service (Marketing Agreements and Orders; Fruits, Vegetables, Nuts)
9	X	1000–1199	Agricultural Marketing Service (Marketing Agreements and Orders; Milk)
10	XI	1200–1299	Agricultural Marketing Service (Marketing Agreements and Orders; Misc. Commodities)
	XIV	1400–1499	Commodity Credit Corporation
	XV	1500–1599	Foreign Agricultural Service
11	XVI	1600–1699	Rural Telephone Bank
	XVII	1700–1759	Rural Utilities Service
12	XVII–XVIII	1760–1939	Rural Utilities Service, Rural Housing Service, Rural Business-Cooperative Service, Rural Utilities Service, and Farm Service Agency
13		1940–1949	Rural Utilities Service, Rural Housing Service, Rural Business-Cooperative Service, Rural Utilities Service, and Farm Service Agency
14		1950–1999	Rural Utilities Service, Rural Housing Service, Rural Business-Cooperative Service, Rural Utilities Service, and Farm Service Agency
15		2000–2099	Rural Utilities Service, Rural Housing Service, Rural Business-Cooperative Service, Rural Utilities Service, and Farm Service Agency
	XX	2200–2299	Local Television Loan Guarantee Board
	XXV	2500–2599	Office of Advocacy and Outreach, Department of Agriculture
	XXVI	2600–2699	Office of Inspector General
	XXVII	2700–2799	Office of Information Resources Management
	XXIII	2800–2899	Office of Operations
	XXIX	2900–2999	Office of Energy Policy and New Uses
	XXX	3000–3099	Office of the Chief Financial Officer
	XXXI	3100–3199	Office of Environmental Quality
	XXXII	3200–3299	Office of Procurement and Property Management
	XXXIII	3300–3399	Office of Transportation
	XXXIV	3400–3499	National Institute of Food and Agriculture
	XXXV	3500–3599	Rural Housing Service
	XXXVI	3600–3699	National Agricultural Statistics Service
	XXXVII	3700–3799	Economic Research Service
	XXXVIII	3800–3899	World Agricultural Outlook Board
	XLI		[Reserved]
	XLII	4200–4299	Rural Business-Cooperative Service and Rural Utilities Service
