= National Agricultural Research, Extension, and Teaching Policy Act of 1977 =

Law pertaining to the USDA

The United States National Agricultural Research, Extension, and Teaching Policy Act of 1977 — Title XIV of the 1977 farm bill (P.L. 95-113; 7 U.S.C. 3101 et seq.) -- made USDA the leading federal agency for agricultural research, extension, and teaching programs and consolidated the funding for these programs. This Act and other statutes relating to the research mission area are reauthorized every 4 to 7 years as part of omnibus legislation that provides funding authority and policy guidance for nearly all of USDA's agencies.
