= Section 22 of the Agricultural Adjustment Act =

Section 22, as referred to in shorthand, is a provision of permanent United States agricultural law (Agricultural Adjustment Act Amendment of 1935, P.L. 74-320) that allows the President to impose import fees or import quotas to prevent imports from non-WTO member countries from undermining the price support and supply control objectives of domestic farm programs.

Legislation implementing The North American Free Trade Agreement (NAFTA) and the Uruguay Round Agreement on Agriculture exempts NAFTA partners and WTO member countries from Section 22 quotas and fees. Under both trade agreements, the United States converted then-in-effect Section 22 restrictions into tariff-rate quotas. This effectively eliminates Section 22 as a tool to shield domestic price support operations.
