= Agricultural Marketing Service =

Agency of the United States Department of Agriculture

Agricultural Marketing Service (AMS)
- Agricultural Marketing Service Seal

Agency overview
- Formed: 1939; 87 years ago
- Jurisdiction: Under United States federal government, but operates worldwide
- Headquarters: Jamie L. Whitten Building, Washington, D.C. 38°53′17″N 77°1′48″W
- Employees: Approx. 4,000
- Annual budget: $3.693 billion (FY2021)
- Agency executives: Erin Morris, Administrator, AMS; Melissa Bailey, Associate Administrator
- Parent department: United States Department of Agriculture (USDA)
- Website: www.ams.usda.gov

The Agricultural Marketing Service (AMS) is an agency of the United States Department of Agriculture; it maintains programs in five commodity areas: cotton and tobacco; dairy; fruit and vegetable; livestock and seed; and poultry. These programs provide testing, standardization, grading and market news services for those commodities, and oversee marketing agreements and orders, administer research and promotion programs, and purchase commodities for federal food programs. The AMS enforces certain federal laws such as the Perishable Agricultural Commodities Act and the Federal Seed Act. The AMS budget is $1.2 billion. It is headquartered in the Jamie L. Whitten Building in Washington, D.C.

As of July 2021, AMS is led by Administrator Erin Morris.

== History ==
Established in 1939 by Agriculture Secretary Henry A. Wallace (later Vice President) through the merging and consolidation of various United States Department of Agriculture (USDA) bureaus and programs, the Agricultural Marketing Service (AMS) was tasked with facilitating fair and efficient marketing of American agricultural products, including food, fiber, and specialty crops both domestically and internationally.

Most functions of the new Service were later consolidated into the Agricultural Marketing Administration in 1942 before being shifted again several times in the 1940s and 1950s. The agency was once renamed back into the AMS from 1953 to 1965 before becoming the Consumer and Marketing Service. In April 1972, the current structure of the AMS was officially established under the Department of Agriculture. AMS also began enforcing parts of the 1990 Organic Foods Production Act. Over the decades, AMS grew to also support ranchers, importers, exporters, and other agriculture industry groups.

In 2017, Agriculture Secretary Sonny Perdue shifted several USDA offices, such as the Grain Inspection, Packers, and Stockyards Administration (GIPSA) and several program areas from the Farm Service Agency (FSA), into the Agricultural Marketing Service with the goal of better providing for farmers, ranchers, and producers while improving customer service and efficiency.

== Mission ==
AMS' primary function is to market American agricultural products inside and outside the United States. In addition to this, AMS also funds, administers, and supports agricultural research; grades and certifies the safety of agricultural products; and disseminates information and expertise in the agriculture and agriculture marking industries.

The Livestock and Poultry Program (L&P) supports federal food and nutrition programs like the National School Lunch Program (NSLP).

AMS also enforces the Perishable Agricultural Commodities Act (PACA), Federal Seed Act, Organic Foods Production Act, and Packers and Stockyards Act. The Warehouse and Commodity Management Division of the Fair Trade Practices Program administers United States Warehouse Act and Commodity Credit Corporation storage agreements.

== Organization ==
AMS is headed by the Office of the Administrator, Legislative and Regulatory Review Staff, Public Affairs Staff, and Administrative Management Staff.

AMS is divided into nine programs and one service which are further subdivided into divisions and staffs. AMS' nine programs are:

- Dairy Program
- Specialty Crops Program
- Fair Trade Practices Program
  - Food Disclosure and Labeling Division (FDLD)
  - Packers and Stockyards Division (PSD)
  - Perishable Agricultural Commodities Act Division (PACA)
  - Warehouse and Commodity Management Division (WCMD)
- National Organic Program (NOP)
- Cotton and Tobacco Program (C&T)
  - Grading Division
  - Standardization and Engineering Division
  - Quality Assurance Division
  - Market News Division
  - Research and Promotion Division
  - MRP Laboratory and Scientific IT Support Division
  - Administrative Staff
- Livestock and Poultry Program (L&P)
- Transportation and Marketing Program
  - Transportation Services Division
  - Grants Division
  - Marketing Services Division
  - USDA Farmers Market
- Science and Technology Program (S&T)
  - Laboratory Approval and Testing Division (LATD)
  - Monitoring Programs Division (MPD)
  - Plant Variety Protection Office (PVPO)
  - Seed Regulatory and Testing Division (SRTD)
- Commodity Procurement Program (CP)

The lone service of AMS is:

- Federal Grain Inspection Service (FGIS)

Additionally, AMS receives input and counsel from the Advisory Committee on Universal Cotton Standards, Fruit & Vegetable Industry Advisory Committee (FVIAC), Grain Inspection Advisory Committee, National Organic Standards Board (NOSB), and Plant Variety Protection Board.

== Programs ==
The AMS National Organic Program (NOP) develops, implements, and administers national production, handling, and labeling standards for organic agricultural products. The NOP also accredits the certifying agents (foreign and domestic) who inspect organic production and handling operations to certify that they meet USDA standards.

The AMS Science and Technology Program provides scientific support services to the agricultural community and AMS programs, including laboratory analyses, laboratory quality assurance, and coordination of scientific research conducted by other agencies for AMS. In addition, the program's Plant Variety Protection Office administers the Plant Variety Protection Act, by issuing Certificates of Protection for new varieties of plants which are sexually reproduced (by seed) or tuber-propagated. The program also conducts a program to collect and analyze data about pesticide residue levels in agricultural commodities. It also administers the Pesticide Recordkeeping program, which requires all certified private applicators of federally restricted-use pesticide to maintain records of all applications. The records will be put into a data base to help analyze agricultural pesticide use.

The AMS Transportation and Marketing Program supplies research and technical information regarding the nation's food transportation system to producers, producer groups, shippers, exporters, rural communities, carriers, government agencies and universities. The program also administers a program involving financial grants to States for marketing improvements. In addition, the division assists in the planning and design of marketing facilities, processes, and methods in cooperation with state and local governments, universities, farmer groups, and other segments of the U.S. food industry. This program is intended to enhance the overall effectiveness of the food marketing system, provide better quality products to the consumer at reasonable cost, improve market access for growers with farms of small to medium size, and promote regional economic development.

The Commodity Procurement Program purchases a variety of domestically produced and processed commodity food products to support American agriculture by encouraging the consumption of domestic foods. The program also manages the Web-Based Supply Chain Management (WBSCM), a fully integrated, web-based ordering and procurement system used for the purchase of USDA Foods. Foods purchased by the program are delivered to schools, food banks, and households in communities across the country as a component of our nation’s food safety net. The program's International Commodity Procurement Division, purchases and delivers US-produced food aid commodities to vulnerable populations in foreign countries.

The Dairy Program facilitates the efficient marketing of milk and dairy products. Key program activities include:

- Administering Federal Milk Marketing Orders and providing aggregated Federal Order Statistics.
- Helping the industry market U.S. dairy products worldwide by providing international programs and services, including export certification services.
- Providing buyers and sellers with an impartial evaluation of dairy equipment and product quality so businesses and consumers can buy with confidence through the Dairy Grading Program.
- Developing dairy grade standards used in the grading appraisal process.
- Providing timely and accurate market information on milk and dairy products through the Dairy Market News and Dairy Product Mandatory Reporting Program.
- Developing Dairy Economic Analysis for multiple Dairy Program, industry, and USDA needs.
- Overseeing The Fluid Milk Processor Promotion Program and the Dairy Research and Promotion Program.
- Providing information to assist dairy businesses in the production and processing of milk and dairy products
- Administering the Pandemic Market Volatility Assistance Program by reimbursing qualified dairy farmers for 80 percent of the revenue difference per month based on an annual production of up to 5 million pounds of milk marketed and on fluid milk sales from July through December 2020.
- Administering the Milk Donation Reimbursement Program by reimbursing milk processors for expenses related to donating milk to eligible distributing organizations, thereby reducing food waste and providing nutrition assistance to low-income individuals

The AMS administers the commodity checkoff programs.

== See also ==
- Title 7 of the Code of Federal Regulations
