= Additional peanuts =

In United States agricultural policy, additional peanuts (or additionals) refers to peanuts sold from a farm in any marketing year in excess of the amount of quota peanuts (see peanut poundage quota) sold from that farm. Additional peanuts must be exported or crushed into oil and meal. Additionals are eligible only for the lower of two price support levels available under the peanut price support program. The lower additionals loan rate is set to ensure that the Commodity Credit Corporation does not incur losses on their sale and disposal.

In setting this support level, USDA is also required to take into account the demand for peanut oil and meal, expected prices of other vegetable oils and protein meals, and the demand for peanuts in foreign markets. Under the FAIR Act of 1996, loans for additional peanuts remain available.
