= Federal Noxious Weed Act of 1974 =

United States legislation

- Long title: An Act to provide for the control and eradication of noxious weeds, and the regulation of the movement in interstate or foreign commerce of noxious weeds and potential carriers thereof, and for other purposes.
- Acronyms (colloquial): FNWA
- Enacted by: the 93rd United States Congress
- Effective: January 3, 1975

Citations
- Public law: 93-629
- Statutes at Large: 88 Stat. 2148

Codification
- Titles amended: 7 U.S.C.: Agriculture
- U.S.C. sections created: 7 U.S.C. ch. 61 § 2801 et seq.

Legislative history
- Introduced in the House as H.R. 11273 by Louis Frey, Jr. (R–FL) on November 6, 1973; Committee consideration by House Agriculture, Senate Agriculture and Forestry; Passed the House on December 18, 1973 (passed); Passed the Senate on December 11, 1974 (passed) with amendment; House agreed to Senate amendment on December 19, 1974 (agreed); Signed into law by President Gerald Ford on January 3, 1975

Major amendments
- Plant Protection Act

The Federal Noxious Weed Act of 1974 ("FNWA", Pub. L. 93–629, 88 Stat. 2148, enacted January 3, 1975) established a federal program to control the spread of noxious weeds. The United States Secretary of Agriculture was given the authority to declare plants "noxious weeds", and limit the interstate spread of such plants without a permit. The Secretary has the authority to inspect, seize, and destroy products, and quarantine areas, if necessary to contain, or limit the spread of such weeds.

== Amended in 1990 ==
The Act was amended by the 1990 Farm Bill on November 28, 1990. The amendment requires that each federal land-managing agency, including the Bureau of Land Management, the National Park Service, the U.S. Fish and Wildlife Service, and the U.S. Forest Service, do the following:

- Designate an office or person adequately trained in managing undesirable plant species to develop and coordinate a program to control such plants on the agency's land;
- Establish and adequately fund this plant management program through the agency's budget process;
- Complete and implement cooperative agreements (requirements for which are provided) with the States regarding undesirable plants on agency land; and
- Establish integrated management systems (as defined in the Act) to control or contain undesirable plants targeted under the cooperative agreements.

== Superseded in 2000 ==
The Act was superseded in 2000 by the Plant Protection Act (Pub. L. 106–224 (text) (PDF)) on June 20, 2000, except for the introductory section of the FNWA, and the amendment of 1990 (section 15, 7 U.S.C. § 2801 note and 7 U.S.C. § 2814).
