= Grain Inspection, Packers and Stockyards Administration =

Agency of the US Department of Agriculture

Agency overview
- Formed: 1994
- Preceding agencies: Packers and Stockyards Administration; Federal Grain Inspection Service
- Dissolved: 2017
- Superseding agency: Agricultural Marketing Service
- Parent agency: United States Department of Agriculture
- Website: http://www.gipsa.usda.gov/

The Grain Inspection, Packers and Stockyards Administration (GIPSA) was an agency of the United States Department of Agriculture that facilitates the marketing of livestock, poultry, meat, cereals, oilseeds, and related agricultural products, and promotes fair and competitive trading practices for the overall benefit of consumers and American agriculture. GIPSA was formed in 1994 through the joining of the Federal Grain Inspection Service and the Packers and Stockyards Administration.

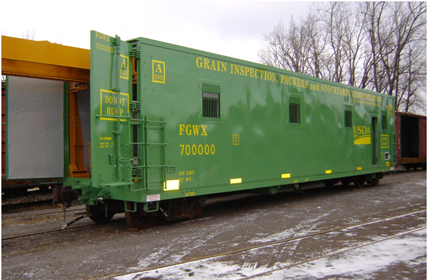
GIPSA’s unit FGWX700000, one of two railroad cars that replaced two 50 year old test car units

GIPSA was re-organized in 2017-18 to be part of USDA's Marketing and Regulatory Programs, which are working to ensure a productive and competitive global marketplace for U.S. agricultural products.

GIPSA's Federal Grain Inspection Service (FGIS) established the Official Standards for Grain, which are used each day by sellers and buyers to communicate the type and quality of grain bought and sold. FGIS also establishes standard testing methodologies to accurately and consistently measure grain quality. Finally, the program provides for the impartial application of these grades and standards through a network of federal, state, and private inspection agencies known as the official system. The Federal Grain Inspection Service (FGIS) was established by Congress in 1976 to manage the national grain inspection system, which was established in 1916, and to institute a national grain weighing program. The goal of creating a single federal grain inspection entity was to ensure development and maintenance of uniform U.S. standards, to develop inspection and weighing procedures for grain in domestic and export trade, and to facilitate grain marketing.

The Agency's Packers and Stockyards Programs (P&S) ensures open and competitive markets for livestock, meat, and poultry. P&S is a regulatory program whose roots are in providing financial protection, and ensuring fair and competitive markets. Today's Packers and Stockyards Program (P&S) is the progeny of the Packers and Stockyards Administration, which was established in 1921 under the Packers and Stockyards Act. The organization was instituted to regulate livestock marketing activities at public stockyards and the operations of meat packers and live poultry dealers.

In 2008, Congress passed legislation providing protection from retaliation under the Grain Inspection, Packers and Stockyards Administration (GIPSA) but each year language has been inserted into the Agriculture Appropriations bill blocking enforcement of those protections. Congresswoman Marcy Kaptur of Ohio and comedian John Oliver helped to remove the language blocking the enforcement of GIPSA in 2015.

In 2017, GIPSA was merged into the Agricultural Marketing Service.

== See also ==
- Title 7 of the Code of Federal Regulations
- Title 9 of the Code of Federal Regulations
