= Title VII of the Patriot Act =

Title VII: Increased information sharing for critical infrastructure protection is the seventh of ten titles which comprise the USA PATRIOT Act, an anti-terrorism bill passed in the United States after the September 11, 2001 attacks. Title VII has one section. The purpose of this title is to increase the ability of U.S. law enforcement to counter terrorist activity that crosses jurisdictional boundaries. It does this by amending the Omnibus Crime Control and Safe Streets Act of 1968.

This title allows the Director of the Bureau of Justice Assistance to "make grants and enter into contracts" with some groups to deal with terrorist organizations that cross jurisdictional boundaries. In addition, it gives the Bureau a budget with which to carry out these acts.

It consists of only one section, section 701, titled Expansion Of Regional Information Sharing System To Facilitate Federal-State-Local Law Enforcement Response Related To Terrorist Attacks. It modifies 42 U.S.C. § 3796h: Regional information sharing systems grants, which is part of the Omnibus Crime Control and Safe Streets Act of 1968. This code, as stated before the USA PATRIOT Act, allowed the Director of the Bureau of Justice Assistance (a division of the Justice Department) to "make grants and enter into contracts" with State, local criminal authorities, and non-profit organizations to stop criminal activities that cross jurisdictional boundaries.

The section adds "terrorist conspiracies and activities" to "criminal activities." It also adds to the list of items that grants and contacts may be made for "secure information sharing systems" to aid in "addressing multi-jurisdictional terrorist conspiracies and activities." It also gives the Bureau of Justice Assistance a budget to use in carrying out these sections in the amount of $50,000,000 for the 2002 fiscal year, and $100,000,000, for the 2003 fiscal year.
