= Perishable Agricultural Commodities Act of 1930 =

Perishable Agricultural Commodities Act, 1930
- Long title: An Act to suppress unfair and fraudulent practices in the marketing of perishable agricultural commodities in interstate and foreign commerce.
- Acronyms (colloquial): PACA
- Enacted by: the 71st United States Congress
- Effective: June 10, 1930

Citations
- Public law: Pub. L. 71–325
- Statutes at Large: 46 Stat. 531

Legislative history
- Introduced in the Senate as S. 108 on May 3, 1929; Committee consideration by Senate Agriculture, House Agriculture; Passed the Senate on June 3, 1929 (passed); Passed the House on May 14, 1930 (passed); Reported by the joint conference committee on May 16, 1930; agreed to by the House on June 3, 1930 (agreed) and by the Senate on June 3, 1930 (agreed); Signed into law by President Herbert Hoover on June 10, 1930

The Perishable Agricultural Commodities Act, 1930 (PACA), enacted 10 June 1930 and codified as Chapter 20A of Title 7 of the United States Code, is a law that authorizes the regulation of the buying and selling of fresh and frozen fruits and vegetables to prevent unfair trading practices and to assure that sellers will be paid promptly.

According to PACA, both produce sellers and buyers must pay fees for a license in order to do business, and these license fees are the source of funding for a trust program that resolves disputes and protects sellers from non-payment when buyers become bankrupt. Amendments to the Act in 1995 (Pub. L. 104–48 (text) (PDF), Sec. 3) include a 3-year phase out of the annual license fees for retailers and grocery wholesaler-dealers to be replaced by one-time fee. (7 U.S.C. § 499a et seq.).
