= Pesticide Data Program =

The Pesticide Data Program (PDP) is a program initiated in 1991 by the Agricultural Marketing Service division of the United States Department of Agriculture (USDA). The PDP is empowered to collect pesticide residue data on selected food commodities, primarily fruits and vegetables. PDP produces an annual summary; the last such summary for 2016 data was released in early 2018.

PDP data are used by the EPA to support its dietary risk assessment process and pesticide registration process, by the Food and Drug Administration to refine sampling for enforcement of tolerances; by the Foreign Agricultural Service, to support export of U.S. commodities in a competitive global market; by the Economic Research Service to evaluate pesticide alternatives; and by the public sector to address food safety issues.
