= Cotton Research and Promotion Act =

- Long title: An Act to enable cotton growers to establish, finance and carry out a coordinated program of research and promotion to improve the competitive position of, and, to expand markets for cotton.
- Acronyms (colloquial): CRPA
- Nicknames: Cotton Research and Promotion Act of 1966
- Enacted by: the 89th United States Congress
- Effective: July 13, 1966

Citations
- Public law: 89-502
- Statutes at Large: 80 Stat. 279

Codification
- Titles amended: 7 U.S.C.: Agriculture
- U.S.C. sections created: 7 U.S.C. ch. 53 § 2101 et seq.

Legislative history
- Introduced in the House as H.R. 12322 by Harold D. Cooley (D-NC) on March 1, 1966; Committee consideration by House Agriculture; Passed the House on March 3, 1966 (189-183); Passed the Senate on June 15, 1966 (49-20); Reported by the joint conference committee on June 16, 1966; agreed to by the Senate on June 28, 1966 (Agreed) and by the House on June 30, 1966 (Agreed); Signed into law by President Lyndon B. Johnson on July 13, 1966

The Cotton Research and Promotion Act (Pub. L. 89–502, 80 Stat. 279, enacted July 13, 1966) is an act passed by the United States Congress in 1966 in response to the declining market of cotton, in order to build consumer demand and "sell the story of American upland cotton". Cotton's share of the total retail and home furnishings market was 66 percent in the 1960s, but by 1975, that number had fallen to a record low of 34 percent.

A commercial advertising program began in 2002 especially targeted at women 18 to 34, with the slogan "The feel of cotton".
