= National Fluid Milk Processor Promotion Program =

The National Fluid Milk Processor Promotion Program was first authorized by the Fluid Milk Promotion Act of 1990 (7 U.S.C. 6401-6417) (Subtitle H of Title XIX of P.L. 101-624, called the Fluid Act). Fluid milk processors through a commodity checkoff program develop and finance generic advertising programs designed to maintain and expand markets and uses for fluid milk products produced in the United States. The mandatory national fluid milk program is financed by a 20¢ per hundredweight assessment on all fluid milk processed and marketed commercially in consumer-type packages (except by small processors). Fluid Milk Board annual revenue is approximately $110 million.

The program is administered by the National Fluid Milk Processor Promotion Board. It should not be confused with the dairy farmer funded Dairy Promotion Program. The program originally required periodic reauthorization by Congress. However, the 2002 farm bill (P.L. 107-171, Sec. 1506) gave the program permanent authority.
