= Title 7 of the United States Code =

U.S. federal statutes on agriculture

Title 7 of the United States Code outlines the role of agriculture in the United States Code.

== Chapters ==
- Chapter 1: Commodity Exchanges
- Chapter 2: Cotton Standards
- Chapter 3: Grain Standards
- Chapter 4: Naval Stores
- Chapter 5: Importation of Adulterated Seeds
- Chapter 6: Insecticides and Environmental Pesticide Control
- Chapter 6a: National Laboratory Accreditation
- Chapter 7: Insect Pests Generally
- Chapter 7a: Golden Nematode
- Chapter 7b: Plant Pests
- Chapter 8: Nursery Stock and Other Plants and Plant Products
- Chapter 8a: Rubber and Other Critical Agricultural Materials
- Chapter 9: Packers and Stockyards
- Chapter 10: Warehouses
- Chapter 11: Honeybees
- Chapter 12: Associations of Agricultural Products Producers
- Chapter 13: Agricultural and Mechanical Colleges
- Chapter 14: Agricultural Experiment Stations
- Chapter 15: Bureau of Animal Industry
- Chapter 16: Bureau of Dairy Industry
- Chapter 17: Miscellaneous Matters
- Chapter 18: Cooperative Marketing
- Chapter 19: Cotton Statistics and Estimates
- Chapter 20: Dumping or Destruction of Interstate Produce
- Chapter 20a: Perishable Agricultural Commodities
- Chapter 21: Tobacco Statistics
- Chapter 21a: Tobacco Inspection
- Chapter 21b: Tobacco Control
- Chapter 22: Agricultural Marketing
- Chapter 23: Foreign Agricultural Service
- Chapter 24: Perishable Agricultural Commodities
- Chapter 25: Export Standards for Apples
- Chapter 25a: Export Standards for Grapes and Plums
- Chapter 26: Agricultural Adjustment
- Chapter 26a: Agricultural Marketing Agreements
- Chapter 27: Cotton Marketing
- Chapter 28: Tobacco Industry
- Chapter 29: Potato Act of 1935
- Chapter 30: Anti-Hog-Cholera Serum and Hog-Cholera Virus
- Chapter 31: Rural Electrification and Telephone Service
- Chapter 31a: Telemedicine and Distance Learning Services in Rural Areas
- Chapter 32: Peanut Statistics
- Chapter 33: Farm Tenancy
- Chapter 34: Sugar Production and Control
- Chapter 35: Agricultural Adjustment Act of 1938
- Chapter 35a: Price Support of Agricultural Commodities
- Chapter 36: Crop Insurance
- Chapter 37: Seeds
- Chapter 38: Distribution and Marketing of Agricultural Products
- Chapter 39: Stabilization of International Wheat Market
- Chapter 40: Halogeton Glomeratus Control
- Chapter 41: Agricultural Trade Development and Assistance
- Chapter 42: Agricultural Commodity Set-Aside
- Chapter 43: Foreign Market Development
- Chapter 44: Wool Program
- Chapter 45: Soil Bank Program
- Chapter 46: Surplus Disposal of Agricultural Commodities
- Chapter 47: Interchange of Department of Agriculture and State Employees
- Chapter 48: Humane Methods of Livestock Slaughter
- Chapter 49: Consultation on Agricultural Programs
- Chapter 50: Agricultural Credit
- Chapter 51: Food Stamp Program
- Chapter 52: Farm Labor Contractor Registration
- Chapter 53: Cotton Research and Promotion
- Chapter 54: Transportation, Sale, and Handling of Certain Animals
- Chapter 55: Department of Agriculture
- Chapter 55a: Department of Agriculture Advisory Committees
- Chapter 56: Unfair Trade Practices Affecting Producers of Agricultural Products
- Chapter 57: Plant Variety Protection
- Chapter 58: Potato Research and Promotion
- Chapter 59: Rural Fire Protection, Development, and Small Farm Research and Education
- Chapter 60: Egg Research and Consumer Information
- Chapter 61: Noxious Weeds
- Chapter 62: Beef Research and Information
- Chapter 63: Farmer-To-Consumer Direct Marketing
- Chapter 64: Agricultural Research, Extension, and Teaching
- Chapter 65: Wheat and Wheat Foods Research and Nutrition Education
- Chapter 66: Agricultural Foreign Investment Disclosure
- Chapter 67: Implementation of International Sugar Agreement, 1977
- Chapter 68: Agricultural Subterminal Facilities
- Chapter 69: Swine Health Protection
- Chapter 70: Animal Cancer Research
- Chapter 71: Agricultural Trade Suspension Adjustment
- Chapter 72: National Agricultural Cost of Production Standards Review Board
- Chapter 73: Farmland Protection Policy
- Chapter 74: Floral Research and Consumer Information
- Chapter 75: International Carriage of Perishable Foodstuffs
- Chapter 76: Dairy Research and Promotion
- Chapter 77: Honey Research, Promotion, and Consumer Information
- Chapter 78: Agricultural Productivity Research
- Chapter 79: Pork Promotion, Research, and Consumer Information
- Chapter 80: Watermelon Research and Promotion
- Chapter 81: National Commission on Agriculture and Rural Development Policy
- Chapter 82: State Agricultural Loan Mediation Programs
- Chapter 83: Agricultural Competitiveness and Trade
- Chapter 84: National Nutrition Monitoring and Related Research
- Chapter 85: Administration of Environmental Programs
- Chapter 86: Water Quality Research, Education, and Coordination
- Chapter 87: Export Promotion
- Chapter 88: Research
- Chapter 89: Pecan Promotion and Research
- Chapter 90: Mushroom Promotion, Research, and Consumer Information
- Chapter 91: Lime Promotion, Research, and Consumer Information
- Chapter 92: Soybean Promotion, Research, and Consumer Information
- Chapter 93: Processor-Funded Milk Promotion Program
- Chapter 94: Organic Certification
- Chapter 95: Rural Revitalization Through Forestry
- Chapter 96: Global Climate Change
- Chapter 97: Fresh Cut Flowers and Fresh Cut Greens Promotion and Information
- Chapter 98: Department of Agriculture Reorganization
- Chapter 99: Sheep Promotion, Research, and Information
- Chapter 100: Agricultural Market Transition
- Chapter 101: Agricultural Promotion
- Chapter 102: Emergency Food Assistance
- Chapter 103: Agricultural Research, Extension, and Education Reform
- Chapter 104: Plant Protection
- Chapter 105: Hass Avocado Promotion, Research, and Information
- Chapter 106: Commodity Programs
- Chapter 107: Renewable Energy Research and Development
- Chapter 108: Tree Assistance Program
- Chapter 109: Animal Health Protection
- Chapter 109A: Control of Wild Animals
- Chapter 110: Enhancing Controls on Dangerous Biological Agents and Toxins
- Chapter 111: Brown Tree Snake Control and Eradication
- Chapter 112: Biomass Research and Development
- Chapter 113: Agricultural Commodity Support Programs
- Chapter 114: Agricultural Security
- Chapter 115: Agricultural Commodity Policy and Programs
- Chapter 116: National Bio and Agro-Defense Facility
