= Plant Protection Act =

United States legislation (2000)

Citations
- Public law: Pub. L. 106–224 (text) (PDF)
- Statutes at Large: 114 Stat. 438

Codification
- Titles amended: 7 U.S.C.: Agriculture
- U.S.C. sections created: 7 U.S.C. §§ 7701–7786
- U.S.C. sections amended: 7 U.S.C. ch. 104

Legislative history
- Introduced in the House as H.R. 2559 by Larry Combest (R–TX) on July 20, 1999; Committee consideration by House Committee on Agriculture; Passed the House on September 29, 1999 (Voice vote); Passed the Senate on March 23, 2000 (95-5); Signed into law by President Bill Clinton on June 20, 2000

United States Supreme Court cases
- Monsanto Co. v. Geertson Seed Farms, 561 U.S. 139 (2010).

The Plant Protection Act (PPA) (part of Pub. L. 106–224 (text) (PDF)) is a US statute relating to plant pests and noxious weeds introduced in 2000. It is currently codified at 7 U.S.C. 7701 et seq. It consolidates related responsibilities that were previously spread over various legislative statutes, including the Plant Quarantine Act, the Federal Plant Pest Act and the Federal Noxious Weed Act of 1974.

== Genetically modified plants ==
Quoted from the introductory paragraphs of Monsanto Co. v. Geertson Seed Farms:

The Plant Protection Act provides that the Secretary of the Department of Agriculture may issue regulations "to prevent the introduction of plant pests into the United States or the dissemination of plant pests within the United States." 7 U.S.C. §7711(a). Pursuant to that grant of authority, the Animal and Plant Health Inspection Service (APHIS) promulgated regulations that presume genetically engineered plants to be "plant pests"—and thus "regulated articles" under the PPA—until APHIS determines otherwise. However, any person may petition APHIS for a determination that a regulated article does not present a plant pest risk and therefore should not be subject to the applicable regulations. APHIS may grant such a petition in whole or in part.

In determining whether to grant nonregulated status to a genetically engineered plant variety, APHIS must comply with the National Environmental Policy Act of 1969 (NEPA), which requires federal agencies "to the fullest extent possible" to prepare a detailed environmental impact statement (EIS) for "every ... major Federal actio[n] significantly affecting the quality of the human environment." 42 U.S.C. §4332(2)(C). The agency need not complete an EIS if it finds, based on a shorter statement known as an environmental assessment (EA), that the proposed action will not have a significant environmental impact.

"Plant pest" is defined by CFR Title 7 §340.1 as "Any living stage (including active and dormant forms) of insects, mites, nematodes, slugs, snails, protozoa, or other invertebrate animals, bacteria, fungi, other parasitic plants or reproductive parts thereof; viruses; or any organisms similar to or allied with any of the foregoing; or any infectious agents or substances, which can directly or indirectly injure or cause disease or damage in or to any plants or parts thereof, or any processed, manufactured, or other products of plants." Thus, if genetic engineering techniques do not include introduction of such material and only include manipulation of the genomic material of the plant itself the modified organization may petition for determination of nonregulated status.

"§340.6 Petition for determination of nonregulated status.

(a) General. Any person may submit to the Administrator, a petition to seek a determination that an article should not be regulated under this part."

Not regulating plant varieties produced by such genetic editing is considered a loophole by some such as Michael Hansen, a senior scientist at Consumers Union.
