= List of United States federal legislation, 1901–2001 =

This is a chronological, but incomplete, list of United States federal legislation passed by the 57th through 106th United States Congresses, between 1901 and 2001. For the main article on this subject, see List of United States federal legislation. Additional lists are found at List of United States federal legislation: Congress of the Confederation, List of United States federal legislation, 1789–1901 and List of United States federal legislation, 2001–present.

== 57th United States Congress ==
- June 17, 1902: Newlands Reclamation Act, Sess. 1, ch. 1093, 32 Stat. 388
- June 28, 1902: Isthmian Canal Act (Panama Canal), Sess. 1, ch. 1302, 32 Stat. 481
- July 1, 1902: Philippine Organic Act (the basic law of the Insular Government), Sess. 1, ch. 1369, 32 Stat. 691
- January 21, 1903: Militia Act of 1903, Sess. 2, ch. 196, 32 Stat. 775
- February 11, 1903: Expediting Act, Sess. 2, ch. 544, 32 Stat. 823
- February 14, 1903: Department of Commerce and Labor Act, Sess. 2, ch. 552, 32 Stat. 825
- February 19, 1903: Elkins Act, Sess. 2, ch. 708, 32 Stat. 847
- March 3, 1903: Immigration Act of 1903 (including §39, the Anarchist Exclusion Act), Sess. 2, ch. 1012, 32 Stat. 1213

== 58th United States Congress ==
- April 28, 1904: Kinkaid Act, Sess. 1, ch. 1801, 33 Stat. 547
- February 1, 1905: Transfer Act of 1905, Sess. 3, ch. 288, 33 Stat. 628

== 59th United States Congress ==
- May 8, 1906: Burke Act, Sess. 1, ch. 2348, 34 Stat. 182
- June 1, 1906: Federal Employers Liability Act, Sess. 1, ch. 3073
- June 8, 1906: Antiquities Act (National Monument Act), Sess. 1, ch. 3060, 34 Stat. 225
- June 16, 1906: Oklahoma Enabling Act, Sess. 1, ch. 3335, 34 Stat. 267
- June 29, 1906: Hepburn Act, Sess. 1, ch. 3591, 34 Stat. 584
- June 30, 1906: Federal Meat Inspection Act, Sess. 1, ch. 3913, 34 Stat. 674
- June 30, 1906: Pure Food and Drug Act, Sess. 1, ch. 3915, 34 Stat. 768
- January 26, 1907: Tillman Act of 1907, Sess. 2, ch. 420, 34 Stat. 864
- February 20, 1907: Immigration Act of 1907, Sess. 2, ch. 1134, 34 Stat. 898
- March 2, 1907: Expatriation Act of 1907, Sess. 2, ch. 2534, 34 Stat. 1228

== 60th United States Congress ==
- April 22, 1908: Federal Employers Liability Act, Pub. L. 60–100, 35 Stat. 65
- May 30, 1908: Aldrich–Vreeland Act, Pub. L. 60–169, 35 Stat. 546
- March 4, 1909: Copyright Act of 1909, Pub. L. 60–349, 35 Stat. 1075

== 61st United States Congress ==
- August 5, 1909: Payne–Aldrich Tariff Act, Pub. L. 61–5, 36 Stat. 11
- April 26, 1910: Federal Insecticide, Fungicide, and Rodenticide Act, Pub. L. 61–152, 36 Stat. 331
- June 18, 1910: Mann–Elkins Act, Pub. L. 61–218, 36 Stat. 539
- June 25, 1910: Federal Corrupt Practices Act, Pub. L. 61–274, 36 Stat. 822
- June 25, 1910: Mann Act, Pub. L. 61–277, 36 Stat. 825
- March 3, 1911: Defense Secrets Act of 1911, Pub. L. 61–470, 36 Stat. 1084

== 62nd United States Congress ==
- August 8, 1911: Apportionment Act of 1911, Pub. L. 62–5, 37 Stat. 13
- May 11, 1912: Sherwood Act, Pub. L. 62–155, 37 Stat. 112
- August 13, 1912: Radio Act of 1912, Pub. L. 62–264, 37 Stat. 302
- August 20, 1912: Plant Quarantine Act, Pub. L. 62–275, 37 Stat. 315
- August 24, 1912: Lloyd–La Follette Act, Pub. L. 62–336, §6, 37 Stat. 555
- March 4, 1913: Labor Department Act, Pub. L. 62–426, 37 Stat. 736
- March 4, 1913: Virus-Serum-Toxin Act, Pub. L. 62–430, 37 Stat. 828

== 63rd United States Congress ==
- July 15, 1913: Newlands Labor Act, Pub. L. 63–6, 38 Stat. 103
- October 3, 1913: Revenue Act of 1913, Pub. L. 63–16, 38 Stat. 114 (including Underwood Tariff)
- December 23, 1913: Federal Reserve Act, Pub. L. 63–43, 38 Stat. 251
- May 8, 1914: Smith–Lever Act of 1914, Pub. L. 63–95, 38 Stat. 372
- August 18, 1914: Cotton Futures Act, Pub. L. 63–174, 38 Stat. 693
- September 2, 1914: War Risk Insurance Act, Pub. L. 63–193, 38 Stat. 711
- September 26, 1914: Federal Trade Commission Act of 1914, Pub. L. 63–203, 38 Stat. 717
- October 15, 1914: Clayton Antitrust Act of 1914, Pub. L. 63–212, 38 Stat. 730
- December 17, 1914: Harrison Narcotics Tax Act, Pub. L. 63–223, 38 Stat. 785
- January 28, 1915: Coast Guard Act, Pub. L. 63–239, 38 Stat. 800
- March 4, 1915: Seamen's Act, Pub. L. 63–302, 38 Stat. 1164

== 64th United States Congress ==
- June 3, 1916: National Defense Act of 1916, Pub. L. 64–85, 39 Stat. 166
- July 11, 1916: Federal Aid Road Act of 1916, Pub. L. 64–156, 39 Stat. 355
- July 17, 1916: Federal Farm Loan Act, Pub. L. 64–158, 39 Stat. 360
- August 11, 1916: Cotton Futures Act of 1916, Pub. L. 64–190, 39 Stat. 476
- August 25, 1916: National Park Service Organic Act, Pub. L. 64–235, 39 Stat. 535
- August 29, 1916: Jones Law (Philippines), reorganized the Insular Government of the Philippine Islands, including establishing the elected Senate and renaming the House.
- September 1, 1916: Keating–Owen Child Labor Act, Pub. L. 64–249, 39 Stat. 675
- September 3, 1916: Adamson Act, Pub. L. 64–252, 39 Stat. 721
- September 7, 1916: Merchant Marine Act of 1916 (Alexander Act), Pub. L. 64–260, 39 Stat. 728
- September 7, 1916: Federal Employees' Compensation Act, Pub. L. 64–267, 39 Stat. 750
- September 8, 1916: Revenue Act of 1916, Pub. L. 64–271, 39 Stat. 756
- December 29, 1916: Stock-Raising Homestead Act, Pub. L. 64–290, 39 Stat. 862
- February 5, 1917: Immigration Act of 1917 (Barred Zone Act), Pub. L. 64–301, 39 Stat. 874
- February 23, 1917: Smith–Hughes Act, Pub. L. 64–347, 39 Stat. 929
- March 1, 1917: Flood Control Act of 1917, Pub. L. 64–367, 39 Stat. 948
- March 2, 1917: Jones–Shafroth Act, Pub. L. 64–368, 39 Stat. 951

== 65th United States Congress ==
- April 24, 1917: First Liberty Bond Act, Pub. L. 65–3, 40 Stat. 35
- May 12, 1917: First Army Appropriations Act of 1917, Pub. L. 65–11, 40 Stat. 40
- May 12, 1917: Enemy Vessel Confiscation Joint Resolution, Pub. Res. 65-2, 40 Stat. 75
- May 18, 1917: Selective Service Act of 1917, Pub. L. 65–12, 40 Stat. 76
- May 29, 1917: Esch Car Service Act of 1917, Pub. L. 65–19, 40 Stat. 101
- June 15, 1917: Emergency Shipping Fund Act of 1917, Pub. L. 65–23, 40 Stat. 182
- June 15, 1917: Second Army Appropriations Act of 1917, Pub. L. 65–23, 40 Stat. 188
- June 15, 1917: Espionage Act of 1917, Pub. L. 65–24, 40 Stat. 217
- June 15, 1917: Search Warrant Act of 1917, Pub. L. 65–24, Title XI, 40 Stat. 228
- August 8, 1917: River and Harbor Act of 1917, Pub. L. 65–37, 40 Stat. 250
- August 10, 1917: Priority of Shipments Act of 1917, Pub. L. 65–39, 40 Stat. 272
- August 10, 1917: Obstruction of Interstate Commerce Act of 1917, Pub. L. 65–39, 40 Stat. 272
- August 10, 1917: Food and Fuel Control Act (Lever Act), Pub. L. 65–41, 40 Stat. 276
- October 1, 1917: Second Liberty Bond Act, Pub. L. 65–43, 40 Stat. 288
- October 1, 1917: Aircraft Board Act of 1917, Pub. L. 65–48, 40 Stat. 296
- October 3, 1917: War Revenue Act of 1917, Pub. L. 65–50, 40 Stat. 300
- October 5, 1917: Repatriation Act of 1917, Pub. L. 65–55, 40 Stat. 340
- October 6, 1917: Explosives Act of 1917, Pub. L. 65–68, 40 Stat. 385
- October 6, 1917: War Risk Insurance Act of 1917, Pub. L. 65–90, 40 Stat. 398
- October 6, 1917: Trading with the Enemy Act of 1917, Pub. L. 65–91, 40 Stat. 411
- March 8, 1918: Soldiers' and Sailors' Civil Relief Act, Pub. L. 65–103, 40 Stat. 440
- March 19, 1918: Standard Time Act (Calder Act), Pub. L. 65–106, 40 Stat. 450
- March 21, 1918: Federal Control Act of 1918, Pub. L. 65–107, 40 Stat. 451
- April 4, 1918: Third Liberty Bond Act, Pub. L. 65–120, 40 Stat. 502
- April 5, 1918: War Finance Corporation Act, Pub. L. 65–121, 40 Stat. 506
- April 10, 1918: Webb–Pomerene Act, Pub. L. 65–126, 40 Stat. 516
- April 18, 1918: American Forces Abroad Indemnity Act, Pub. L. 65–133, 40 Stat. 532
- April 20, 1918: Destruction of War Materials Act, Pub. L. 65–135, 40 Stat. 533
- April 23, 1918: Pittman Act, Pub. L. 65–139, 40 Stat. 535
- May 9, 1918: Alien Naturalization Act, Pub. L. 65–144, 40 Stat. 542
- May 16, 1918: Housing Act, Pub. L. 65–149, 40 Stat. 550
- May 16, 1918: Sedition Act of 1918, Pub. L. 65–150, 40 Stat. 553
- May 20, 1918: Departmental Reorganization Act (Overman Act), Pub. L. 65–152, 40 Stat. 556
- May 22, 1918: Passport Control Act (Entry and Departure Controls Act), Pub. L. 65–154, 40 Stat. 559
- May 31, 1918: Saulsbury Resolution, Pub. Res. 65-31, 40 Stat. 593
- June 27, 1918: Vocational Rehabilitation Act (Smith-Sears Act), Pub. L. 65–178, 40 Stat. 617
- July 3, 1918: Migratory Bird Treaty Act of 1918, Pub. L. 65–186, 40 Stat. 755
- July 9, 1918: Fourth Liberty Bond Act, Pub. L. 65–192, 40 Stat. 844
- July 9, 1918: Army Appropriations Act of 1918, Pub. L. 65–193, 40 Stat. 845
- July 9, 1918: Chamberlain–Kahn Act (Public Health and Research Act of 1918), Pub. L. 65–193, 40 Stat. 845
- July 18, 1918: River and Harbor Act of 1918, Pub. L. 65–200, 40 Stat. 904
- July 18, 1918: Charter Rate and Requisition Act of 1918, Pub. L. 65–202, 40 Stat. 913
- October 16, 1918: Immigration Act of 1918 (Dillingham–Hardwick Act), Pub. L. 65–221, 40 Stat. 1012
- October 16, 1918: Corrupt Practices Act of 1918 (Gerry Act), Pub. L. 65–222, 40 Stat. 1013
- November 7, 1918: National Bank Consolidation Act of 1918, Pub. L. 65–240, 40 Stat. 1043
- November 21, 1918: Food Production Stimulation Act (War-Time Prohibition Act), Pub. L. 65–243, 40 Stat. 1045
- February 24, 1919: Revenue Act of 1918, Pub. L. 65–254, 40 Stat. 1057
- February 24, 1919: Child Labor Act of 1919, Pub. L. 65–254, Title XII, 40 Stat. 1138
- February 26, 1919: Grand Canyon Park Act of 1919, Pub. L. 65–277, 40 Stat. 1175
- February 26, 1919: Acadia National Park Act of 1919, Pub. L. 65–278, 40 Stat. 1178
- March 2, 1919: War Risk Insurance Act of 1919 (War Minerals Relief Act of 1919, Dent Act), Pub. L. 65–322, 40 Stat. 1272
- March 2, 1919: River and Harbors Act of 1919, Pub. L. 65–323, 40 Stat. 1275
- March 3, 1919: Hospitalization Act of 1919, Pub. L. 65–326, 40 Stat. 1302
- March 3, 1919: Fifth Liberty Bond Act, Pub. L. 65–328, 40 Stat. 1309
- March 4, 1919: Wheat Price Guarantee Act, Pub. L. 65–348, 40 Stat. 1348

== 66th United States Congress ==
- October 18, 1919: National Prohibition Act (Volstead Act), Pub. L. 66–66, 41 Stat. 305
- February 25, 1920: Mineral Leasing Act of 1920, Pub. L. 66–146, 41 Stat. 437
- February 28, 1920: Esch–Cummins Act, Pub. L. 66–152, 41 Stat. 456
- June 4, 1920: National Defense Act of 1920, Pub. L. 66–242, 41 Stat. 759
- June 5, 1920: Merchant Marine Act of 1920, Pub. L. 66–261, 41 Stat. 988
- June 10, 1920: Federal Water Power Act, Pub. L. 66–280, 41 Stat. 1063

== 67th United States Congress ==
- May 19, 1921: Emergency Quota Act (Johnson Quota Act), Pub. L. 67–5, 42 Stat. 5
- May 27, 1921: Emergency Tariff of 1921, Pub. L. 67–10, 42 Stat. 9
- June 10, 1921: Budget and Accounting Act, Pub. L. 67–13, 42 Stat. 20
- June 10, 1921: Willis Graham Act, Pub. L. 67–15, 42 Stat. 27
- August 15, 1921: Packers and Stockyards Act, Pub. L. 67–51, 42 Stat. 159
- August 24, 1921: Future Trading Act, Pub. L. 67–66, 42 Stat. 187
- November 9, 1921: Federal Aid Highway Act of 1921, Pub. L. 67–87, 42 Stat. 212
- November 23, 1921: Sheppard–Towner Act, Pub. L. 67–97, 42 Stat. 224
- November 23, 1921: Revenue Act of 1921, Pub. L. 67–98, 42 Stat. 227
- December 22, 1921: Russian Famine Relief Act, Pub. L. 67–117, 42 Stat. 351
- February 18, 1922: Capper–Volstead Act, Pub. L. 67–146, 42 Stat. 388
- February 18, 1922: Patent Act of 1922, Pub. L. 67–147, 42 Stat. 389
- May 26, 1922: Narcotic Drugs Import and Export Act (Jones–Miller Act), Pub. L. 67–227, 42 Stat. 596
- September 21, 1922: Fordney–McCumber Tariff, Pub. L. 67–318, 42 Stat. 858
- September 21, 1922: Grain Futures Act, Pub. L. 67–331, 42 Stat. 998
- September 22, 1922: Cable Act (Married Women's Citizenship Act), Pub. L. 67–346, 42 Stat. 1021
- March 4, 1923: Agricultural Credits Act of 1923, Pub. L. 67–503, 42 Stat. 1454

== 68th United States Congress ==
- September 22, 1923: U.S. Coal Commission Act
- April 26, 1924: Seed and Feed Loan Act, Pub. Res. 68-13, 43 Stat. 110
- May 19, 1924: World War Adjusted Compensation Act (Bonus Bill), Pub. L. 68–120, 43 Stat. 121
- May 24, 1924: Rogers Act, Pub. L. 68–135, 43 Stat. 140
- May 26, 1924: Immigration Act of 1924 (Johnson–Reed Act), Pub. L. 68–139, 43 Stat. 153
- May 29, 1924: Indian Oil Leasing Act of 1924 (Lenroot Act), Pub. L. 68–158, 43 Stat. 244
- June 2, 1924: Indian Citizenship Act (Snyder Act), Pub. L. 68–175, 43 Stat. 253
- June 2, 1924: Revenue Act of 1924 (Simmons–Longworth Act), Pub. L. 68–176, 43 Stat. 253
- June 3, 1924: Inland Waterways Act of 1924 (Denison Act), Pub. L. 68–185, 43 Stat. 360
- June 7, 1924: Oil Pollution Act of 1924, Pub. L. 68–238, 43 Stat. 604
- June 7, 1924: Pueblo Lands Act of 1924, Pub. L. 68–253, 43 Stat. 636
- June 7, 1924: Clarke–McNary Act, Pub. L. 68–270, 43 Stat. 653
- June 7, 1924: Anti-Heroin Act of 1924, Pub. L. 68–274, 43 Stat. 657
- January 30, 1925: Hoch-Smith Resolution
- January 31, 1925: Special Duties Act
- February 2, 1925: Air Mail Act of 1925 (Kelly Act), Pub. L. 68–359, 43 Stat. 805
- February 12, 1925: Federal Arbitration Act, Pub. L. 68–401, 43 Stat. 883
- February 13, 1925: Judiciary Act of 1925, Pub. L. 68–415, 43 Stat. 936
- February 16, 1925: Home Port Act of 1925, Pub. L. 68–420, 43 Stat. 947
- February 24, 1925: Purnell Act
- February 27, 1925: Temple Act
- February 28, 1925: Classification Act of 1925, Pub. L. 68–506, 43 Stat. 1053
- March 3, 1925: Helium Act of 1925, Pub. L. 68–544, 43 Stat. 1110
- March 3, 1925: River and Harbors Act of 1925, Pub. L. 68–585, 43 Stat. 1186
- March 3, 1925: Mount Rushmore National Memorial Act (Norbeck–Williamson Act), Pub. L. 68–589, 43 Stat. 1214
- March 4, 1925: Probation Act of 1925, Pub. L. 68–596, 43 Stat. 1259
- March 4, 1925: Establishment of the United States Navy Band, Pub. L. 68–611, 43 Stat. 1275

== 69th United States Congress ==
- February 26, 1926: Revenue Act of 1926, Pub. L. 69–20, 44 Stat. 9
- May 20, 1926: Railway Labor Act, Pub. L. 69–257, 44 Stat. 577
- May 25, 1926: Public Buildings Act, Pub. L. 69–281, 44 Stat. 630
- February 23, 1927: Radio Act of 1927, Pub. L. 69–632, 44 Stat. 1162

== 70th United States Congress ==
- March 10, 1928: Settlement of War Claims Act of 1928, Pub. L. 70–122, 45 Stat. 254
- May 15, 1928: Flood Control Act of 1928 (Jones–Reid Act), Pub. L. 70–391, 45 Stat. 534
- May 22, 1928: Merchant Marine Act of 1928 (Jones–White Act), Pub. L. 70–463, 45 Stat. 689
- May 22, 1928: Forest Research Act (McSweeney–McNary Act)
- May 22, 1928: Capper–Ketcham Act, Pub. L. 70–475, 45 Stat. 711
- May 28, 1928: Welsh Act
- May 29, 1928: Revenue Act of 1928, Pub. L. 70–562, 45 Stat. 791
- May 29, 1928: Reed–Jenkins Act, Pub. L. 70–574, 45 Stat. 954
- December 21, 1928: Boulder Canyon Project Act (Hoover Dam), Pub. L. 70–642, 45 Stat. 1057
- December 22, 1928: Color of Title Act
- January 19, 1929: Hawes–Cooper Act
- January 19, 1929: Narcotic Farms Act of 1929, Pub. L. 70–672, 45 Stat. 1085
- February 13, 1929: Cruiser Act, Pub. L. 70–726, 45 Stat. 1165
- February 18, 1929: Migratory Bird Conservation Act (Norbeck–Anderson Act), Pub. L. 70–770, 45 Stat. 1222
- March 2, 1929: Increased Penalties Act (Jones–Stalker Act), Pub. L. 70–899, 45 Stat. 1446

== 71st United States Congress ==
- June 15, 1929: Agricultural Marketing Act of 1929, Pub. L. 71–10, 46 Stat. 11
- June 18, 1929: Reapportionment Act of 1929, Pub. L. 71–13, 46 Stat. 21
- May 26, 1930: Ransdell Act, Pub. L. 71–251, 46 Stat. 379
- June 10, 1930: Perishable Agricultural Commodities Act of 1930, Pub. L. 71–325, 46 Stat. 531
- June 17, 1930: Smoot–Hawley Tariff Act, Pub. L. 71–361, 46 Stat. 590, (including Plant Patent Act)
- March 3, 1931: Davis–Bacon Act of 1931, Pub. L. 71–798, 46 Stat. 1494

== 72nd United States Congress ==
- January 22, 1932: Reconstruction Finance Corporation Act, Pub. L. 72–2, 47 Stat. 5
- February 27, 1932: Banking Act of 1932 (Glass–Steagall Act of 1932), Pub. L. 72–44, 47 Stat. 56
- March 23, 1932: Norris–La Guardia Act, Pub. L. 72–65, 47 Stat. 70
- June 6, 1932: Revenue Act of 1932, Pub. L. 72–154, 47 Stat. 169
- June 22, 1932: Federal Kidnapping Act, Pub. L. 72–189, 47 Stat. 326
- July 21, 1932: Emergency Relief and Construction Act, Pub. L. 72–302, 47 Stat. 709
- July 22, 1932: Federal Home Loan Bank Act, Pub. L. 72–304, 47 Stat. 725
- February 20, 1933: Blaine Act
- March 3, 1933: Buy American Act, Pub. L. 72–428, Title III, 47 Stat. 1520

== 73rd United States Congress ==
- March 9, 1933: Emergency Banking Act, Pub. L. 73–1, 48 Stat. 1
- March 20, 1933: Economy Act of March 20, 1933, Pub. L. 73–2, 48 Stat. 8
- March 22, 1933: Cullen–Harrison Act, Pub. L. 73–3, 48 Stat. 16
- March 31, 1933: Civilian Conservation Corps Reforestation Relief Act, Pub. L. 73–5, 48 Stat. 22
- May 12, 1933: Agricultural Adjustment Act, Pub. L. 73–10, 48 Stat. 31
- May 12, 1933: Federal Emergency Relief Act, Pub. L. 73–15, 48 Stat. 55
- May 18, 1933: Tennessee Valley Authority Act, Pub. L. 73–17, 48 Stat. 58
- May 27, 1933: Securities Act of 1933, Pub. L. 73–22, 48 Stat. 74
- June 13, 1933: Homeowners Refinancing Act, Pub. L. 73–43, 48 Stat. 128
- June 16, 1933: Glass–Steagall Act of 1933 (Banking Act of 1933), Pub. L. 73–66, 48 Stat. 162
- June 16, 1933: National Industrial Recovery Act of 1933, Pub. L. 73–67, 48 Stat. 195
- June 16, 1933: Farm Credit Act of 1933, Pub. L. 73–75, 48 Stat. 257
- January 30, 1934: Gold Reserve Act, Pub. L. 73–87, 48 Stat. 337
- March 24, 1934: Tydings–McDuffie Act (Philippine Independence Act), Pub. L. 73–127, 48 Stat. 456
- March 27, 1934: Vinson–Trammell Act, Pub. L. 73–135, 48 Stat. 503
- March 27, 1934: Emergency Air Mail Act, Pub. L. 73–140, 48 Stat. 508
- April 7, 1934: Jones-Connally Act 1934, Pub. L. 73–142, 48 Stat. 528
- April 13, 1934: Johnson Act, Pub. L. 73–151, 48 Stat. 574
- May 10, 1934: Revenue Act of 1934, Pub. L. 73–216, 48 Stat. 680
- June 6, 1934: Securities Exchange Act of 1934, Pub. L. 73–291, 48 Stat. 881
- June 12, 1934: Reciprocal Tariff Act, Pub. L. 73–316, 48 Stat. 943
- June 18, 1934: Indian Reorganization Act, Pub. L. 73–383, 48 Stat. 984
- June 19, 1934: Rules Enabling Act, Pub. L. 73–415, 48 Stat. 1064
- June 19, 1934: Communications Act of 1934, Pub. L. 73–416, 48 Stat. 1064
- June 19, 1934: National Archives Act, Pub. L. 73–432, 48 Stat. 1122
- June 26, 1934: Federal Credit Union Act, Pub. L. 73–467, 48 Stat. 1216
- June 26, 1934: National Firearms Act, Pub. L. 73–474, 48 Stat. 1236
- June 27, 1934: National Housing Act of 1934, Pub. L. 73–479, 48 Stat. 1246
- June 28, 1934: Taylor Grazing Act of 1934, Pub. L. 73–482, 48 Stat. 1269
- June 28, 1934: Frazier–Lemke Farm Bankruptcy Act, Pub. L. 73–486, 48 Stat. 1289

== 74th United States Congress ==
- February 22, 1935: Connally Hot Oil Act of 1935, Pub. L. 74–14, 49 Stat. 30
- June 29, 1935: Bankhead–Jones Act of 1935, Pub. L. 74–182, 49 Stat. 436
- July 5, 1935: National Labor Relations Act of 1935 (Wagner Act), Pub. L. 74–198, 49 Stat. 449
- August 9, 1935: Motor Carrier Act, Pub. L. 74–255, 49 Stat. 543 (renamed part II of the Interstate Commerce Act)
- August 14, 1935: Social Security Act, Pub. L. 74–271, 49 Stat. 620 (including Aid to Dependent Children, Old Age Pension Act)
- August 23, 1935: Banking Act of 1935, Pub. L. 74–305, 49 Stat. 684
- August 24, 1935: Agricultural Adjustment Act Amendment of 1935, Pub. L. 74–320, 49 Stat. 750
- August 26, 1935: Public Utility Act, Pub. L. 74–333, 49 Stat. 803 (including: Public Utility Holding Company Act of 1935, Federal Power Act)
- August 30, 1935: Revenue Act of 1935, Pub. L. 74–407, 49 Stat. 1014
- August 31, 1935: Neutrality Act of 1935, Pub. Res. 74-67, 49 Stat. 1081
- January 27, 1936: Adjusted Compensation Payment Act, Pub. L. 74–425, 49 Stat. 1099
- February 29, 1936: Soil Conservation and Domestic Allotment Act of 1936, Pub. L. 74–461, 49 Stat. 1148
- February 29, 1936: Neutrality Act of 1936, Pub. Res. 74-74, 49 Stat. 1152
- May 20, 1936: Rural Electrification Act, Pub. L. 74–605, 49 Stat. 1363
- June 15, 1936: Commodity Exchange Act, Pub. L. 74–675, 49 Stat. 1491
- June 19, 1936: Robinson–Patman Act, Pub. L. 74–692, 49 Stat. 1526
- June 22, 1936: Flood Control Act of 1936, Pub. L. 74–738, 49 Stat. 1570
- June 22, 1936: Revenue Act of 1936, Pub. L. 74–740, 49 Stat. 1648
- June 29, 1936: Merchant Marine Act of 1936, Pub. L. 74–835, 49 Stat. 1985
- June 30, 1936: Walsh–Healey Public Contracts Act, Pub. L. 74–846, 49 Stat. 2036

== 75th United States Congress ==
- May 1, 1937: Neutrality Act of 1937, Pub. Res. 75-27, 50 Stat. 121
- June 3, 1937: Agricultural Marketing Agreement Act of 1937, Pub. L. 75–137, 50 Stat. 246
- July 22, 1937: Bankhead–Jones Farm Tenant Act of 1937, Pub. L. 75–210, 50 Stat. 522
- August 2, 1937: Marijuana Tax Act of 1937, Pub. L. 75–238, 50 Stat. 551
- August 5, 1937: National Cancer Institute Act, Pub. L. 75–244, 50 Stat. 559
- August 17, 1937: Miller–Tydings Act, Pub. L. 75–314, Title VIII, 50 Stat. 693
- August 28, 1937: Flood Control Act of 1937, Pub. L. 75–406, 50 Stat. 876
- September 1, 1937: Housing Act of 1937, Pub. L. 75–412, 50 Stat. 888
- September 2, 1937: Pittman–Robertson Federal Aid in Wildlife Restoration Act, Pub. L. 75–415, 50 Stat. 917
- February 3, 1938: National Housing Act Amendments of 1938, Pub. L. 75–424, 52 Stat. 8
- February 16, 1938: Agricultural Adjustment Act of 1938, Pub. L. 75–430, 52 Stat. 31
- March 21, 1938: Wheeler–Lea Act, Pub. L. 75–447, 52 Stat. 111
- May 11, 1938: Indian Mineral Leasing Act, 52 Stat. 347
- May 17, 1938: Naval Act of 1938, Pub. L. 75–528, 52 Stat. 401
- May 24, 1938: La Follette–Bulwinkle Act, Pub. L. 75–540, 52 Stat. 439
- June 8, 1938: Foreign Agents Registration Act, Pub. L. 75–583, 52 Stat. 631
- June 21, 1938: Natural Gas Act of 1938, Pub. L. 75–688, 52 Stat. 821
- June 22, 1938: Bankruptcy Act of 1938, Pub. L. 75–696, 52 Stat. 840
- June 25, 1938: Civil Aeronautics Act, Pub. L. 75–706, 52 Stat. 973
- June 25, 1938: Federal Food, Drug, and Cosmetic Act, Pub. L. 75–717, 52 Stat. 1040
- June 25, 1938: Fair Labor Standards Act of 1938, Pub. L. 75–718, 52 Stat. 1060
- June 28, 1938: Flood Control Act of 1938, Pub. L. 75–761, 52 Stat. 1215
- June 30, 1938: Federal Firearms Act of 1938, Pub. L. 75–785, 52 Stat. 1250

== 76th United States Congress ==
- April 3, 1939: Reorganization Act of 1939, Pub. L. 76–19, 53 Stat. 561
- August 2, 1939: Hatch Act of 1939, Pub. L. 76–252, 53 Stat. 1147
- August 9, 1939: Federal Seed Act, Pub. L. 76–354, 53 Stat. 1275
- August 11, 1939: Flood Control Act of 1939, Pub. L. 76–396, 53 Stat. 1414
- November 4, 1939: Neutrality Act of 1939, ("Cash and Carry Act"), Pub. Res. 76-54, 54 Stat. 4
- June 25, 1940: Revenue Act of 1940, Pub. L. 76–656, 54 Stat. 516
- June 28, 1940: Alien Registration Act (Smith Act), Pub. L. 76–670, 54 Stat. 670
- July 19, 1940: Two-Ocean Navy Act ("Vinson-Wash Act"), Pub. L. 76–757, 54 Stat. 779
- August 22, 1940: Act of August 22, 1940, Pub. L. 76–768, 54 Stat. 789 (including Investment Company Act of 1940, Investment Advisers Act of 1940)
- September 16, 1940: Selective Training and Service Act of 1940, Pub. L. 76–783, 54 Stat. 885
- October 8, 1940: Second Revenue Act of 1940, Pub. L. 76–801, 54 Stat. 974
- October 9, 1940: Assignment of Claims Act of 1940, Pub. L. 76–811, 54 Stat. 1029
- October 14, 1940: Nationality Act of 1940, Pub. L. 76–853, 54 Stat. 1137
- November 26, 1940: Ramspeck Act, Pub. L. 76–880, 54 Stat. 1211

== 77th United States Congress ==
- March 11, 1941: Lend-Lease Act, Pub. L. 77–11, 55 Stat. 31
- August 18, 1941: Flood Control Act of 1941, Pub. L. 77–228, 55 Stat. 638
- September 20, 1941: Revenue Act of 1941, Pub. L. 77–250, 55 Stat. 687
- December 8, 1941: Resolution— War between United States and Japan, Pub. L. 77–328, 55 Stat. 795
- December 11, 1941: Resolution— War between United States and Germany, Pub. L. 77–331, 55 Stat. 796
- December 11, 1941: Resolution— War between United States and Italy, Pub. L. 77–332, 55 Stat. 797
- December 18, 1941: War Powers Act of 1941, Pub. L. 77–354, 55 Stat. 838
- January 2, 1942: Foreign Claims Act, Pub. L. 77–393, 55 Stat. 880
- January 30, 1942: Emergency Price Control Act of 1942, Pub. L. 77–421, 56 Stat. 23
- June 5, 1942: Resolution— War between United States and Bulgaria, Pub. L. 77–563, 56 Stat. 307
- June 5, 1942: Resolution— War between United States and Hungary, Pub. L. 77–564, 56 Stat. 307
- June 5, 1942: Resolution— War between United States and Romania, Pub. L. 77–565, 56 Stat. 307
- June 22, 1942: Resolution— United States Flag Code, including recognition of the Pledge of Allegiance, Pub. L. 77–623, 56 Stat. 377
- October 21, 1942: Revenue Act of 1942, Pub. L. 77–753, 56 Stat. 798

== 78th United States Congress ==
- June 9, 1943: Current Tax Payment Act of 1943, Pub. L. 78–68, 57 Stat. 126
- December 17, 1943: Chinese Exclusion Repeal Act of 1943, Pub. L. 78–199, 57 Stat. 600
- February 3, 1944: Mustering-out Payment Act, Pub. L. 78–225, 58 Stat. 8
- February 25, 1944: Revenue Act of 1943, Pub. L. 78–235, 58 Stat. 21
- May 29, 1944: Individual Income Tax Act of 1944, Pub. L. 78–315, 58 Stat. 231
- June 22, 1944: Servicemen's Readjustment Act of 1944 (G.I. Bill), Pub. L. 78–346, 58 Stat. 284
- June 27, 1944: Veterans' Preference Act, Pub. L. 78–359, 58 Stat. 387
- July 1, 1944: Public Health Service Act, Pub. L. 78–410, 58 Stat. 682
- October 3, 1944: Surplus Property Act, Pub. L. 78–457, 58 Stat. 765
- December 20, 1944: Federal-Aid Highway Act of 1944, Pub. L. 78–521, 58 Stat. 838
- December 22, 1944: Pick-Sloan Flood Control Act of 1944, Pub. L. 78–534, 58 Stat. 887

== 79th United States Congress ==
- March 9, 1945: McCarran–Ferguson Act, Pub. L. 79–15, 59 Stat. 33
- July 31, 1945: Bretton Woods Agreements Act, Pub. L. 79–171, 59 Stat. 512
- July 31, 1945: Export–Import Bank Act of 1945, Pub. L. 79–173, 59 Stat. 526
- November 8, 1945: Revenue Act of 1945, Pub. L. 79–214, 59 Stat. 556
- December 20, 1945: United Nations Participation Act, Pub. L. 79–264, 59 Stat. 619
- December 28, 1945: War Brides Act, Pub. L. 79–271, 59 Stat. 659
- February 18, 1946: Rescission Act of 1946, Pub. L. 79–301, 60 Stat. 6
- February 20, 1946: Employment Act of 1946, Pub. L. 79–304, 60 Stat. 23
- May 13, 1946: Federal Airport Act of 1946, Pub. L. 79–377, 60 Stat. 170
- June 4, 1946: Richard B. Russell National School Lunch Act, Pub. L. 79–396, 60 Stat. 230
- June 11, 1946: Administrative Procedure Act, Pub. L. 79–404, 60 Stat. 237
- July 2, 1946: Luce–Celler Act of 1946, Pub. L. 79–483, 60 Stat. 416
- July 3, 1946: Hobbs Anti-Racketeering Act, Pub. L. 79–486, 60 Stat. 420
- July 3, 1946: National Mental Health Act, Pub. L. 79–487, 60 Stat. 421
- July 5, 1946: Lanham Trademark Act of 1946, Pub. L. 79–489, 60 Stat. 427
- July 15, 1946: Anglo-American loan, Pub. L. 79–509, 60 Stat. 535
- July 24, 1946: Flood Control Act of 1946, Pub. L. 79–526, 60 Stat. 641
- August 1, 1946: Atomic Energy Act of 1946, Pub. L. 79–585, 60 Stat. 755
- August 2, 1946: Legislative Reorganization Act of 1946, Pub. L. 79–601, 60 Stat. 812
- August 2, 1946: Federal Regulation of Lobbying Act of 1946, Pub. L. 79–601, Title III, 60 Stat. 839
- August 2, 1946: Federal Tort Claims Act, Pub. L. 79–601, Title IV, 60 Stat. 842
- August 13, 1946: Hospital Survey and Construction Act (Hill–Burton Act), Pub. L. 79–725, 60 Stat. 1040
- August 14, 1946: Farmers Home Administration Act, Pub. L. 79–731, 60 Stat. 1062

== 80th United States Congress ==
- May 22, 1947: Assistance to Greece and Turkey Act (Truman Doctrine), Pub. L. 80–75, 61 Stat. 103
- June 23, 1947: Taft–Hartley Act, Pub. L. 80–101, 61 Stat. 136
- July 18, 1947: Presidential Succession Act, Pub. L. 80–199, 61 Stat. 380
- July 26, 1947: National Security Act of 1947, Pub. L. 80–253, 61 Stat. 495
- January 27, 1948: Smith–Mundt Act (U.S. Information and Educational Exchange Act of 1948), Pub. L. 80–402, 62 Stat. 6
- April 2, 1948: Revenue Act of 1948, Pub. L. 80–471, 62 Stat. 110
- April 3, 1948: Marshall Plan (Foreign Assistance Act of 1948), Pub. L. 80–472, 62 Stat. 137
- April 3, 1948: Greek-Turkish Assistance Act of 1948 (Marshall Plan), Pub. L. 80–472, Title III, 62 Stat. 157
- May 26, 1948: Civil Air Patrol Act, Pub. L. 80–557, 62 Stat. 274
- June 12, 1948: Women's Armed Services Integration Act, Pub. L. 80–625, 62 Stat. 356
- June 24, 1948: Military Selective Service Act, Pub. L. 80–759, 62 Stat. 604
- June 25, 1948: Title 3 of the United States Code, Pub. L. 80–771, 62 Stat. 672
- June 25, 1948: Displaced Persons Act, Pub. L. 80–774, 62 Stat. 1009
- June 30, 1948: Flood Control Act of 1948, Pub. L. 80–858, Title II, 62 Stat. 1175
- July 3, 1948: War Claims Act of 1948, Pub. L. 80–896, 62 Stat. 1240
- July 3, 1948: Agricultural Act of 1948, Pub. L. 80–897, 62 Stat. 1247

== 81st United States Congress ==
- June 20, 1949: Central Intelligence Agency Act, Pub. L. 81–110, 63 Stat. 208
- June 30, 1949: Federal Property and Administrative Services Act of 1949, Pub. L. 81–152, 63 Stat. 377
- July 15, 1949: Housing Act of 1949, Pub. L. 81–171, 63 Stat. 413
- October 6, 1949: Mutual Defense Assistance Act, Pub. L. 81–329, 63 Stat. 714
- October 26, 1949: Fair Labor Standards Amendment, Pub. L. 81–393, 63 Stat. 910
- October 31, 1949: Agricultural Act of 1949, Pub. L. 81–439, 63 Stat. 1051
- May 5, 1950: Uniform Code of Military Justice, Pub. L. 81–506, 64 Stat. 107
- May 10, 1950: National Science Foundation Act, Pub. L. 81–507, 64 Stat. 149
- May 17, 1950: Flood Control Act of 1950, Pub. L. 81–516, Title II, 64 Stat. 170
- June 30, 1950: Lodge-Philbin Act, Pub. L. 81–597, 64 Stat. 316
- July 3, 1950: Puerto Rico Federal Relations Act of 1950, Pub. L. 81–600, 64 Stat. 319
- August 1, 1950: Guam Organic Act of 1950, Pub. L. 81–630, 64 Stat. 384
- August 15, 1950: Omnibus Medical Research Act, Pub. L. 81–692, 64 Stat. 443 (including Public Health Services Act Amendments, which established the National Institute of Neurological Diseases and Blindness)
- September 5, 1950: Federal Records Act, Pub. L. 81–754, Title V, 64 Stat. 583
- September 8, 1950: Defense Production Act of 1950, Pub. L. 81–774, 64 Stat. 798
- September 23, 1950: Revenue Act of 1950, Pub. L. 81–814, 64 Stat. 906
- September 23, 1950: McCarran Internal Security Act (including Subversive Activities Control Act of 1950), Pub. L. 81–831, 64 Stat. 987
- December 29, 1950: Celler–Kefauver Act (Anti-Merger Act), Pub. L. 81–899, 64 Stat. 1125

== 82nd United States Congress ==
- October 10, 1951: Mutual Security Act, Pub. L. 82–165, 65 Stat. 373
- October 20, 1951: Revenue Act of 1951, Pub. L. 82–183, 65 Stat. 452
- November 2, 1951: Boggs Act of 1951, Pub. L. 82–255, 65 Stat. 767
- June 25, 1952: Federal-Aid Highway Act of 1952, Pub. L. 82–413, 66 Stat. 158
- June 27, 1952: Immigration and Nationality Act of 1952 (McCarran–Walter Act), Pub. L. 82–414, 66 Stat. 163
- July 14, 1952: McGuire Act, Pub. L. 82–542, 66 Stat. 631
- July 16, 1952: Veterans' Readjustment Assistance Act, Pub. L. 82–550, 66 Stat. 663
- July 16, 1952: Federal Coal Mine Safety Act of 1952, Pub. L. 82–552, 66 Stat. 692
- July 16, 1952: Wire Fraud Act of 1952, Pub. L. 82–555, 66 Stat. 722
- July 19, 1952: Patent Act of 1952, Pub. L. 82–593, 66 Stat. 792

== 83rd United States Congress ==
- July 30, 1953: Small Business Act, Pub. L. 83–163, Title II, 67 Stat. 232
- August 7, 1953: Refugee Relief Act, Pub. L. 83–203, 67 Stat. 400
- August 7, 1953: Outer Continental Shelf Lands Act, Pub. L. 83–212, 67 Stat. 462
- August 14, 1953: Public Law 280, Pub. L. 83–280, 67 Stat. 588
- May 13, 1954: Saint Lawrence Seaway Act, Pub. L. 83–358, 68 Stat. 92
- July 10, 1954: Agricultural Trade Development and Assistance Act of 1954, Pub. L. 83–480, 68 Stat. 454
- August 2, 1954: Housing Act of 1954, Pub. L. 83–560, 68 Stat. 590 (including Federal National Mortgage Association Charter Act)
- August 4, 1954: Watershed Protection and Flood Prevention Act of 1954, Pub. L. 83–566, 68 Stat. 666
- August 13, 1954: Multiple Mineral Development Act, Pub. L. 83–585, 68 Stat. 708
- August 16, 1954: Internal Revenue Code of 1954, Pub. L. 83–591, 68A Stat. 3
  - Federal Unemployment Tax Act, §1(d), 68A Stat. 439
  - National Firearms Act, §1(d), 68A Stat. 721
- August 24, 1954: Communist Control Act of 1954, Pub. L. 83–637, 68 Stat. 775
- August 28, 1954: Agricultural Act of 1954, Pub. L. 83–690, 68 Stat. 897 (including National Wool Act of 1954)
- August 30, 1954: Atomic Energy Act of 1954, Pub. L. 83–703, 68 Stat. 919

== 84th United States Congress ==
- January 29, 1955: Formosa Resolution
- July 14, 1955: Air Pollution Control Act, Pub. L. 84–159, 69 Stat. 322
- May 9, 1956: Bank Holding Company Act, Pub. L. 84–511, 70 Stat. 133
- May 28, 1956: Agricultural Act of 1956, Pub. L. 84–540, 70 Stat. 188 (including Soil Bank Act)
- June 19, 1956: Library Services Act, Pub. L. 84–597, 70 Stat. 293
- June 29, 1956: Federal Aid Highway Act of 1956, (National Interstate and Defense Highways Act), Pub. L. 84–627, 70 Stat. 374
- July 28, 1956: Alaska Mental Health Enabling Act, Pub. L. 84–830, 70 Stat. 709
- August 1, 1956: Social Security Amendments of 1956 (Social Security Disability Insurance), Pub. L. 84–880, 70 Stat. 807
- August 3, 1956: Indian Relocation Act of 1956, Pub. L. 84–959, 70 Stat. 986
- August 8, 1956: Fish and Wildlife Act of 1956, Pub. L. 84–1024, 70 Stat. 1119

== 85th United States Congress ==
- May 23, 1957: Federal Plant Pest Act of 1957, Pub. L. 85–36, 71 Stat. 31
- August 28, 1957: Poultry Products Inspection Act of 1957, Pub. L. 85–172, 71 Stat. 441
- September 2, 1957: Price–Anderson Nuclear Industries Indemnity Act, Pub. L. 85–256, 71 Stat. 576
- September 9, 1957: Civil Rights Act of 1957, Pub. L. 85–315, 71 Stat. 634
- July 7, 1958: Automobile Information Disclosure Act of 1958, Pub. L. 85–506, 72 Stat. 325
- July 7, 1958: Alaska Statehood Act, Pub. L. 85–508, 72 Stat. 339
- July 29, 1958: National Aeronautics and Space Act, Pub. L. 85–568, 72 Stat. 426
- August 12, 1958: Transportation Act of 1958, Pub. L. 85–625, 72 Stat. 568
- August 23, 1958: Federal Aviation Act of 1958, Pub. L. 85–726, 72 Stat. 731
- August 25, 1958: Former Presidents Act, Pub. L. 85–745, 72 Stat. 838
- August 27, 1958: Humane Slaughter Act, Pub. L. 85–765, 72 Stat. 862
- August 28, 1958: Military Construction Appropriation Act (Advanced Research Projects Agency), Pub. L. 85–852, 72 Stat. 1096
- September 2, 1958: National Defense Education Act, Pub. L. 85–864, 72 Stat. 1580

== 86th United States Congress ==
- March 18, 1959: Hawaii Admission Act, Pub. L. 86–3, 73 Stat. 4
- September 14, 1959: Labor Management Reporting and Disclosure Act of 1959 (Landrum–Griffin Act), Pub. L. 86–257, 73 Stat. 519
- April 22, 1960: Narcotics Manufacturing Act of 1960, Pub. L. 86–429, 74 Stat. 55
- May 6, 1960: Civil Rights Act of 1960, Pub. L. 86–449, 74 Stat. 86
- June 12, 1960: Multiple-Use Sustained-Yield Act of 1960, Pub. L. 86–517, 74 Stat. 215

== 87th United States Congress ==
- May 1, 1961: Area Redevelopment Act, Pub. L. 87–27, 75 Stat. 47
- June 29, 1961: Travel Act, Pub. L. 87–63, 75 Stat. 129
- August 8, 1961: Consolidated Farm and Rural Development Act of 1961, Pub. L. 87–128, 75 Stat. 294
- August 30, 1961: Oil Pollution Act of 1961, Pub. L. 87–167, 75 Stat. 402
- September 4, 1961: Foreign Assistance Act, Pub. L. 87–195, 75 Stat. 424
- September 13, 1961: Federal Wire Act, Pub. L. 87–216, 75 Stat. 491
- September 21, 1961: Fulbright–Hays Act of 1961 (Mutual Educational and Cultural Exchange Act of 1961), Pub. L. 87–256, 75 Stat. 527
- September 22, 1961: Peace Corps Act of 1961, Pub. L. 87–293, 75 Stat. 612
- September 26, 1961: Arms Control and Disarmament Act of 1961, Pub. L. 87–297, 75 Stat. 631
- October 5, 1961: Community Health Services and Facilities Act, Pub. L. 87–395, 75 Stat. 824
- March 15, 1962: Manpower Development and Training Act, Pub. L. 87–415, 76 Stat. 23
- June 28, 1962: Migration and Refugee Assistance Act, Pub. L. 87–510, 76 Stat. 121
- July 10, 1962: All-Channel Receiver Act, Pub. L. 87–529, 76 Stat. 150
- August 31, 1962: Communications Satellite Act of 1962, Pub. L. 87–624, 76 Stat. 419
- October 10, 1962: McIntire–Stennis Act of 1962, Pub. L. 87–788, 76 Stat. 806
- October 11, 1962: Trade Expansion Act, Pub. L. 87–794, 76 Stat. 872
- October 16, 1962: Revenue Act of 1962, Pub. L. 87–834, 76 Stat. 960
- October 23, 1962: Bribery Act, Pub. L. 87–849, 76 Stat. 1119
- October 23, 1962: Vaccination Assistance Act, Pub. L. 87–868, 76 Stat. 1155
- October 23, 1962: Rivers and Harbors Act of 1962, Pub. L. 87–874

== 88th United States Congress ==
- June 10, 1963: Equal Pay Act of 1963, Pub. L. 88–38, 77 Stat. 56
- October 31, 1963: Community Mental Health Act, Pub. L. 88–164, 77 Stat. 282
- December 17, 1963: Clean Air Act, Pub. L. 88–206, 77 Stat. 392
- February 11, 1964: Library Services and Construction Act, Pub. L. 88–269, 78 Stat. 11
- February 26, 1964: Revenue Act of 1964, Pub. L. 88–272, 78 Stat. 19
- March 7, 1964: Presidential Transition Act of 1963, Pub. L. 88–277, 78 Stat. 153
- July 2, 1964: Civil Rights Act of 1964, Pub. L. 88–352, 78 Stat. 241
- July 9, 1964: Urban Mass Transportation Act of 1964 (Federal Transit Act), Pub. L. 88–365, 78 Stat. 302
- August 10, 1964: Gulf of Tonkin Resolution, Pub. L. 88–408, 78 Stat. 384
- August 20, 1964: Economic Opportunity Act of 1964, Pub. L. 88–452, 78 Stat. 508
- August 31, 1964: Food Stamp Act of 1964, Pub. L. 88–525, 78 Stat. 703
- September 3, 1964: Wilderness Act, Pub. L. 88–577, 78 Stat. 890
- September 3, 1964: Land and Water Conservation Act, Pub. L. 88–578, 78 Stat. 897
- September 4, 1964: Nurse Training Act, Pub. L. 88–581, 78 Stat. 908

== 89th United States Congress ==
- April 11, 1965: Elementary and Secondary Education Act, Pub. L. 89–10, 79 Stat. 77
- July 14, 1965: Older Americans Act, Pub. L. 89–73, 79 Stat. 218
- July 23, 1965: Coinage Act of 1965, Pub. L. 89–81, 79 Stat. 254
- July 27, 1965: Cigarette Labeling and Advertising Act, Pub. L. 89–92, 79 Stat. 282
- July 30, 1965: Social Security Amendments of 1965, Pub. L. 89–97, 79 Stat. 286 (including Medicaid and Medicare)
- August 6, 1965: Voting Rights Act of 1965, Pub. L. 89–110, 79 Stat. 437
- August 10, 1965: Housing and Urban Development Act of 1965, Pub. L. 89–117, 79 Stat. 451
- August 26, 1965: Public Works and Economic Development Act of 1965, Pub. L. 89–136, 79 Stat. 552
- September 9, 1965: Department of Housing and Urban Development Act, Pub. L. 89–174, 79 Stat. 667
- September 29, 1965: National Foundation on the Arts and the Humanities Act, Pub. L. 89–209, 79 Stat. 845
- October 3, 1965: Immigration and Nationality Act of 1965, (Hart-Celler Act, INS Act) Pub. L. 89–236, 79 Stat. 911
- October 6, 1965: Heart Disease, Cancer, and Stroke Amendments, Pub. L. 89–239, 79 Stat. 926
- October 20, 1965: National Emissions Standards Act, Pub. L. 89–272, 79 Stat. 992 (including Solid Waste Disposal Act of 1965)
- October 22, 1965: Highway Beautification Act, Pub. L. 89–285, 79 Stat. 1028
- October 27, 1965: Flood Control Act of 1965, Pub. L. 89–298, Title II, 79 Stat. 1073
- October 27, 1965: Rivers and Harbors Act of 1965, Pub. L. 89–298, Title III, 79 Stat. 1089
- November 3, 1965: Food and Agriculture Act of 1965, Pub. L. 89–321, 79 Stat. 1187
- November 8, 1965: Higher Education Act of 1965, Pub. L. 89–329, 79 Stat. 1219
- November 8, 1965: Vocational Rehabilitation Act Amendments Pub. L. 89–333, 79 Stat. 1282
- April 13, 1966: Uniform Time Act, Pub. L. 89–387, 80 Stat. 107
- July 4, 1966: Freedom of Information Act, Pub. L. 89–487, 80 Stat. 250
- July 13, 1966: Cotton Research and Promotion Act, Pub. L. 89–502, 80 Stat. 279
- August 24, 1966: Animal Welfare Act of 1966, Pub. L. 89–544, 80 Stat. 350
- September 9, 1966: National Traffic and Motor Vehicle Safety Act, Pub. L. 89–563, 80 Stat. 718
- October 11, 1966: Child Nutrition Act, Pub. L. 89–642, 80 Stat. 885
- October 15, 1966: National Historic Preservation Act of 1966, Pub. L. 89–665, 80 Stat. 915
- October 15, 1966: National Wildlife Refuge System Administration Act of 1966, Pub. L. 89–669, 80 Stat. 927
- October 15, 1966: Department of Transportation Act, Pub. L. 89–670, 80 Stat. 931
- October 15, 1966: Foreign Gifts and Decorations Act, Pub. L. 89–673, §1, 80 Stat. 952
- November 2, 1966: Cuban Adjustment Act, Pub. L. 89–732, 80 Stat. 1161
- November 3, 1966: Comprehensive Health, Planning and Service Act, Pub. L. 89–749, 80 Stat. 1180
- November 3, 1966: Demonstration Cities and Metropolitan Development Act, Pub. L. 89–754, 80 Stat. 1255

== 90th United States Congress ==
- April 4, 1967: Supplemental Defense Appropriations Act, Pub. L. 90–8, 81 Stat. 8
- June 29, 1967: Education Professions Development Act, Pub.L. 90-35, 81 Stat. 81
- November 7, 1967: Public Broadcasting Act of 1967, Pub. L. 90–129, 81 Stat. 365
- December 15, 1967: Wholesome Meat Act, Pub. L. 90–201, 81 Stat. 584
- December 15, 1967: Age Discrimination in Employment Act of 1967, Pub. L. 90–202, 81 Stat. 602
- December 18, 1967: National Park Foundation Act, Pub. L. 90–209, 81 Stat. 656
- January 2, 1968: Bilingual Education Act, Pub. L. 90–247, Title VII, 81 Stat. 816
- April 11, 1968: Civil Rights Act of 1968, Pub. L. 90–284, 82 Stat. 73
- April 16, 1968: Agricultural Fair Practices Act of 1967, Pub. L. 90–288, 82 Stat. 93
- May 29, 1968: Consumer Credit Protection Act, Pub. L. 90–321, 82 Stat. 146 (including Truth in Lending Act)
- June 19, 1968: Omnibus Crime Control and Safe Streets Act of 1968, Pub. L. 90–351, 82 Stat. 197
- June 28, 1968: Uniform Monday Holiday Act, Pub. L. 90–363, 82 Stat. 250
- June 28, 1968: Revenue and Expenditure Control Act of 1968, Pub. L. 90–364, 82 Stat. 251
- July 21, 1968: Aircraft Noise Abatement Act, Pub. L. 90–411
- August 1, 1968: Housing and Urban Development Act of 1968, Pub. L. 90–448, 82 Stat. 476
- August 12, 1968: Architectural Barriers Act of 1968, Pub. L. 90–480, 82 Stat. 718
- August 23, 1968: Federal-Aid Highway Act of 1968, Pub. L. 90–495, 82 Stat. 815
- October 2, 1968: Wild and Scenic Rivers Act, Pub. L. 90–542, 82 Stat. 906
- October 2, 1968: National Trails System Act, Pub. L. 90–543, 82 Stat. 919
- October 22, 1968: Gun Control Act of 1968, Pub. L. 90–618, 82 Stat. 1213
- October 22, 1968: Foreign Military Sales Act of 1968, Pub. L. 90–629, 82 Stat. 1320

== 91st United States Congress ==
- December 30, 1969: Tax Reform Act of 1969, Pub. L. 91–172, 83 Stat. 487
- December 30, 1969: Federal Coal Mine Health and Safety Act of 1969, Pub. L. 91–173, 83 Stat. 742
- January 1, 1970: National Environmental Policy Act, Pub. L. 91–190, 83 Stat. 852
- April 3, 1970: Environmental Quality Improvement Act, Pub. L. 91–224, Title II, 84 Stat. 114
- May 21, 1970: Airport and Airway Development Act of 1970, Pub. L. 91–258, Title I, 84 Stat. 219
- August 12, 1970: Postal Reorganization Act (United States Postal Service), Pub. L. 91–375, 84 Stat. 719
- August 15, 1970: Economic Stabilization Act of 1970, Pub. L. 91–379, Title II, 84 Stat. 799
- September 22, 1970: District of Columbia Delegate Act, Pub. L. 91–405, 84 Stat. 845
- October 15, 1970: Organized Crime Control Act, Pub. L. 91–452, 84 Stat. 922 including the Racketeer Influenced and Corrupt Organizations Act ("RICO")
- October 15, 1970: Urban Mass Transportation Act of 1970, Pub. L. 91–453, 84 Stat. 962
- October 26, 1970: Bank Secrecy Act, Pub. L. 91–508, 84 Stat. 1118 (including Fair Credit Reporting Act)
- October 26, 1970: Legislative Reorganization Act of 1970, Pub. L. 91–510, 84 Stat. 1140
- October 27, 1970: Comprehensive Drug Abuse Prevention and Control Act of 1970, Pub. L. 91–513, 84 Stat. 1236
- October 27, 1970: Controlled Substances Act, Pub. L. 91–513, Title II, 84 Stat. 1242
- October 30, 1970: Rail Passenger Service Act (Amtrak), Pub. L. 91–518, 84 Stat. 1327
- November 30, 1970: Agricultural Act of 1970, Pub. L. 91–524, 84 Stat. 1358
- December 9, 1970: Horse Protection Act of 1970, Pub. L. 91–540, 84 Stat. 1404
- December 24, 1970: Family Planning Services and Population Research Act of 1970, Pub. L. 91–572
- December 24, 1970: Plant Variety Protection Act of 1970, Pub. L. 91–577, 84 Stat. 1542
- December 29, 1970: Occupational Safety and Health Act (OSHA), Pub. L. 91–596, 84 Stat. 1590
- December 31, 1970: Clean Air Act Extension, Pub. L. 91–604, 84 Stat. 1676
- December 31, 1970: Housing and Urban Development Act of 1970, Pub. L. 91–609, 84 Stat. 1770, including title VII, National Urban Policy and New Community Development Act of 1970, 84 Stat. 1791
- January 12, 1971: Foreign Military Sales Act of 1971, Pub. L. 91–672, 84 Stat. 2053
- January 13, 1971: Lead-Based Paint Poisoning Prevention Act, Pub. L. 91–695

== 92nd United States Congress ==
- June 23, 1971: Javits–Wagner–O'Day Act, Pub. L. 92–28, 85 Stat. 77
- September 25, 1971: Non-Detention Act, Pub. L. 92–128, 85 Stat. 347
- December 10, 1971: Farm Credit Act of 1971, Pub. L. 92–181, 85 Stat. 583
- December 18, 1971: Alaska Native Claims Settlement Act, Pub. L. 92–203, 85 Stat. 688
- December 23, 1971: National Cancer Act, Pub. L. 92–218, 85 Stat. 778
- February 7, 1972: Federal Election Campaign Act, Pub. L. 92–225, 86 Stat. 3
- March 24, 1972: Equal Employment Opportunity Act of 1972, Pub. L. 92–261, 86 Stat. 103
- June 23, 1972: Education Amendments of 1972, Pub. L. 92–318, 86 Stat. 235
- August 30, 1972: Consolidated Farm and Rural Development Act of 1972, Pub. L. 92–419, 86 Stat. 657
- October 6, 1972: Federal Advisory Committee Act, Pub. L. 92–463, 86 Stat. 770
- October 18, 1972: Clean Water Act, Pub. L. 92–500, 86 Stat. 816
- October 21, 1972: Marine Mammal Protection Act, Pub. L. 92–522, 86 Stat. 1027
- October 23, 1972: Marine Protection, Research, and Sanctuaries Act of 1972, Pub. L. 92–532, 86 Stat. 1052
- October 27, 1972: Consumer Product Safety Act, Pub. L. 92–573, 86 Stat. 1207
- October 27, 1972: Noise Control Act, Pub. L. 92–574, 86 Stat. 1234
- October 27, 1972: Coastal Zone Management Act, Pub. L. 92–583, 86 Stat. 1280

== 93rd United States Congress ==
- August 10, 1973: Agriculture and Consumer Protection Act of 1973, Pub. L. 93–86, 87 Stat. 221
- August 13, 1973: Federal-Aid Highway Act of 1973, Pub. L. 93–87, Title I, 87 Stat. 250
- September 26, 1973: Rehabilitation Act of 1973, Pub. L. 93–112, 87 Stat. 355
- October 1, 1973: Domestic Volunteer Services Act of 1973 (VISTA), Pub. L. 93–113, 87 Stat. 394
- November 3, 1973: Amtrak Improvement Act, Pub. L. 93–146, 87 Stat. 548
- November 7, 1973: War Powers Resolution, Pub. L. 93–148, 87 Stat. 555
- November 27, 1973: Emergency Petroleum Allocation Act, Pub. L. 93–159, 87 Stat. 627
- December 24, 1973: District of Columbia Home Rule Act, Pub. L. 93–198, 87 Stat. 777
- December 28, 1973: Comprehensive Employment and Training Act, Pub. L. 93–203, 87 Stat. 839
- December 28, 1973: Endangered Species Act of 1973, Pub. L. 93–205, 87 Stat. 884
- December 29, 1973: Health Maintenance Organization Act of 1973, Pub. L. 93–222, 87 Stat. 936
- March 7, 1974: Water Resources Development Act of 1974, Pub. L. 93–251, 88 Stat. 34
- May 22, 1974: Disaster Relief Act of 1974, Pub. L. 93–288, 88 Stat. 143
- May 31, 1974: Research on Aging Act, Pub. L. 93–296, 88 Stat. 184
- June 24, 1974: Colorado River Basin Salinity Control Act, Pub. L. 93–320, 88 Stat. 266
- July 12, 1974: Congressional Budget and Impoundment Control Act of 1974, Pub. L. 93–344, 88 Stat. 297
- July 25, 1974: Legal Services Corporation Act, Pub. L. 93–355, 88 Stat. 378
- August 21, 1974: Family Educational Rights and Privacy Act, Pub. L. 93–380, Title V, §513, 88 Stat. 571
- August 22, 1974: Housing and Community Development Act of 1974, Pub. L. 93–383, 88 Stat. 633
- September 2, 1974: Employee Retirement Income Security Act of 1974 (ERISA), Pub. L. 93–406, 88 Stat. 829
- September 7, 1974: Juvenile Justice and Delinquency Prevention Act, Pub. L. 93–415, 88 Stat. 1109
- October 11, 1974: Energy Reorganization Act of 1974, Pub. L. 93–438, 88 Stat. 1233
- October 23, 1974: Commodity Futures Trading Commission Act of 1974, Pub. L. 93–463, 88 Stat. 1389
- October 28, 1974: Equal Credit Opportunity Act, Pub. L. 93–495, Title V, 88 Stat. 1521
- November 26, 1974: National Mass Transportation Assistance Act, Pub. L. 93–503, 88 Stat. 1565
- December 3, 1974: Vietnam Era Veterans' Readjustment Assistance Act, Pub. L. 93–508, 88 Stat. 1578
- December 16, 1974: Safe Drinking Water Act, Pub. L. 93–523, 88 Stat. 1660
- December 19, 1974: Presidential Recordings and Materials Preservation Act, Pub. L. 93–526, 88 Stat. 1695
- December 30, 1974: Foreign Assistance Act of 1974, Pub. L. 93–559, 88 Stat. 1795
- December 30, 1974: Hughes–Ryan Amendment, Pub. L. 93–559, section 32, 88 Stat. 1804
- December 31, 1974: Privacy Act of 1974, Pub. L. 93–579, 88 Stat. 1896
- January 3, 1975: Trade Act of 1974, Pub. L. 93–618, 88 Stat. 1978
- January 3, 1975: Eastern Wilderness Areas Act, Pub. L. 93–622, 88 Stat. 2096
- January 3, 1975: Federal Noxious Weed Act of 1974, Pub. L. 93–629, 88 Stat. 2148
- January 3, 1975: Hazardous Materials Transportation Act, Pub. L. 93–633, Title I, 88 Stat. 2156
- January 4, 1975: Indian Self-Determination and Education Assistance Act of 1975, Pub. L. 93–638, 88 Stat. 2203
- January 4, 1975: National Health Planning and Resources Development Act, Pub. L. 93–641, 88 Stat. 2225
- January 4, 1975: Federal-Aid Highway Amendments of 1974, Pub. L. 93–643, 88 Stat. 2281

== 94th United States Congress ==
- March 29, 1975: Tax Reduction Act of 1975, Pub. L. 94–12, 89 Stat. 26
- May 23, 1975: Indochina Migration and Refugee Assistance Act, Pub. L. 94–23, 89 Stat. 87
- June 4, 1975: Securities Acts Amendments of 1975, Pub. L. 94–29, 89 Stat. 97
- October 20, 1975: Japan-United States Friendship Act of 1975, Pub. L. 94–118, 89 Stat. 603
- November 29, 1975: Education for All Handicapped Children Act, Pub. L. 94–142, 89 Stat. 773
- December 22, 1975: Energy Policy and Conservation Act, Pub. L. 94–163, 89 Stat. 871
- December 23, 1975: Revenue Adjustment Act (Earned Income Tax Credit), Pub. L. 94–164, 89 Stat. 970
- December 23, 1975: Metric Conversion Act, Pub. L. 94–168, 89 Stat. 1007
- December 31, 1975: Home Mortgage Disclosure Act, Pub. L. 94–200, 89 Stat. 1124
- February 5, 1976: Railroad Revitalization and Regulatory Reform Act, Pub. L. 94–210, 90 Stat. 31
- June 30, 1976: Arms Export Control Act, Pub. L. 94–329, 90 Stat. 729
- September 13, 1976: Government in the Sunshine Act, Pub. L. 94–409, 90 Stat. 1241
- September 14, 1976: National Emergencies Act, Pub. L. 94–412, 90 Stat. 1255
- September 30, 1976: Hart–Scott–Rodino Antitrust Improvements Act, Pub. L. 94–435, 90 Stat. 1383
- October 8, 1976: Health Maintenance Organization Amendments of 1976, Pub. L. 94–460
- October 11, 1976: Toxic Substances Control Act of 1976, Pub. L. 94–469, 90 Stat. 2003
- October 12, 1976: Overhaul of vocational education programs Pub. L. 94–482, 90 Stat. 2169
- October 19, 1976: Copyright Act of 1976, Pub. L. 94–553, 90 Stat. 2541
- October 21, 1976: Federal Land Policy and Management Act of 1976, Pub. L. 94–579, 90 Stat. 2744
- October 21, 1976: Resource Conservation and Recovery Act, Pub. L. 94–580, 90 Stat. 2795
- October 22, 1976: Water Resources Development Act of 1976, Pub. L. 94–587, 90 Stat. 2917
- October 22, 1976: National Forest Management Act of 1976, Pub. L. 94–588, 90 Stat. 2949

== 95th United States Congress ==
- May 13, 1977: Economic Stimulus Appropriations Act of 1977, Pub. L. 95–29, 91 Stat. 122
- August 3, 1977: Surface Mining Control and Reclamation Act of 1977, Pub. L. 95–87, 91 Stat. 445
- August 4, 1977: Department of Energy Organization Act of 1977, Pub. L. 95–91, 91 Stat. 565
- September 29, 1977: Food and Agriculture Act of 1977, Pub. L. 95–113, 91 Stat. 913
- September 29, 1977: National Agricultural Research, Extension, and Teaching Policy Act of 1977, Pub. L. 95–113, Title XIV, 91 Stat. 981
- October 12, 1977: Community Reinvestment Act, Pub. L. 95–128, Title VIII, 91 Stat. 1147
- November 16, 1977: Federal Reserve Reform Act of 1977, Pub. L. 95–188, 91 Stat. 1387
- November 18, 1977: Soil and Water Conservation Act, Pub. L. 95–192, 91 Stat. 1407
- December 19, 1977: Unlawful Corporate Payments Act of 1977, Pub. L. 95–213, including Title I: Foreign Corrupt Practices Act, 91 Stat. 1494
- December 27, 1977: Clean Water Act of 1977, Pub. L. 95–217, 91 Stat. 1566
- December 28, 1977: International Emergency Economic Powers Act, Pub. L. 95–223, Title II, 91 Stat. 1626
- March 10, 1978: Nuclear Non-Proliferation Act of 1978, Pub. L. 95–242, 92 Stat. 120
- July 1, 1978: Cooperative Forestry Assistance Act of 1978, Pub. L. 95–313, 92 Stat. 365
- September 17, 1978: International Banking Act of 1978, Pub. L. 95–369, 92 Stat. 607
- October 10, 1978: Susan B. Anthony Dollar Coin Act of 1978, Pub. L. 95–447, 92 Stat. 1072
- October 12, 1978: Inspector General Act of 1978, Pub. L. 95–452, 92 Stat. 1101
- October 13, 1978: Civil Service Reform Act of 1978, Pub. L. 95–454, 92 Stat. 1111
- October 13, 1978: Drug Abuse Prevention, Treatment, and Rehabilitation Act, Pub. L. 95–461, 92 Stat. 1268
- October 21, 1978: Agricultural Trade Act of 1978, Pub. L. 95–501, 92 Stat. 1685
- October 24, 1978: Airline Deregulation Act, Pub. L. 95–504, 92 Stat. 1705
- October 25, 1978: Foreign Intelligence Surveillance Act, Pub. L. 95–511, 92 Stat. 1783
- October 26, 1978: Ethics in Government Act, Pub. L. 95–521, 92 Stat. 1824
- October 27, 1978: Humphrey–Hawkins Full Employment Act, Pub. L. 95–523, 92 Stat. 1887
- October 31, 1978: Pregnancy Discrimination Act, Pub. L. 95–555, 92 Stat. 2076
- November 1, 1978: Contract Disputes Act, Pub. L. 95–563, 92 Stat. 2383
- November 6, 1978: Bankruptcy Reform Act of 1978, Pub. L. 95–598, 92 Stat. 2549
- November 6, 1978: Revenue Act of 1978, Pub. L. 95–600, 92 Stat. 2763
- November 6, 1978: Surface Transportation Assistance Act of 1978, Pub. L. 95–599, 92 Stat. 2689
- November 8, 1978: Uranium Mill Tailings Radiation Control Act, Pub. L. 95–604, 92 Stat. 3021
- November 8, 1978: Indian Child Welfare Act, Pub. L. 95–608, 92 Stat. 3069
- November 9, 1978: Public Utility Regulatory Policies Act, Pub. L. 95–617, 92 Stat. 3117
- November 9, 1978: Energy Tax Act, Pub. L. 95–618, 92 Stat. 3174
- November 9, 1978: National Energy Conservation Policy Act, Pub. L. 95–619, 92 Stat. 3206
- November 10, 1978: Financial Institutions Regulatory and Interest Rate Control Act of 1978, Pub. L. 95–630, 92 Stat. 3641
- November 10, 1978: Right to Financial Privacy Act of 1978, Pub. L. 95–630, Title XI, 92 Stat. 3697
- November 10, 1978: Electronic Fund Transfer Act, Pub. L. 95–630, Title XX, 92 Stat. 3728

== 96th United States Congress ==
- April 10, 1979: Taiwan Relations Act, Pub. L. 96–8, 93 Stat. 14
- July 10, 1979: Joint resolution to amend the Public Health Services Act and related health laws to correct printing and other technical errors, Pub. L. 96–32
- July 26, 1979: Trade Agreements Act of 1979, Pub. L. 96–39, 93 Stat. 144
- September 27, 1979: Panama Canal Act of 1979, Pub. L. 96–70, 93 Stat. 452
- September 29, 1979: Export Administration Act of 1979, Pub. L. 96–72, 93 Stat. 503
- October 17, 1979: Department of Education Organization Act, Pub. L. 96–88, 93 Stat. 668
- March 17, 1980: Refugee Act, Pub. L. 96–212, 94 Stat. 102
- March 31, 1980: Depository Institutions Deregulation and Monetary Control Act, Pub. L. 96–221, 94 Stat. 132
- April 2, 1980: Crude Oil Windfall Profit Tax Act of 1980, Pub. L. 96–223, 94 Stat. 229
- June 30, 1980: Energy Security Act, Pub. L. 96–294, 94 Stat. 611
- July 1, 1980: Motor Carrier Act of 1980, Pub. L. 96–296, 94 Stat. 793
- September 19, 1980: Regulatory Flexibility Act, Pub. L. 96–354, 94 Stat. 1164
- September 29, 1980: Fish and Wildlife Conservation Act of 1980, Pub. L. 96–366, 94 Stat. 1322
- October 7, 1980: Mental Health Systems Act of 1980, Pub. L. 96–398, 94 Stat. 1564
- October 14, 1980: Staggers Rail Act, Pub. L. 96–448, 94 Stat. 1895
- October 15, 1980: Classified Information Procedures Act, Pub. L. 96–456, 94 Stat. 2025
- December 2, 1980: Alaska National Interest Lands Conservation Act, Pub. L. 96–487, 94 Stat. 2371
- December 11, 1980: Comprehensive Environmental Response, Compensation, and Liability Act (CERCLA or Superfund), Pub. L. 96–510, 94 Stat. 2767
- December 11, 1980: Paperwork Reduction Act, Pub. L. 96–511, 94 Stat. 2812
- December 12, 1980: Defense Officer Personnel Management Act, Pub. L. 96–513, 94 Stat. 2835
- December 12, 1980: Bayh–Dole Act, Pub. L. 96–517, 94 Stat. 3018
- December 22, 1980: Nuclear Safety, Research, Demonstration, and Development Act of 1980, Pub. L. 96–567, 94 Stat. 3329

== 97th United States Congress ==
- August 13, 1981: Economic Recovery Tax Act of 1981 (ERTA or Kemp-Roth Tax Cut), Pub. L. 97–34, 95 Stat. 172
- August 13, 1981: Omnibus Budget Reconciliation Act of 1981, Pub. L. 97–35, 95 Stat. 357
- December 1, 1981: Military Cooperation with Civilian Law Enforcement Agencies Act, Pub. L. 97–86, ch. 18, 95 Stat. 1114
- December 22, 1981: Agriculture and Food Act of 1981, Pub. L. 97–98, 95 Stat. 1213
- June 23, 1982: Intelligence Identities Protection Act, Pub. L. 97–200, 96 Stat. 122
- September 3, 1982: Tax Equity and Fiscal Responsibility Act of 1982, Pub. L. 97–248, 96 Stat. 324
- September 20, 1982: Bus Regulatory Reform Act, Pub. L. 97–261, 96 Stat. 1102
- October 13, 1982: Job Training Partnership Act of 1982, Pub. L. 97–300, 96 Stat. 1322
- October 15, 1982: Garn–St. Germain Depository Institutions Act, Pub. L. 97–320, 96 Stat. 1469
- January 6, 1983: Surface Transportation Assistance Act of 1982, Pub. L. 97–424, 96 Stat. 2140
- January 7, 1983: Nuclear Waste Policy Act, Pub. L. 97–425, 96 Stat. 2201
- January 12, 1983: Internal Revenue Code of 1954 and Social Security Act, amendments Pub. L. 97–455, 96 Stat. 2497

== 98th United States Congress ==
- March 24, 1983: Temporary Emergency Food Assistance Act of 1983, Pub. L. 98–8, Title II, 97 Stat. 35
- April 20, 1983: Social Security Amendments of 1983, Pub. L. 98–21, 97 Stat. 65
- August 5, 1983: Caribbean Basin Economic Recovery Act of 1983, Pub. L. 98–67, Title II, 97 Stat. 384
- August 26, 1983: Extra-Long Staple Cotton Act of 1983, Pub. L. 98–88, 97 Stat. 494
- November 2, 1983: Martin Luther King Jr. Day law, Pub. L. 98–144, 97 Stat. 917
- November 29, 1983: Dairy and Tobacco Adjustment Act of 1983, Pub. L. 98–180, 97 Stat. 1128
- July 17, 1984: National Minimum Drinking Age Act, Pub. L. 98–363, 98 Stat. 435
- July 17, 1984: Land Remote-Sensing Commercialization Act of 1984, Pub. L. 98–365, 98 Stat. 451
- July 18, 1984: Deficit Reduction Act of 1984, Pub. L. 98–369, 98 Stat. 494
- September 24, 1984: Drug Price Competition and Patent Term Restoration Act, Pub. L. 98–417, 98 Stat. 1585
- September 28, 1984: Voting Accessibility for the Elderly and Handicapped Act, Pub. L. 98–435, 98 Stat. 1678
- October 3, 1984: Secondary Mortgage Market Enhancement Act, Pub. L. 98–440, 98 Stat. 1689
- October 12, 1984: Comprehensive Crime Control Act of 1984, Pub. L. 98–473, Title II, 98 Stat. 1976
- October 12, 1984: Comprehensive Smoking Education Act, Pub. L. 98–474, 98 Stat. 2200
- October 19, 1984: National Archives and Records Administration Act, Pub. L. 98–497, 98 Stat. 2280
- October 19, 1984: Aviation Drug-Trafficking Control Act of 1984, Pub. L. 98–499, 98 Stat. 2312
- October 19, 1984: National Organ Transplant Act of 1984, Pub. L. 98–507, 98 Stat. 2339
- October 19, 1984: Carl D. Perkins Vocational and Technical Education Act, Pub. L. 98–524, 98 Stat. 2435
- October 30, 1984: Cable Communications Policy Act of 1984, Pub. L. 98–549, 98 Stat. 2779
- October 30, 1984: Trade and Tariff Act of 1984, Pub. L. 98–573, 98 Stat. 2948
- October 30, 1984: Commercial Space Launch Act of 1984, Pub. L. 98–575, 98 Stat. 3055

== 99th United States Congress ==
- June 11, 1985: United States–Israel Free Trade Area Implementation Act of 1985, Pub. L. 99–47, 99 Stat. 82
- December 12, 1985: Balanced Budget and Emergency Deficit Control Act of 1985 (Gramm–Rudman–Hollings Balanced Budget Act), Pub. L. 99–177, Title II, 99 Stat. 1038
- December 17, 1985: Gold Bullion Coin Act of 1985, Pub. L. 99–185, 99 Stat. 1177
- December 23, 1985: Food Security Act of 1985, Pub. L. 99–198, 99 Stat. 1354
- April 7, 1986: Consolidated Omnibus Budget Reconciliation Act of 1985 (COBRA) Pub. L. 99–272, 100 Stat. 82 (including Emergency Medical Treatment and Active Labor Act)
- May 19, 1986: Firearm Owners Protection Act, Pub. L. 99–308, 100 Stat. 449
- October 1, 1986: Goldwater–Nichols Act (Defense Reorganization), Pub. L. 99–433, 100 Stat. 992
- October 2, 1986: Comprehensive Anti-Apartheid Act, Pub. L. 99–440, 100 Stat. 1086
- October 17, 1986: Emergency Planning and Community Right-to-Know Act, Pub. L. 99–499 (title III), 100 Stat. 1728
- October 21, 1986: Electronic Communications Privacy Act, Pub. L. 99–508, 100 Stat. 1848
- October 22, 1986: Tax Reform Act of 1986, Pub. L. 99–514, 100 Stat. 2085
- October 27, 1986: Anti-Drug Abuse Act of 1986, Pub. L. 99–570, 100 Stat. 3207
- October 31, 1986: Age Discrimination in Employment Act of 1986, Pub. L. 99–572, 100 Stat. 3342
- November 6, 1986: Immigration Reform and Control Act of 1986 (Simpson-Mazzoli Act), Pub. L. 99–603, 100 Stat. 3359
- November 17, 1986: Water Resources Development Act of 1986, Pub. L. 99–662, 100 Stat. 4082

== 100th United States Congress ==
- April 2, 1987: Surface Transportation and Uniform Relocation Assistance Act, Pub. L. 100–17, 101 Stat. 132
- July 22, 1987: McKinney–Vento Homeless Assistance Act, Pub. L. 100–77, 101 Stat. 482
- August 20, 1987: Malcolm Baldrige National Quality Improvement Act of 1987, Pub. L. 100–107, 101 Stat. 724
- September 29, 1987: Balanced Budget and Emergency Deficit Control Reaffirmation Act of 1987, Pub. L. 100–119, 101 Stat. 754
- December 22, 1987: Omnibus Budget Reconciliation Act of 1987, Pub. L. 100–203, 101 Stat. 1330
- January 6, 1988: Agricultural Credit Act of 1987, Pub. L. 100–233, 101 Stat. 1568
- January 7, 1988: Computer Security Act of 1987, Pub. L. 100–235, 101 Stat. 1724
- January 8, 1988: Commodity Distribution Reform Act and WIC Amendments of 1987, Pub. L. 100–237, 101 Stat. 1733
- February 5, 1988: Housing and Community Development Act of 1987, Pub. L. 100–242, 101 Stat. 1815
- March 22, 1988: Civil Rights Restoration Act of 1987, Pub. L. 100–259, 102 Stat. 28
- April 22, 1988: Prescription Drug Marketing Act, Pub. L. 100–293, 102 Stat. 95
- June 27, 1988: Supreme Court Case Selections Act of 1988, Pub. L. 100–352, 102 Stat. 662
- July 1, 1988: Medicare Catastrophic Coverage Act, Pub. L. 100–360, 102 Stat. 683
- August 4, 1988: Worker Adjustment and Retraining Notification Act of 1988, Pub. L. 100–379, 102 Stat. 890
- August 10, 1988: Civil Liberties Act of 1988, Pub. L. 100–383, 102 Stat. 904
- August 23, 1988: Omnibus Foreign Trade and Competitiveness Act, Pub. L. 100–418, 102 Stat. 1107
- September 19, 1988: Hunger Prevention Act of 1988, Pub. L. 100–435, 102 Stat. 1645
- September 28, 1988: United States–Canada Free Trade Agreement Implementation Act of 1988, Pub. L. 100–449, 102 Stat. 1851
- October 13, 1988: Family Support Act, Pub. L. 100–485, 102 Stat. 2343
- October 17, 1988: Indian Gaming Regulatory Act, Pub. L. 100–497, 102 Stat. 2467
- October 24, 1988: Health Maintenance Organization Amendments of 1988, Pub. L. 100–517, 102 Stat. 2578
- October 25, 1988: Department of Veterans Affairs Act, Pub. L. 100–527, 102 Stat. 2635
- October 31, 1988: Berne Convention Implementation Act of 1988, Pub. L. 100–568, 102 Stat. 2853
- November 17, 1988: Water Resources Development Act of 1988, Pub. L. 100–676, 102 Stat. 4012
- November 18, 1988: Anti-Drug Abuse Act of 1988, Pub. L. 100–690, 102 Stat. 4181, (including Child Protection and Obscenity Enforcement Act, Alcoholic Beverage Labeling Act)
- November 23, 1988: Stafford Disaster Relief and Emergency Assistance Act, Pub. L. 100–707, 102 Stat. 4689

== 101st United States Congress ==
- April 10, 1989: Whistleblower Protection Act, Pub. L. 101–12, 103 Stat. 16
- August 9, 1989: Financial Institutions Reform, Recovery, and Enforcement Act of 1989, Pub. L. 101–73, 103 Stat. 183
- October 28, 1989: Flag Protection Act, Pub. L. 101–131, 103 Stat. 777
- July 26, 1990: Americans with Disabilities Act of 1990, Pub. L. 101–336, 104 Stat. 327
- August 18, 1990: Oil Pollution Act of 1990, Pub. L. 101–380, 104 Stat. 484
- August 18, 1990: Ryan White CARE Act, Pub. L. 101–381, 104 Stat. 576
- October 30, 1990: Individuals with Disabilities Education Act, Pub. L. 101–476, 104 Stat. 1103
- November 5, 1990: Launch Services Purchase Act of 1990
- November 5, 1990: Omnibus Budget Reconciliation Act of 1990, Pub. L. 101–508, 104 Stat. 1388 (including Human Genome Project funding)
- November 5, 1990: Budget Enforcement Act of 1990, Pub. L. 101–508, Title XIII, 104 Stat. 1388-573
- November 5, 1990: Federal Employees Pay Comparability Act of 1990, Pub. L. 101–509, 104 Stat. 1427
- November 5, 1990: Defense Acquisition Workforce Improvement Act, Pub. L. 101–510, Division A, Title XII, 104 Stat. 1638
- November 8, 1990: Nutrition Labeling and Education Act of 1990, Pub. L. 101–535, 104 Stat. 2353
- November 15, 1990: Clean Air Act Amendments of 1990, Pub. L. 101–549, 104 Stat. 2468
- November 15, 1990: Administrative Dispute Resolution Act, Pub. L. 101–552, 104 Stat. 2736
- November 15, 1990: Chief Financial Officers Act, Pub. L. 101–576, 104 Stat. 2838
- November 16, 1990: Native American Graves Protection and Repatriation Act, Pub. L. 101–601, 104 Stat. 3048
- November 28, 1990: Food, Agriculture, Conservation, and Trade Act of 1990, Pub. L. 101–624, 104 Stat. 3359
- November 28, 1990: Tongass Timber Reform Act, Pub. L. 101–626, 104 Stat. 4426
- November 28, 1990: Food and Drug Administration Revitalization Act, Pub. L. 101–635, 104 Stat. 4583
- November 28, 1990: Water Resources Development Act of 1990, Pub. L. 101–640, 104 Stat. 4604
- November 29, 1990: Negotiated Rulemaking Act, Pub. L. 101–648, 104 Stat. 4969
- November 29, 1990: Immigration Act of 1990, Pub. L. 101–649, 104 Stat. 4978
- December 1, 1990: Judicial Improvements Act of 1990, Pub. L. 101–650, 104 Stat. 5128 (including Visual Artists Rights Act)

== 102nd United States Congress ==
- January 14, 1991: Authorization for Use of Military Force Against Iraq Resolution of 1991, Pub. L. 102–1, 105 Stat. 3
- August 14, 1991: Intelligence Authorization Act, Pub. L. 102–88, 105 Stat. 429
- November 21, 1991: Civil Rights Act of 1991, Pub. L. 102–166, 105 Stat. 1071
- December 9, 1991: High Performance Computing and Communication Act of 1991, Pub. L. 102–194, 105 Stat. 1594
- December 18, 1991: Intermodal Surface Transportation Efficiency Act, Pub. L. 102–240, 105 Stat. 1914
- December 19, 1991: Federal Deposit Insurance Corporation Improvement Act of 1991, Pub. L. 102–242, 105 Stat. 2236
- October 5, 1992: United States–Hong Kong Policy Act, Pub. L. 102–383, 106 Stat. 1448
- October 9, 1992: Chinese Student Protection Act of 1992, Pub. L. 102–404, 106 Stat. 1969
- October 23, 1992: Former Soviet Union Demilitarization Act of 1992, Pub. L. 102–484, Division A, Title XIV, 106 Stat. 2563
- October 23, 1992: Weapons of Mass Destruction Control Act, Pub. L. 102–484, Division A, Title XV, 106 Stat. 2567
- October 23, 1992: Cuban Democracy Act, Pub. L. 102–484, Division A, Title XVII, 106 Stat. 2575
- October 24, 1992: Energy Policy Act of 1992, Pub. L. 102–486, 106 Stat. 2776
- October 24, 1992: Freedom Support Act, Pub. L. 102–511, 106 Stat. 3320
- October 26, 1992: President John F. Kennedy Assassination Records Collection Act of 1992, Pub. L. 102–526, 106 Stat. 3443
- October 28, 1992: Housing and Community Development Act of 1992, Pub. L. 102–550, 106 Stat. 3672
- October 31, 1992: Water Resources Development Act of 1992, Pub. L. 102–580, 106 Stat. 4797
- Weather Service Modernization Act of 1992

== 103rd United States Congress ==
- February 5, 1993: Family and Medical Leave Act of 1993, Pub. L. 103–3, 107 Stat. 6
- May 20, 1993: National Voter Registration Act of 1993, Pub. L. 103–31, 107 Stat. 77
- August 3, 1993: Government Performance and Results Act, Pub. L. 103–62, 107 Stat. 285
- August 10, 1993: Omnibus Budget Reconciliation Act of 1993, Pub. L. 103–66, 107 Stat. 312
- November 16, 1993: Religious Freedom Restoration Act, Pub. L. 103–141, 107 Stat. 1488
- November 30, 1993: Brady Handgun Violence Prevention Act (Brady Bill), Pub. L. 103–159, title I, 107 Stat. 1536
- November 30, 1993: National Defense Authorization Act for Fiscal Year 1994, Pub. L. 103–160, 107 Stat. 1670 (including elements of Don't ask, don't tell)
- December 8, 1993: North American Free Trade Agreement Implementation Act, Pub. L. 103–182, 107 Stat. 2057
- December 17, 1993: FRIENDSHIP Act of 1993, Pub. L. 103–199, 107 Stat. 2317
- April 30, 1994: International Broadcasting Act, Pub. L. 103–236, Title III, 108 Stat. 432
- May 26, 1994: Freedom of Access to Clinic Entrances Act, Pub. L. 103–259, 108 Stat. 694
- August 17, 1994: General Aviation Revitalization Act, Pub. L. 103–298, 108 Stat. 1552
- September 13, 1994: Violent Crime Control and Law Enforcement Act, Pub. L. 103–322, 108 Stat. 1796 (including the Violence Against Women Act)
- September 29, 1994: Riegle-Neal Interstate Banking and Branching Efficiency Act of 1994, Pub. L. 103–328, 108 Stat. 2338
- October 13, 1994: Federal Crop Insurance Reform and Department of Agriculture Reorganization Act of 1994, Pub. L. 103–354, 108 Stat. 3178
- October 20, 1994: Improving America's Schools Act of 1994, Pub. L. 103–382, 108 Stat. 3518
- October 25, 1994: Dietary Supplement Health And Education Act of 1994, Pub. L. 103–417, 108 Stat. 4325
- November 2, 1994: Healthy Meals for Healthy Americans Act of 1994, Pub. L. 103–448, 108 Stat. 4699

== 104th United States Congress ==
- January 23, 1995: Congressional Accountability Act of 1995, Pub. L. 104–1 (text) (PDF), 109 Stat. 3
- April 10, 1995: Mexican Debt Disclosure Act of 1995, Pub. L. 104–6 (text) (PDF), Title IV, 109 Stat. 89
- November 8, 1995: Jerusalem Embassy Act, Pub. L. 104–45 (text) (PDF), 109 Stat. 398
- November 28, 1995: National Highway System Designation Act of 1995, Pub. L. 104–59 (text) (PDF), 109 Stat. 568
- December 19, 1995: Lobbying Disclosure Act of 1995, Pub. L. 104–65 (text) (PDF), 109 Stat. 691
- December 22, 1995: Private Securities Litigation Reform Act, Pub. L. 104–67 (text) (PDF), 109 Stat. 737
- February 8, 1996: Telecommunications Act of 1996, Pub. L. 104–104 (text) (PDF), 110 Stat. 56 (including the Communications Decency Act)
- March 12, 1996: Cuban Liberty and Democratic Solidarity Act of 1996 (Helms–Burton Act), Pub. L. 104–114 (text) (PDF), 110 Stat. 785
- April 4, 1996: Federal Agriculture Improvement and Reform Act of 1996, Pub. L. 104–127 (text) (PDF), 110 Stat. 888
- April 9, 1996: Line Item Veto Act of 1996, Pub. L. 104–130 (text) (PDF), 110 Stat. 1200
- April 24, 1996: Antiterrorism and Effective Death Penalty Act of 1996, Pub. L. 104–132 (text) (PDF), 110 Stat. 1214
- July 30, 1996: Taxpayer Bill of Rights 2, Pub. L. 104–168 (text) (PDF), 110 Stat. 1452
- August 3, 1996: National Gambling Impact Study Commission Act, Pub. L. 104–169 (text) (PDF), 110 Stat. 1482
- August 5, 1996: Iran and Libya Sanctions Act, Pub. L. 104–172 (text) (PDF), 110 Stat. 1541
- August 20, 1996: Small Business Job Protection Act of 1996, Pub. L. 104–188 (text) (PDF), 110 Stat. 1755
- August 21, 1996: Health Insurance Portability and Accountability Act (HIPAA), Pub. L. 104–191 (text) (PDF), 110 Stat. 1936
- August 21, 1996: War Crimes Act of 1996, Pub. L. 104–192 (text) (PDF), 110 Stat. 2104
- August 22, 1996: Personal Responsibility and Work Opportunity Act (Welfare Reform Act), Pub. L. 104–193 (text) (PDF), 110 Stat. 2105
- September 21, 1996: Defense of Marriage Act (DOMA), Pub. L. 104–199 (text) (PDF), 110 Stat. 2419
- September 30, 1996: Library Services and Technology Act, Pub. L. 104–208 (text) (PDF), 110 Stat. 3009-295
- September 30, 1996: Domestic Violence Offender Gun Ban, Pub. L. 104–208 (text) (PDF), 110 Stat. 3009-371
- September 30, 1996: Illegal Immigration Reform and Immigrant Responsibility Act of 1996, Pub. L. 104–208 (text) (PDF), Div. C, 110 Stat. 3009-546
- October 1, 1996: Bill Emerson Good Samaritan Act of 1996, Pub. L. 104–210 (text) (PDF), 110 Stat. 3011
- October 3, 1996: Comprehensive Methamphetamine Control Act of 1996, Pub. L. 104–237 (text) (PDF), 110 Stat. 3099
- October 11, 1996: Economic Espionage Act of 1996, Pub. L. 104–294 (text) (PDF), 110 Stat. 3488
- October 12, 1996: Water Resources Development Act of 1996, Pub. L. 104–303 (text) (PDF), 110 Stat. 3658

== 105th United States Congress ==
- August 5, 1997: Balanced Budget Act of 1997, Pub. L. 105–33 (text) (PDF), 111 Stat. 251
- August 5, 1997: Taxpayer Relief Act of 1997, Pub. L. 105–34 (text) (PDF), 111 Stat. 788
- November 19, 1997: Adoption and Safe Families Act, Pub. L. 105–89 (text) (PDF), 111 Stat. 2115
- November 21, 1997: Food and Drug Administration Modernization Act of 1997, Pub. L. 105–115 (text) (PDF), 111 Stat. 2296
- December 1, 1997: United States $1 Coin Act of 1997, Pub. L. 105–124 (text) (PDF), 111 Stat. 2536
- June 9, 1998: Transportation Equity Act for the 21st Century, Pub. L. 105–178 (text) (PDF), 112 Stat. 107
- June 23, 1998: Agricultural Research, Extension, and Education Reform Act of 1998, Pub. L. 105–185 (text) (PDF), 112 Stat. 523
- July 22, 1998: Internal Revenue Service Restructuring and Reform Act of 1998, Pub. L. 105–206 (text) (PDF), 112 Stat. 726
- August 7, 1998: Workforce Investment Act of 1998, Pub. L. 105–220 (text) (PDF), 112 Stat. 936
- October 21, 1998: Federal Vacancies Reform Act of 1998, Pub. L. 105–277 (text) (PDF), 112 Stat. 2681-611
- October 21, 1998: Internet Tax Freedom Act, Pub. L. 105–277 (text) (PDF), Division C, Title XI, 112 Stat. 2681-719
- October 21, 1998: Children's Online Privacy Protection Act, Pub. L. 105–277 (text) (PDF), Division C, Title XIII, 112 Stat. 2681-728
- October 21, 1998: McDade Amendment, Pub. L. 105–277 (text) (PDF), 112 Stat. 2681–118
- October 27, 1998: International Religious Freedom Act of 1998, Pub. L. 105–292 (text) (PDF), 112 Stat. 2787
- October 27, 1998: Sonny Bono Copyright Term Extension Act, Pub. L. 105–298 (text) (PDF), Title I, 112 Stat. 2827
- October 28, 1998: Digital Millennium Copyright Act, Pub. L. 105–304 (text) (PDF), 112 Stat. 2860 (including Online Copyright Infringement Liability Limitation Act)
- October 31, 1998: Iraq Liberation Act, Pub. L. 105–338 (text) (PDF), 112 Stat. 3178

== 106th United States Congress ==
- May 21, 1999: Emergency Supplemental Appropriations Act (Kosovo operations), Pub. L. 106–31 (text) (PDF), 113 Stat. 57
- August 17, 1999: Water Resources Development Act of 1999, Pub. L. 106–53 (text) (PDF), 113 Stat. 269
- November 12, 1999: Gramm–Leach–Bliley Act, Pub. L. 106–102 (text) (PDF), 113 Stat. 1338
- November 29, 1999: American Inventors Protection Act, Pub. L. 106–113 (text) (PDF), 113 Stat. 1536 (including Anticybersquatting Consumer Protection Act)
- December 14, 1999: Foster Care Independence Act, Pub. L. 106–169 (text) (PDF), 113 Stat. 1882
- March 14, 2000: Iran Nonproliferation Act of 2000, Pub. L. 106–178 (text) (PDF), 114 Stat. 38
- April 5, 2000: Wendell H. Ford Aviation Investment and Reform Act for the 21st Century, Pub. L. 106–181 (text) (PDF), 114 Stat. 61
- May 18, 2000: African Growth and Opportunity Act, Pub. L. 106–200 (text) (PDF), Title I, 114 Stat. 251
- May 18, 2000: Caribbean Basin Trade Partnership Act, Pub. L. 106–200 (text) (PDF), Title II, 114 Stat. 275
- June 20, 2000: Agriculture Risk Protection Act of 2000, Pub. L. 106–224 (text) (PDF), 114 Stat. 358
- June 30, 2000: Electronic Signatures in Global and National Commerce Act, Pub. L. 106–229 (text) (PDF), 114 Stat. 464
- August 7, 2000: Oceans Act of 2000, Pub. L. 106–256 (text) (PDF), 114 Stat. 644
- September 22, 2000: Religious Land Use and Institutionalized Persons Act, Pub. L. 106–274 (text) (PDF), 114 Stat. 803
- October 10, 2000: United States–China Relations Act of 2000, Pub. L. 106–286 (text) (PDF), 114 Stat. 880
- October 17, 2000: Children's Health Act, Pub. L. 106–310 (text) (PDF), 114 Stat. 1101
- October 30, 2000: Disaster Mitigation Act of 2000, Pub. L. 106–390 (text) (PDF), 114 Stat. 1552
- October 30, 2000: Secure Rural Schools and Community Self-Determination Act of 2000, Pub. L. 106–393 (text) (PDF), 114 Stat. 1607
- October 30, 2000: Floyd D. Spence National Defense Authorization Act for Fiscal Year 2001,Pub. L. 106–398 (text) (PDF)
- December 7, 2000: Shark Finning Prohibition Act, Pub. L. 106–557 (text) (PDF), 114 Stat. 2771
- December 11, 2000: Water Resources Development Act of 2000, Pub. L. 106–541 (text) (PDF), 114 Stat. 2572
- December 21, 2000: Commodity Futures Modernization Act of 2000, Pub. L. 106–554 (text) (PDF), 114 Stat. 2763A (as part of the Consolidated Appropriations Act, 2001)
