= Multijurisdictional Counterdrug Task Force Training =

MCTFT
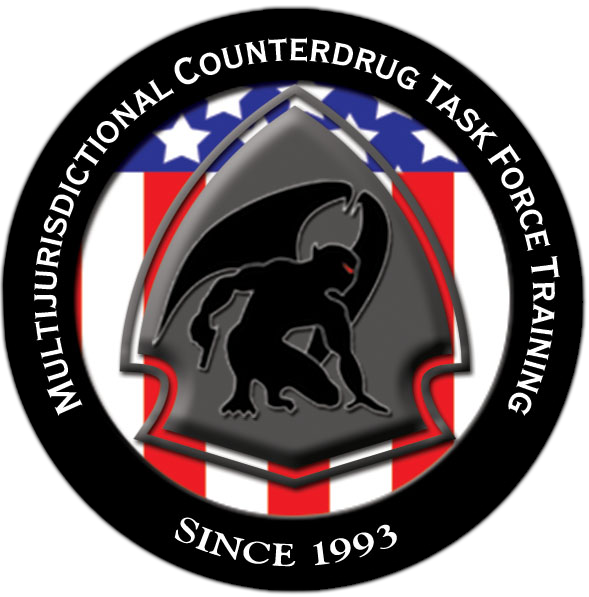
- Origin: 1993
- Authorities: Title 10 (Armed Forces); Title 32 (National Guard); National Defense Auth. Act
- Organizations supported: Military services Federal agencies State and local LEA; Combatant Commands; Counterdrug
- Support types: On-site training Mobile training Course design Custom training Online training Distance learning
- Students trained 1993–2013: 6 million

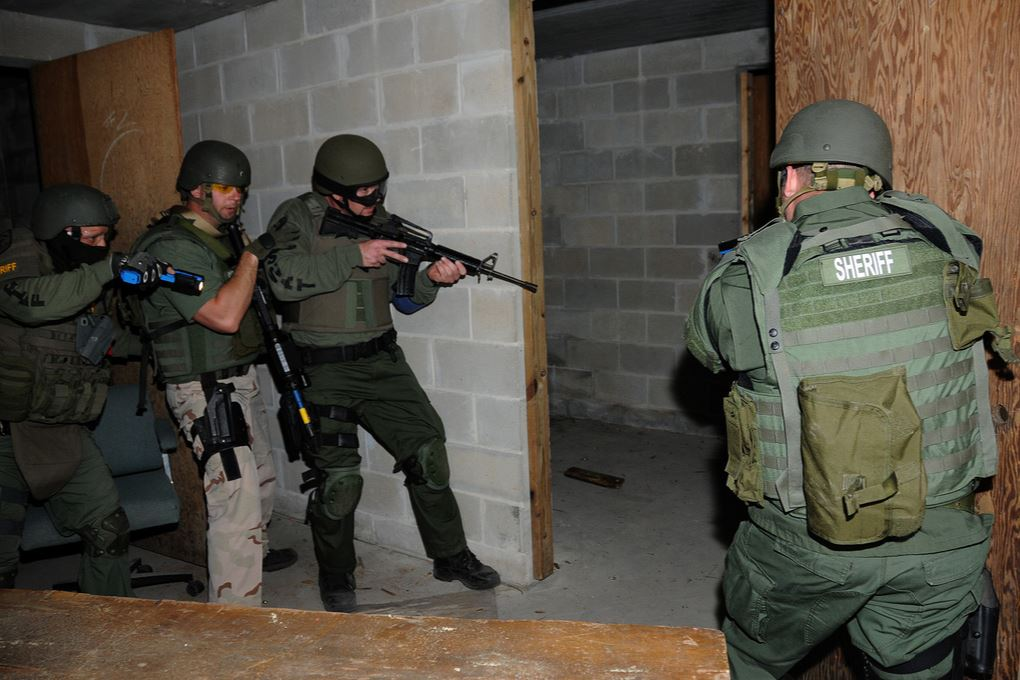
MCTFT trains U.S. Marshals

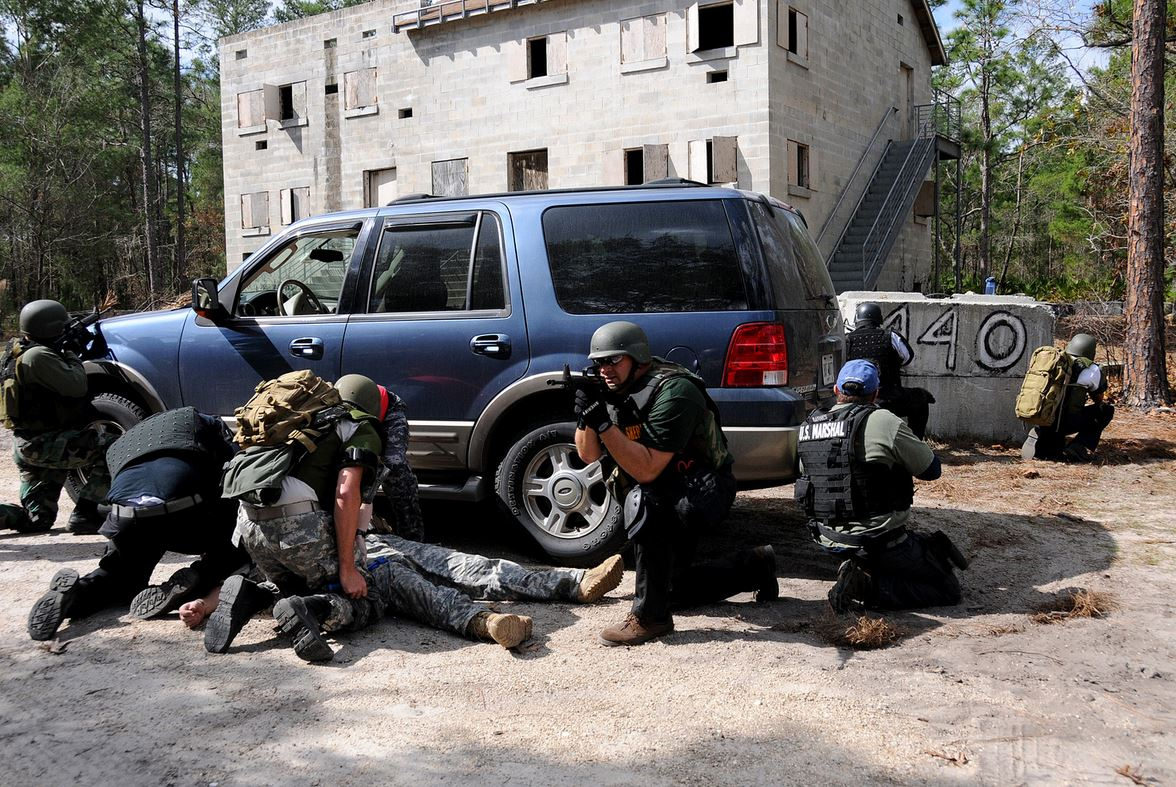
MCTFT trains U.S. Marshals

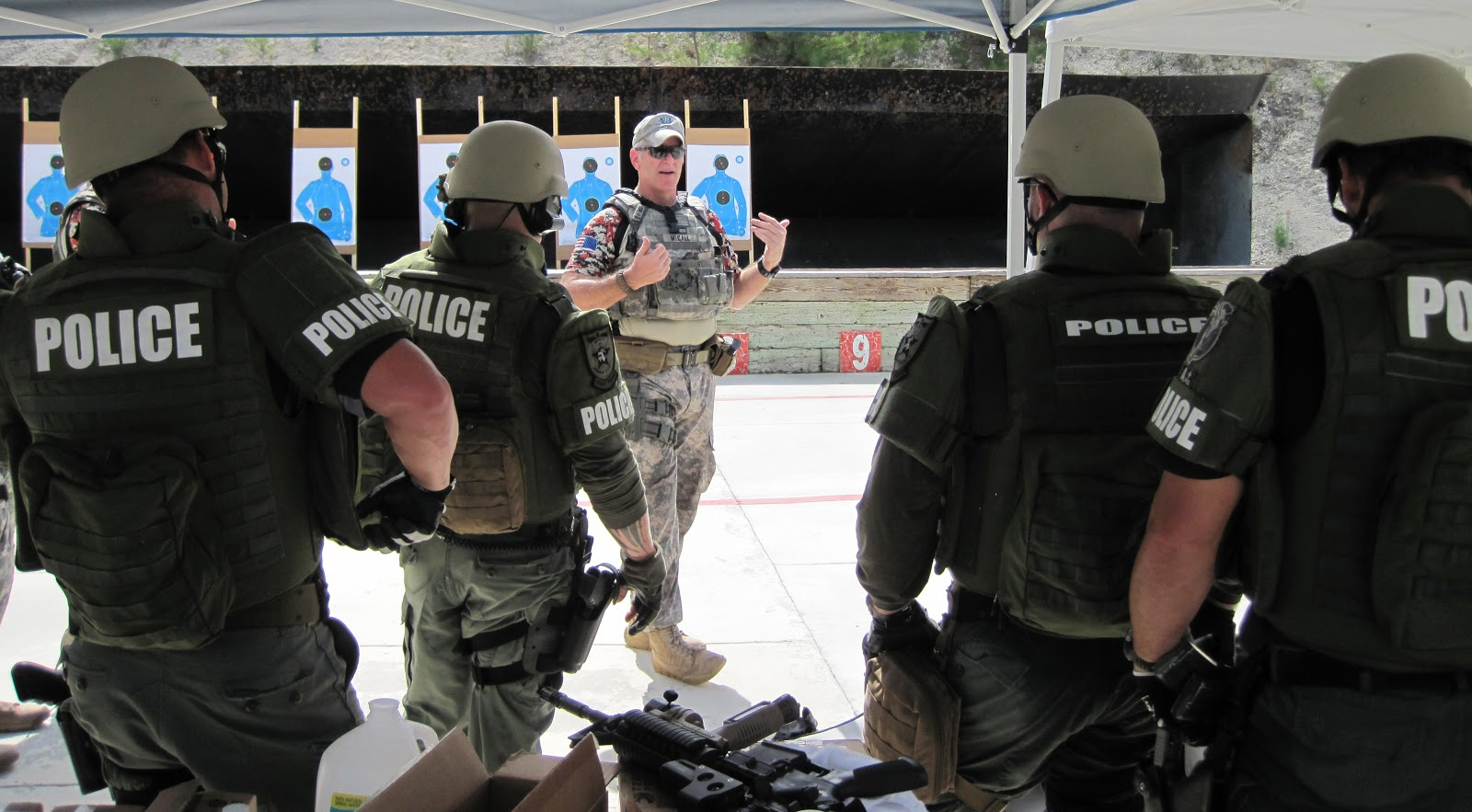
MCTFT trains SWAT

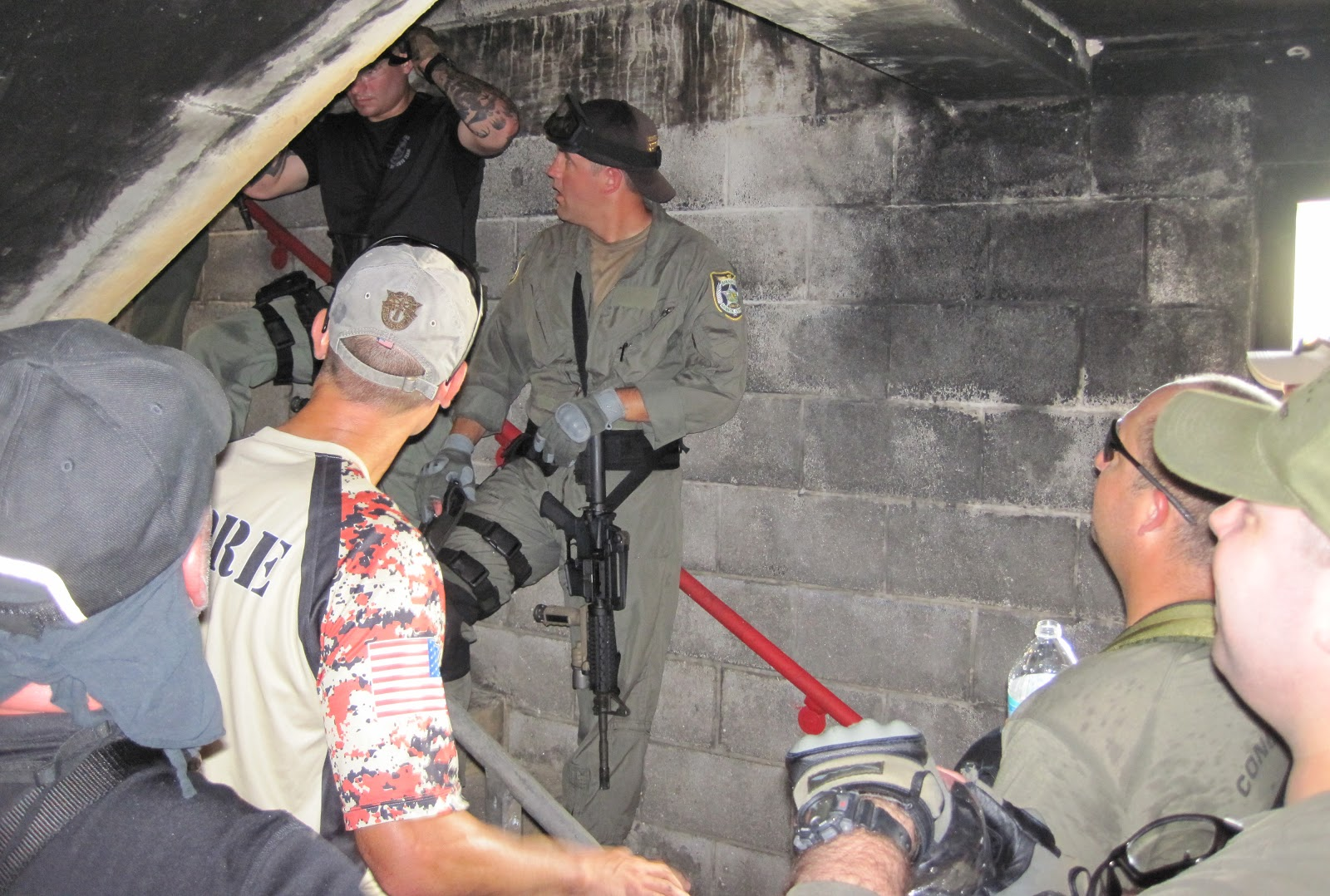
MCTFT trains SWAT

Multijurisdictional Counterdrug Task Force Training (MCTFT) is a United States Department of Defense (US DOD) program managed by the National Guard that provides unique, tuition-free military and counterdrug training for local, state, federal, and military criminal justice professionals as well as awareness training for community leaders. The MCTFT program is funded by the Department of Defense and administered through the Florida National Guard, and exists to fulfill the counterdrug training needs of law enforcement personnel. Nationally responsive, the program meets the training needs of all 50 U.S. states and four U.S. territories.

MCTFT produces numerous public service announcements (PSAs) regarding the use, spread, and effects of drugs. Media outlets across the United States routinely feature MCTFT PSAs and anti-drug videos in reports on the combating of local drug epidemics.

== Training Types ==
Emerging Drug Threats MCTFT personnel provide instruction and awareness education on emerging drug threats and dangerous new drugs spreading across the United States.

Local Law Enforcement Agency Training MCTFT provides training to local law enforcement officers on a variety of counterdrug law enforcement topics, such as secret compartment recognition education. MCTFT trains local law enforcement agencies across the United States in tactical counterdrug operations.

Military to Military Training MCTFT provides military training for counter-drug efforts, including courses in Counter-Threat Finance, Interview Techniques, tactical combat casualty care, land navigation, movement techniques, and weapon marksmanship.

Federal Agency Training MCTFT provides training to numerous federal agencies.

Tactical Medical MCTFT trains first responders to provide lifesaving intervention to wounded people in any type of environment. Adapted from military courses, TACMED was designed to teach Law Enforcement Officers the life saving medical techniques gained in combat.

Online Training MCTFT provides numerous online counterdrug training courses and many police academies and colleges throughout the United States direct students to the MCTFT to fulfill some of their training requirements or to serve as important references in guiding careers in law enforcement.

== History ==
In 1981, the Military Cooperation with Civilian Law Enforcement Agencies Act was enacted, allowing the United States military to cooperate with civilian law enforcement officials in the support of counterdrug operations and other law enforcement operations. The legislation allows the U.S. military to give civilian law enforcement agencies access to its military bases and its military equipment. The legislation was promoted during the Presidency of Ronald Reagan in the context of the war on drugs, and is considered a part of a general trend towards the militarization of police.

The Anti-Drug Abuse Act of 1988 established the Office of National Drug Control Policy, which was charged with establishing policies, priorities, and objectives for the nation's drug control program; the office established five long-term goals, including the support of law enforcement officials and counterdrug training. In 1989, the National Guard began conducting interdiction and anti-drug activities in the fight against illicit drugs.

The Department of Defense established the MCTFT in 1993, and since this time the MCTFT has trainined more than one million registered students through live and distance learning courses.

During an earmark declaration to Congress in 2009, Representative C. W. Young testified that the MCTFT "is the most comprehensive counter-drug training program today."

== Leadership ==
Adjutant General - MG Michael A. Calhoun
Joint Director of Military Support - COL William J. Beiswenger, Jr
MCTFT Commandant - CPT John Clark
MCTFT SEA - CSM Juan Sanchez

== Authority to Operate ==
"Under such regulations as the Secretary of Defense may prescribe, the Chief of the National Guard Bureau may establish and operate, or provide financial assistance to the States to establish and operate, not more than 5 schools (to be known generally as 'National Guard counterdrug schools')."
