= Special Central American Assistance Act of 1979 =

Federal statute regarding human rights

- Long title: An Act to amend the Foreign Assistance Act of 1961 to authorize assistance in support of peaceful and democratic processes of development in Central America.
- Nicknames: Special Central American and Caribbean Assistance Act of 1979
- Enacted by: the 96th United States Congress
- Effective: May 31, 1980

Citations
- Public law: 96-257
- Statutes at Large: 94 Stat. 422

Codification
- Acts amended: Foreign Assistance Act of 1961
- Titles amended: 22 U.S.C.: Foreign Relations and Intercourse
- U.S.C. sections amended: 22 U.S.C. ch. 32, subch. I §§ 2151, 2151n; 22 U.S.C. ch. 32, subch. II §§ 2304, 2346e

Legislative history
- Introduced in the House as H.R. 6081 by Clement J. Zablocki (D-WI) on December 11, 1979; Committee consideration by House Foreign Affairs, Senate Foreign Relations; Passed the Senate on January 29, 1980 (55-34 (Roll Call #17), in lieu of S. 2012); Passed the House on February 27, 1980 (202-197 (Roll Call #88)); Agreed to by the Senate on May 19, 1980 (44-35 (Roll Call #151)); Signed into law by President Jimmy Carter on May 31, 1980

Special Central American Assistance Act of 1979 was a United States federal statute established by the 96th United States Congress amending the Foreign Assistance Act of 1961. The Caribbean Basin statute appropriated conditions for cultivating civility, democratization, human rights, and non-interventionism in Central America. The Act of Congress endorsed the Organization of American States embodied by Costa Rica, El Salvador, Guatemala, Honduras, Nicaragua, and Panama. The international organization would serve to exemplify multilateralism in pursuance of denouncing left-wing terrorism, political violence, and third world socialism.

During the final months of 1979, the Carter Administration issued affirmative statements to the 96th United States Congress endorsing the proposed Central American assistance legislation providing additional foreign and monetary aid for the affliction of civil disorder in the Americas region. The H.R. 6081 bill was enacted into law by the 39th President of the United States Jimmy Carter on May 31, 1980.

== Declaration of the Act ==
The United States statute's articulation was a consistent Act bolstering the Carter Administration's foreign policy with a prominent emphasis regarding international human rights law during the New Cold War.

The 96th congressional session penned the United States public law 96-257 as three sections citing the amendment and purpose of the Act with section five hundred and thirty-six conveyed as eleven subsections entitled Central American Economic Support.

Special Central American Assistance Act of 1979 - 94 Stat. 422 § I

Foreign Assistance Act of 1961 Amendment - 94 Stat. 422 § II

Central American Economic Support - 94 Stat. 422-424 § DXXXVI

(b) Appropriation authorization
(c) Human rights violations

Human rights in Costa Rica
Human rights in El Salvador
Human rights in Guatemala
Human rights in Honduras
Human rights in Nicaragua
Panama Truth Commission

(d) Presidential encouragement of human rights
(e) Nicaragua acknowledgment or adherence of internationally recognized Universal Declaration of Human Rights
(f) Report to congressional committees
(g) Certification of nonterrorism; Transmittal to the Speaker of the House and the Senate Committee on Foreign Relations
(h) U.S. support of Organization of American States members against terrorism
(i) Funds available for National Agrarian University of Nicaragua and National Autonomous University of Nicaragua
(j) Loan funds for private sector use and local currency loan programs
(k) Assistance conditions and termination

Free and open elections
Loan funds and United States goods or services purchase
United States President reports to Congress

== Human Rights Practices and United States International Relations ==
The Foreign Assistance Act of 1974 described the terms of gross violations of internationally recognized human rights as defined;

- Torture or cruel and unusual punishment, inhuman or degrading treatment, or punishment
- Prolonged detention without charges
- Flagrant denial of the right to life, liberty, and the security of person

The International Security Assistance and Arms Exports Control Act of 1976 acknowledge the international obligations of human rights as endorsed by Title III - General Limitations of the Act passed by the 94th United States Congress. The section amended the Foreign Assistance Act of 1961 declaring United States human rights objectives as defined;

Foreign policy of the United States is to foster increased observance of internationally recognized human rights by all countries
Security assistance nullified for any country where the government engages in a consistent pattern of gross violations of internationally recognized human rights
Coordinator for Human Rights and Humanitarian Affairs establish within United States Department of State
Continuous observation and review of human rights and humanitarian affairs with an inclusion concerning coordination of United States foreign policy
Prohibition against discrimination
Respect for human rights and fundamental freedoms without distinction of language, race, religion, or sex
Prohibition of assistance to countries granting sanctuary to international terrorists
Assistance terminated to any government granting sanctuary from prosecution whereas an act has been committed regarding a gross violation of internationally recognized human rights or international terrorism

The International Development and Food Assistance Act of 1977 mandated annual reports better known as Country Reports on Human Rights Practices. The Bureau of Democracy, Human Rights, and Labor published the human rights reports providing insight concerning global humanitarian affairs for countries receiving United States economic security and national security support as authorized by the Foreign Assistance Act of 1961.

== Associated United States Federal Statutes ==
United States public laws relative to the Special Central American Assistance Act of 1979 subsequently under the auspices of the International Security and Development Cooperation Act. The United States statutes were endorsed to encourage harmonious international relations with Latin America.

| Date of Enactment | Public Law Number | Statute Citation | Legislative Bill | U.S. Presidential Administration |
|---|---|---|---|---|
| August 14, 1979 | P.L. 96-53 | 93 Stat. 359 | H.R. 3324 | Jimmy Carter |
| December 16, 1980 | P.L. 96-533 | 94 Stat. 3131 | H.R. 6942 | Jimmy Carter |
| December 29, 1981 | P.L. 97-113 | 95 Stat. 1519 | S. 1196 | Ronald Reagan |
| August 10, 1982 | P.L. 97-233 | 96 Stat. 260 | H.J.Res. 494 | Ronald Reagan |
| July 15, 1983 | P.L. 98-53 | 97 Stat. 287 | H.R. 1271 | Ronald Reagan |
| August 8, 1985 | P.L. 99-83 | 99 Stat. 190 | S. 960 | Ronald Reagan |

== See also ==
- 1979 Salvadoran coup d'état
- Illegal drug trade in Latin America
- Belize–Mexico border
- Jesuit Missionaries in El Salvador
- Belizean–Guatemalan Dispute
- Junta of National Reconstruction
- Central American crisis
- Latin American and Caribbean Group
- Central American migrant caravans
- Latin American debt crisis
- CIA activities in Honduras
- Nicaragua v. United States
- CIA activities in Nicaragua
- Nicaraguan Revolution
- Colombia–Panama border
- Pink tide
- Contras
- Revolutionary Government Junta of El Salvador
- Dirty War
- Salvadoran Civil War
- Federal Republic of Central America
- Sandinista National Liberation Front
- Guatemala–Mexico border
- United States involvement in regime change in Latin America
- Guatemalan Civil War
- United States Missionaries in El Salvador
- Films depicting Latin American military dictatorships
- Alliance for Progress
- Inter-American Development Bank
- Aviation Drug-Trafficking Control Act of 1984
- Mutual Security Act of 1951
- Caribbean Basin Economic Recovery Act of 1983
- Torrijos–Carter Treaties
