= Dairy Diversion Program =

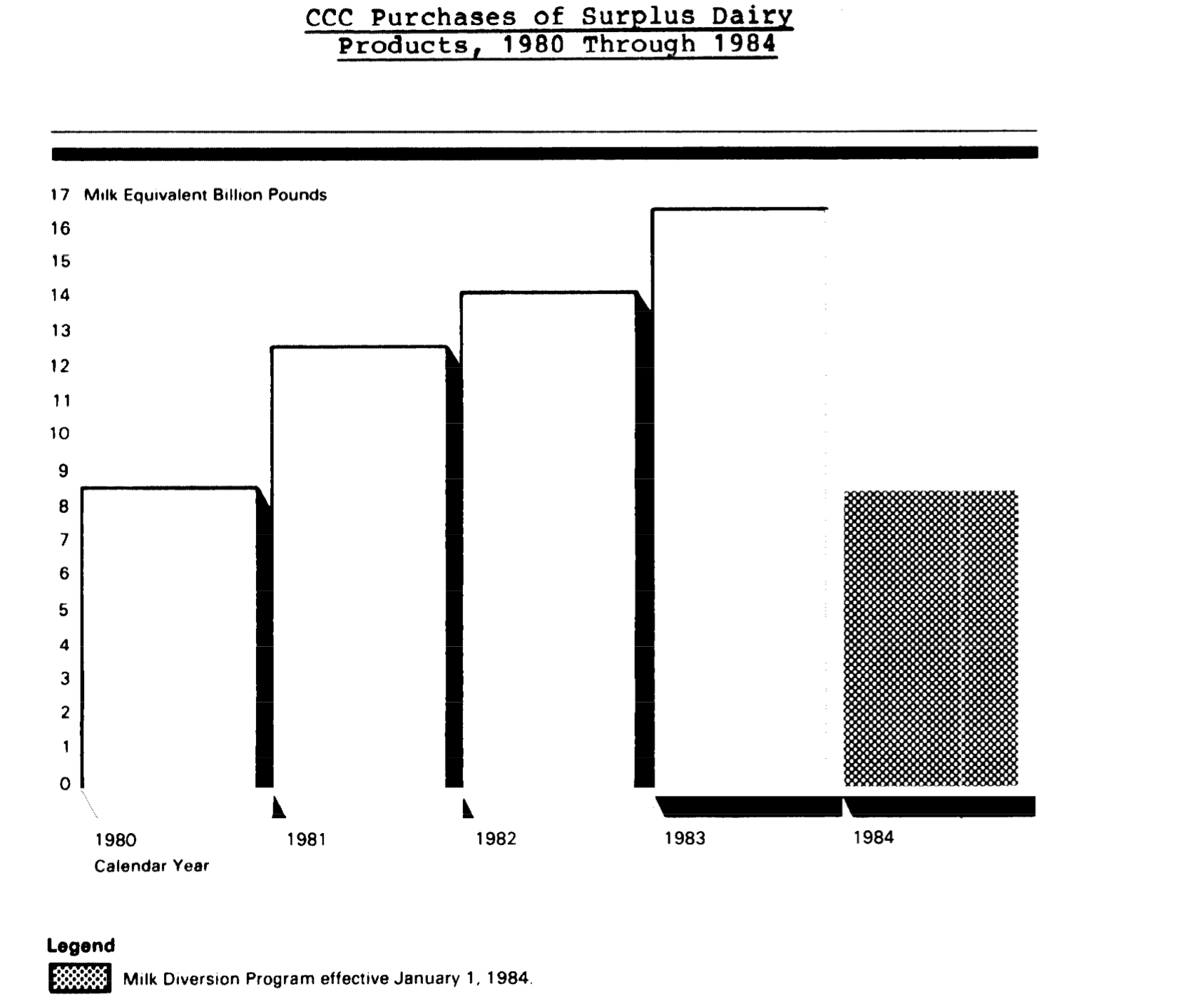
Chart from GAO depicting the purchases of dairy by the CCC from 1980 to 1984.

The Dairy Diversion Program is a voluntary supply control program authorized by the Dairy Production Stabilization Act of 1983 (P.L. 98-180, Title I) of the United States, under which producers in 1984–85 received payments of $10/cwt. of milk, for reducing their milk marketings by between 5% and 30% below an earlier base period.

The United States government has passed around 18 bills involving dairy since 1930. In the 1970s and 1980s, the US government drafted legislation to stabilize dairy prices through one of these dairy bills. During the early 1980s, the US government passed the Dairy Production Stabilization Act of 1983. This act allowed the programs, the Dairy Diversion Program and the Dairy Termination Program, to operate during this period. The Dairy Diversion Program was implemented from January 1984 to March 1985, designed to stabilize milk supply and demand. Afterwards, the Dairy Termination Program followed in 1986, ending around 1987.

== Implementation and results ==
Dairy farmers who participated in the Dairy Diversion Program were given 955 million dollars to reduce dairy prices. Participants received ten dollars for every sales reduction happening in a hundred pounds, a guideline set by a 50-cent per hundredweight mentioned in the 1983 act. 38,000 commercial farmers participated in this program, leading to an estimated reduction of milk production by 3.74 to 4.11 billion pounds. By reducing the amount of dairy surplus in 1984, the program was deemed successful in the short run. However, the GAO estimates that the dairy surplus could have reduced on its own without the dairy diversion program, as there was prior evidence that the 1983 act had already induced a reduction of 2.2 pounds of dairy. Many farmers had indicated they were interested in increasing their milk marketings, leading the dairy industry in 1985 to increase milk production by an additional 7 billion pounds.

== Present day ==
Since the dairy diversion program, the Dairy Termination Program (1986), the Dairy Stabilization Market Program (2014), and Base Excess Programs have all been implemented. In 2019, the Farm Bureau voted against a mandatory supply management program in favor of a flexible one instead, citing that these types of programs would have success in the short-run but not necessarily in the long run.
