= Aviation Drug-Trafficking Control Act of 1984 =

United States federal statute

- Long title: An Act to amend the Federal Aviation Act of 1958 to provide for the revocation of the airman certificates and for additional penalties for the transportation by aircraft of controlled substances, and for other purposes.
- Acronyms (colloquial): ADTCA
- Nicknames: Aviation Drug-Trafficking Control Act
- Enacted by: the 98th United States Congress
- Effective: October 19, 1984

Citations
- Public law: Pub. L. 98–499
- Statutes at Large: 98 Stat. 2312

Codification
- Acts amended: Federal Aviation Act of 1958
- Titles amended: 49 U.S.C.: Transportation
- U.S.C. sections amended: 49 U.S.C. § 40102; 49 U.S.C. § 44703; 49 U.S.C. § 44710; 49 U.S.C. § 46110

Legislative history
- Introduced in the Senate as S. 1146 by Lloyd Bentsen (D–TX) on April 26, 1983; Committee consideration by Senate Commerce, Science, and Transportation, House Public Works and Transportation; Passed the Senate on September 27, 1983 (passed voice vote); Passed the House on July 21, 1984 (393-1, in lieu of H.R. 1580); Reported by the joint conference committee on September 26, 1984; agreed to by the Senate on October 2, 1984 (passed voice vote) and by the House on October 4, 1984 (passed voice vote); Signed into law by President Ronald Reagan on October 19, 1984

Aviation Drug-Trafficking Control Act of 1984 is a United States Federal law amending the Federal Aviation Act of 1958. The statutory law authorized criminal penalties for the unlawful aerial transportation of controlled substances. The Act of Congress mandated the revocation of aircraft registrations and airman certificates by the Federal Aviation Administration whereas an aircraft aviator knowingly engages in the transit of illicitly used drugs. The Act established authority and a statute of limitations for the reissuance of airman certificates by the United States Secretary of Transportation.

The S. 1146 legislation was passed by the 98th U.S. Congressional session and enacted into law by the 40th President of the United States Ronald Reagan on October 19, 1984.

== History ==
In 1982, the United States created the Operation Bahamas, American, Turks and Caicos (OPBAT) initiative harmonizing an interdiction for the narcotic drug trafficking in the West Indies waters. The Bahamas and Turks and Caicos initiative was a cooperative drug interdiction operation supported by an alliance of federal enforcement organizations as coordinated by;

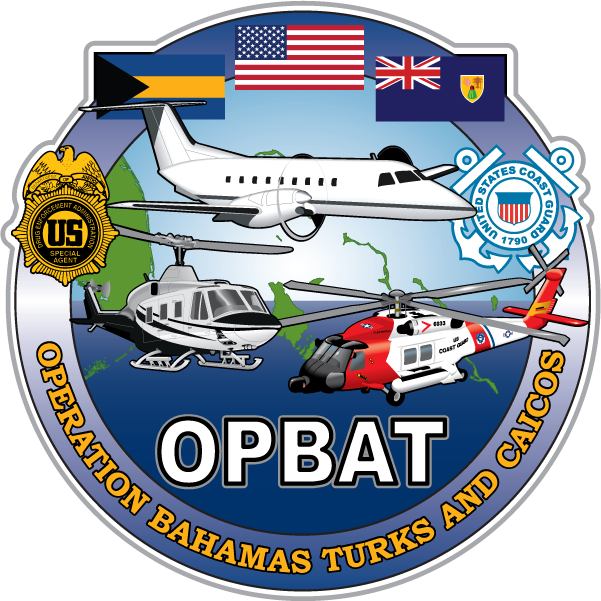
Official crest for OPBAT (Nassau, Bahamas)

☆ Drug Enforcement Administration
☆ Law Enforcement Detachments
☆ Royal Bahamas Police Force
☆ Royal Turks and Caicos Islands Police Force
☆ United States Atlantic Command
☆ United States Coast Guard
☆ United States Coast Guard Tactical Squadron
☆ United States Customs and Border Protection
☆ United States Southern Command

=== Federal Anti-Crime Task Force for Southern Florida ===
In January 1982, the Reagan Administration established the Federal Anti-Crime Task Force for Southern Florida standardizing a multi-jurisdictional law enforcement organization for confronting organized crime in the Caribbean, Gulf of Mexico, and Southeastern United States. The Florida Counter-drug Task Force developed and governed containment measures for the domestic and international enterprises sustaining illegal drug trade activities in the Lucayan Archipelago and Straits of Florida.

In October 1982, United States President Ronald Reagan made a public announcement from the Great Hall of the Robert F. Kennedy Department of Justice Building. The presidential public declaration addressed the federal initiatives related to the interdiction of drug trafficking and organized crime confronting the United States borders and continental maritime boundaries.

=== National Narcotics Border Interdiction System ===
In March 1983, the Reagan Administration announced the formation of the National Narcotics Border Interdiction System (NNBIS). The National Narcotics Border Interdiction established an air, land, and sea anti-smuggling engagement while supporting the federal controlled substance enforcement operations of the South Florida Task Force.

== See also ==
Cannabis & Controlled Substances Schedule I	Illegal drug trade in Latin America
Capital punishment for drug trafficking	Marihuana Tax Act of 1937
Caribbean Basin Economic Recovery Act of 1983	Mexican drug war
Central American crisis	Military Cooperation with Civilian Law Enforcement Agencies Act
Chemical Diversion and Trafficking Act	Multijurisdictional Counterdrug Task Force Training
Drug prohibition law	Nicaraguan Revolution
Foreign Narcotics Kingpin Designation Act	Salvadoran Civil War
Guatemalan Civil War	Special Central American Assistance Act of 1979

Aviation Artifacts in Bahama Islands
Further information: Castle Bank & Trust (Bahamas)
◎ Bimini
◎ Norman's Cay
◎ Spanish Wells
◎ Staniel Cay

== In popular culture ==
The Cinema of the United States developed motion pictures depicting covert activities of drug trafficking traversing America’s boundaries by aviation and ground payload during the last quarter of the 20th century.

Depictions of Drug Trafficking and International Boundary Passage

★ Air America (1990)	★ Mr. Nice (2010)
★ American Gangster (2007)	★ Narcos (2015)
★ American Made (2017)	★ Queen of the South (2016)
★ Blow (2001)	★ Traffic (2000)

== Periodical Bibliography ==
- Brinkley, Joel (May 13, 1984). "Director of Federal Drug Agency Calls Reagan Program 'Liability'". The New York Times.
- Volsky, George (August 8, 1985). "U.S. SAYS SMUGGLERS BRING RECORD COCAINE FLOW". The New York Times.
- Gruson, Lindsey (August 9, 1986). "12 ARE CHARGED WITH SMUGGLING TONS OF COCAINE". The New York Times.
- Brinkley, Joel (September 4, 1986). "4-YEAR FIGHT IN FLORIDA 'JUST CAN'T STOP DRUGS'". The New York Times.
- Gruson, Lindsey (November 20, 1986). "COCAINE SMUGGLER'S STORY SHOWS U.S. NET WITH 'MORE HOLES THAN CHEESE'". The New York Times.
