= Dairy and Tobacco Adjustment Act of 1983 =

- Other short titles: Tobacco Adjustment Act of 1983; Egg Adjustment Act of 1983; Emergency Feed Assistance Act of 1983
- Long title: An Act to stabilize the supply and demand for dairy products, to make modifications in the tobacco production adjustment program, to provide emergency livestock feed assistance, and for other purposes.
- Acronyms (colloquial): DTAA
- Nicknames: Dairy Production Stabilization Act of 1983
- Enacted by: the 98th United States Congress
- Effective: November 29, 1983

Citations
- Public law: 98-180
- Statutes at Large: 97 Stat. 1128

Codification
- Titles amended: 7 U.S.C.: Agriculture
- U.S.C. sections amended: 7 U.S.C. ch. 21 § 509; 7 U.S.C. ch. 21A § 511r; 7 U.S.C. ch. 26, subch. III § 608c; 7 U.S.C. ch. 35, subch. II §§ 1314b, 1314b-1, 1314b-2, 1314c, 1314e, 1379; 7 U.S.C. ch. 35A, subch. I §§ 1421, 1427, 1431; 7 U.S.C. ch. 35A, subch. II §§ 1445, 1445-2; 7 U.S.C. ch. 35A, subch. III § 1446; 7 U.S.C. ch. 76, subch. I §§ 4501, 4502, 4503, 4504, 4505, 4506, 4507, 4508, 4509, 4510, 4511, 4512, 4513, 4514; 7 U.S.C. ch. 76, subch. II §§ 4531, 4532, 4533, 4534, 4535, 4536, 4537, 4538

Legislative history
- Introduced in the House as H.R. 3385 by Thomas J. Huckaby (D-LA) on June 22, 1983; Committee consideration by House Agriculture, Senate Agriculture, Nutrition, and Forestry; Passed the House on July 19, 1983 (312-97); Passed the Senate on October 7, 1983 (47-25, in lieu of S. 1529); Reported by the joint conference committee on November 16, 1983; agreed to by the Senate on November 17, 1983 (Agreed Voice Vote) and by the House on November 18, 1983 (Agreed Unanimous Consent); Signed into law by President Ronald Reagan on November 29, 1983

The Dairy and Tobacco Adjustment Act of 1983 (P.L. 98–180) is a United States federal law.

== Dairy Production Stabilization Act ==
Title I, known as the Dairy Production Stabilization Act of 1983, authorized a voluntary Dairy Diversion Program, which was operated between January 1984 and March 1985. Producers who elected to participate in the program and reduce their milk marketings by between 5% and 30% below their base production were paid $10 per hundred pounds (cwt.) for these reductions. For a 16-month period (12/1/83- 3/31/85), all dairy farmers were assessed 50¢/cwt. on all milk marketed to help defray the cost of the diversion program.

Also, Title I authorized a national dairy promotion program (or, check-off program) for generic dairy product promotion, research and nutrition education. This self-help program is funded through a permanent 15¢/cwt. assessment on all milk production, and is administered by a board of dairy farmers who are appointed by the Secretary of Agriculture.

== Tobacco Adjustment Act ==
Title II was designated the Tobacco Adjustment Act of 1983. Title II provided for reduced levels of price support for tobacco, the prohibition of lease and transfer of flue-cured quota, the mandatory sale of allotments and quotas by nonfarming entities, the required inspection of imported tobacco, and various other modifications to the tobacco programs.
