= Sherwood Act =

The Sherwood Act of May 11, 1912 was the first important United States pension law in the 20th century. It awarded pensions to all veterans. Veterans of the U.S.-Mexican War and Union veterans of the Civil War could receive pensions automatically at age 62, regardless of disability.
