= Commodity Distribution Reform Act and WIC Amendments of 1987 =

The Commodity Distribution Reform Act and WIC Amendments of 1987 (P.L. 100-237) (January 8, 1988) established a free-standing law requiring the USDA to improve the distribution and quality of commodities donated to child nutrition programs. It also established a foodbank demonstration project making use of Section 32 agricultural surplus commodities, amended the National School Lunch Act (P.L. 79-396) to permit certain pilot projects receiving cash in lieu of commodities or commodity letters of credit to continue receiving them, and amended the Child Nutrition Act of 1966 (P.L. 89-642) to make a variety of changes to the WIC program to expand coordination with other programs, conduct studies, and convert certain food funding to use for administrative costs.
