= Agricultural Fair Practices Act of 1967 =

- Long title: An Act to prohibit unfair trade practices affecting producers of agricultural products, and for other purposes.
- Enacted by: the 90th United States Congress
- Effective: April 16, 1968

Citations
- Public law: 90-288
- Statutes at Large: 82 Stat. 93

Codification
- Titles amended: 7 U.S.C.: Agriculture
- U.S.C. sections amended: Chapter 56 § 2301

Legislative history
- Introduced in the Senate as S. 109; Signed into law by President Lyndon B. Johnson on April 16, 1968

The Agricultural Fair Practices Act of 1967 (P.L. 90-288) was enacted to protect farmers from retaliation by handlers (buyers of their products) because the farmers are members of a cooperative. The act permits farmers to file complaints with USDA, which can then institute court proceedings, if they believe their rights under the law have been violated. Several bills have been introduced in recent years on behalf of producers (among them, some poultry growers who have contracts with large companies) to give them more bargaining power under the Act, which, some producers contend, lacks adequate enforcement authorities.

== See also ==
Grain Inspection, Packers and Stockyards Administration
Packers and Stockyards Act
