= Military Cooperation with Civilian Law Enforcement Agencies Act =

- Long title: An Act to authorize appropriations for fiscal year 1982 for the Armed Forces for procurement, for research, development, test, and evaluation, and for operation and maintenance, to prescribe personnel strengths for such fiscal year for the Armed Forces and for civilian employees of the Department of Defense, to authorize appropriations for such fiscal year for civil defense, and for other purposes.
- Acronyms (colloquial): MCCLEAA
- Nicknames: Department of Defense Authorization Act, 1982
- Enacted by: the 97th United States Congress
- Effective: January 1, 1982

Citations
- Public law: Pub. L. 97–86
- Statutes at Large: 95 Stat. 1099 aka 95 Stat. 1114

Codification
- Titles amended: 10 U.S.C.: Armed Forces
- U.S.C. sections created: 10 U.S.C. ch. 15 § 271 et seq.

Legislative history
- Introduced in the Senate as S. 815 by John Tower (R–TX) on March 26, 1981; Committee consideration by Senate Armed Services; Passed the Senate on May 14, 1981 (92-1); Passed the House on July 16, 1981 (354-63, in lieu of H.R. 3519); Reported by the joint conference committee on October 29, 1981; agreed to by the Senate on November 5, 1981 (Agreed Voice Vote) and by the House on November 17, 1981 (335-61); Signed into law by President Ronald Reagan on December 1, 1981

The Military Cooperation with Civilian Law Enforcement Agencies Act is a United States federal law enacted in 1981 that allows the United States Armed Forces to cooperate with domestic and foreign law enforcement agencies. Operations in support of law enforcement include assistance in counterdrug operations, assistance for civil disturbances, special security operations, counter-terrorism, explosive ordnance disposal (EOD), and similar activities. Constitutional and statutory restrictions and corresponding directives and regulations limit the type of support provided in this area. The legislation allows the U.S. military to give law enforcement agencies access to its military bases and its military equipment. The legislation was promoted during the Presidency of Ronald Reagan in the context of the war on drugs, and is considered a part of a general trend towards the militarization of police.

The Act was known as Public Law 97-86 and is codified at title 10 of the United States Code, Chapter 18.

== See also ==
- Aviation Drug-Trafficking Control Act of 1984
- Militarization of police
- Posse Comitatus Act
- AFSPA
