= Narcotics Manufacturing Act of 1960 =

Federal declaration

- Long title: An Act to discharge more effectively obligations of the United States under certain conventions and protocols relating to the institution of controls over the manufacture of narcotic drugs, and for other purposes.
- Enacted by: the 86th United States Congress
- Effective: January 1, 1961

Citations
- Public law: 86-429
- Statutes at Large: 74 Stat. 55

Codification
- Titles amended: 21 U.S.C.: Food and Drugs; 26: Internal Revenue Code
- U.S.C. sections created: 21 U.S.C. ch. 11 §§ 501-517
- U.S.C. sections amended: I.R.C. ch. 39 §§ 4702, 4731

Legislative history
- Introduced in the House as H.R. 529 by Frank M. Karsten (D-MO) on August 26, 1959; Committee consideration by House Ways and Means, Senate Finance; Passed the House on September 9, 1959 (Passed); Passed the Senate on March 28, 1960 (Passed) with amendment; House agreed to Senate amendment on April 11, 1960 (Agreed); Signed into law by President Dwight D. Eisenhower on April 22, 1960

Narcotics Manufacturing Act of 1960 is a federal declaration affirming the United States commitment to international convention protocols constricting the non-medical and non-scientific manufacturing of narcotic drugs. The Act of Congress recognizes the Convention for Limiting the Manufacture and Regulating the Distribution of Narcotic Drugs and 1948 Protocol establishing deterrents for the chemical synthesis and dispensation of illicit drugs. The public law exemplifies a scientific class of narcotic drugs produced from the natural product of the coca leaf and opium poppy.

== Provisions of the Act ==
The codified law was drafted as twenty-two sections providing administrative jurisdiction for basic scientific class of opiates and opioids.

21 U.S.C. §§ 501-502

- Short Title
- Necessity for Legislation
- Definitions

26 U.S.C. §§ 4702 & 4731

- Amendments to Internal Revenue Code of 1954

21 U.S.C. §§ 503-512

- Notifications, Findings, and Decisions under The 1948 Protocol
- Modification of List of Basic Narcotic Drugs
- Restrictions on the Manufacture of Narcotic Drugs
- Licenses to Manufacture Narcotic Drugs
- Revocation or Suspension of Licenses
- Authority to Seize Narcotic Drugs, Order Forms, and Tax Stamps
- Manufacturing Quotas for Basic Classes of Narcotic Drugs
- Exception from Applicability of License and Quota Provisions
- Regulation with Respect to Persons who Manufacture Narcotic Precursors
- Certain Procedures for Judicial Review

21 U.S.C. §§ 513-517

- Amendment to Law with Respect to Exportation of Narcotic Drugs
- Authorizing Importation of Narcotic Drugs as to Certain Persons
- Enforcement and Authority to Delegate Functions
- Penal Provisions
- Procedure and Presumptions
- Applicability of Act

21 U.S.C. § 501

- Separability of Invalid Provisions
- Effective Date

== Repeal of Narcotics Manufacturing Act ==
The 1960 United States public law was repealed by the enactment of Comprehensive Drug Abuse Prevention and Control Act on October 27, 1970.

== See also ==
1946 Lake Success Protocol
Narcotic Drugs Import and Export Act
Narcotic Farms Act of 1929
Single Convention on Narcotic Drugs
