= History of drug prohibition in the United States =

Drugs in the United States were largely unregulated until the early 20th century. Opium had been used to relieve pain since the Revolutionary War, but the use of opiates in the civilian population began to increase dramatically in the late 1800s, and cocaine use became prevalent. Alcohol consumption steadily grew, as did the temperance movement, well-supported by the middle class, promoting moderation or abstinence. The practice of smoking cannabis began to be noticed in the early 1900s. State and local governments began enacting drug laws in the mid-1800s. Under the US Constitution, the authority to control dangerous drugs exists separately at both the federal and state level. Federal drug legislation arrived after the turn of the century.

== 1800s: Largely unregulated ==
The 1880s saw opiate addiction surge among housewives, doctors, and Civil War veterans, creating America's "first opioid crisis". By the end of the century, an estimated one in 200 Americans were addicted to opiates, 60% of them women, typically white and middle- to upper-class. Medical journals of the later 1800s were replete with warnings against overprescription. As medical advances presented better treatment options, prescribed opiate use began to decline. Meanwhile, opium smoking remained popular among Chinese immigrant laborers, thousands of whom had arrived during the California gold rush. The public face of opiate use began to change, from affluent white Americans, to "Chinese, gamblers, and prostitutes".

During this period, states and municipalities began enacting laws banning or regulating certain drugs. In Pennsylvania, an anti-morphine law was passed in 1860. In 1875, San Francisco enacted an anti-opium ordinance, vigorously enforced, imposing stiff fines and jail for visiting opium dens. The rationale held that "many women and young girls, as well as young men of a respectable family, were being induced to visit the Chinese opium-smoking dens, where they were ruined morally and otherwise." The law catered to resentment towards the Chinese laborer population who were being accused of taking jobs; other uses of opiates or other drugs were unaffected. Similar laws were enacted in other states and cities. The federal government became involved, selectively raising the import tariff on the smoking grade of opium. None of these measures proved effective in significantly reducing opium use. In the following years, opioids, cocaine, and cannabis were associated with various ethnic minorities and targeted in other local jurisdictions.

== 1900-1970: Regulation increases ==
In 1906, the Pure Food and Drug Act, also known as the Wiley Act, addressed problems with tainted and adulterated food in the growing industrial food system, and with drug quality, by mandating ingredient labels and prohibiting false or misleading labeling. For drugs, a listing of active ingredients was required; a set of drugs deemed addictive or dangerous, that included opium, morphine, cocaine, caffeine, and cannabis, was specified. Oversight of the act was assigned to the US Department of Agriculture's Bureau of Chemistry, which evolved into the Food and Drug Administration in 1930.

In 1908, Hamilton Wright was appointed by President Theodore Roosevelt (1901-1909) as one of three United States Opium Commissioners; a physician previously involved in medical research, he embraced this unexpected political opportunity and came to be known as the "father of American narcotic laws." His wife, Elizabeth Washburn Wright, carried on much of his anti-opium campaign after his death in 1917.

On February 9, 1909, the Smoking Opium Exclusion Act, "to prohibit the importation and use of opium for other than medicinal purposes", became the first US federal law to ban the non-medical use of a drug. This was soon followed by the Harrison Narcotics Tax Act of 1914, that regulated and taxed the production, importation, and distribution of opiates and coca products. Amending the Smoking Opium Exclusion Act, the Anti-Heroin Act of 1924 specifically outlawed the manufacture, importation and sale of heroin.

During World War I (1914–1918), soldiers were commonly treated with morphine, giving rise to addiction among veterans. An international wartime focus on military use of opiates and cocaine for medical treatment and performance enhancement, and concern over potential abuse, led to the global adoption of the International Opium Convention, through its incorporation into the Treaty of Versailles in 1919, with administration by the newly established League of Nations. The treaty, originally formulated in 1912 but not widely implemented, became the basis of current international drug control policy. It was initially concerned with regulating the free trade of drugs, without affecting production or use, and in 1920, it established the Opium Advisory Committee (OAC). The US, one of the most prohibitionist countries, felt these provisions did not go far enough in restricting drugs.

In 1919, the 18th Amendment to the US Constitution was ratified, prohibiting the manufacture, sale and transportation of "intoxicating liquors", with exceptions for religious and medical use. To enforce the amendment, Congress passed the National Prohibition Act, also known as the Volstead Act. The Prohibition Bureau Narcotics Division, which enforced the Harrison Act, was overseen by Levi G. Nutt, the 1st narcotics commissioner of the United States. By the 1930s, the policy was seen as a failure: production and consumption of alcohol persisted, organized crime flourished in the alcohol black market, and tax revenue, particularly needed after the start of the Great Depression in 1929, was lost. Prohibition was repealed by passage of the 21st Amendment in 1933, with President Franklin D. Roosevelt (1933–1945) asking Americans not to abuse "this return to personal freedom."

In 1922, the Narcotic Drugs Import and Export Act broadened federal regulation of opiates and coca products by prohibiting import and export for non-medical use, and established the Federal Narcotics Control Board (FNCB) to administrate.

=== Anslinger era begins ===
The Federal Bureau of Narcotics (FBN) was established as an agency of the US Department of the Treasury by an act of June 14, 1930, with Harry J. Anslinger replacing Levi G. Nutt (who left under scandal) to be appointed as commissioner, a position he held for 32 years, until 1962. Anslinger supported Prohibition and the criminalization of all drugs, and spearheaded anti-drug policy campaigns. He did not support a public health and treatment approach, instead urging courts to "jail offenders, then throw away the key." He has been characterized as the first architect of the punitive war on drugs. According to a report prepared for the Senate of Canada, Anslinger was "utterly devoted to prohibition and the control of drug supplies at the source" and is "widely recognized as having had one of the more powerful impacts on the development of US drug policy, and, by extension, international drug control into the early 1970s."

During his three decades heading the FBN, Anslinger zealously and effectively pursued harsh drug penalties, with a particular focus on cannabis. He used his stature as the head of a federal agency to draft legislation, discredit critics, discount medical opinion and scientific findings, and convince lawmakers. Publicly, he used the media and speaking engagements to introduce hyperbolic messages about the evils of drug use. In the 1930s, he referred to a collection of news reports of horrific crimes, making unsubstantiated claims attributing them to drugs, particularly cannabis. He announced that youth become "slaves" to cannabis, "continuing addiction until they deteriorate mentally, become insane, turn to violent crime and murder." He promoted a racialized view of drug use, saying that blacks and Latinos were the primary abusers. In Congressional testimony, he declared "of all the offenses committed against the laws of this country, the narcotic addict is the most frequent offender." He was also an effective administrator and diplomat, attending international drug conferences and steadily expanding the FBN's influence.

In 1935, the New York Times reported on President Roosevelt's public support of the Uniform State Narcotic Drug Act under the headline, "Roosevelt Asks Narcotic War Aid". The Uniform Law Commission developed the act to address the 1914 Harrison Act's lack of state-level enforcement provisions, creating a model law reflecting the Harrison Act that states could adopt to replace the existing patchwork of state laws. Anslinger and the FBN were centrally involved in drafting the act, and in convincing states to adopt it.

=== Cannabis effectively outlawed, prescription drugs ===
With the passage of the Marihuana Tax Act of 1937, federal law reflected state law – by 1936, the non-medical use of cannabis had been banned in every state. That year, the first two arrests for tax non-payment under the act, for possession of a quarter-ounce (7g), and trafficking of four pounds (1.8 kg), resulted in sentences of nearly 18 months and four years respectively. The American Medical Association (AMA) had opposed the tax act on grounds that it unduly affected the medical use of cannabis. The AMA's legislative counsel, a physician, testified that the claims about cannabis addiction, violence and overdoses were not supported by evidence. Scholars have posited that the act was orchestrated by powerful business interests – Andrew Mellon, Randolph Hearst, and the Du Pont family – to head off cheap competition to pulp and timber and plastics from the hemp industry. (Note: Various sources discussed this claim. Despite media reports at the time touting hemp as the new wonder fiber, harvesting and processing technology weren't sufficiently developed to compete commercially.) After the act, cannabis research and medical testing became rare.

In 1939, New York City Mayor Fiorello LaGuardia, an opponent of the Marihuana Tax Act, formed the LaGuardia Committee to conduct the first US in-depth study of cannabis use. The report, produced by the New York Academy of Medicine and released in 1944, systematically contradicted government claims, finding that cannabis is not physically addictive, and its use does not lead to using other drugs or to crime. The FBN's Anslinger branded the study "unscientific", denounced all involved, and disrupted other cannabis studies at the time.

In the late 1930s, questions emerged from the League of Nations' Opium Advisory Committee concerning the focus on drug prohibition over public health measures such as mental health treatment, drug dispensaries and education. Anslinger, backed by his Canadian counterpart and policy ally, Charles Henry Ludovic Sharman, successfully argued against this view, and kept the focus on increasing global prohibition and supply control measures.

In 1938, the Federal Food, Drug, and Cosmetic Act required that non-narcotic drugs be labeled for safe use. The FDA determined that certain drugs, including amphetamines, commercialized in the later 1930s, and barbiturates, were unsafe to use without medical supervision and could only be obtained by doctor's prescription. This marked the beginning of the federal distinction between over-the-counter and prescription drugs (made law in the Durham–Humphrey Amendment of 1951).

=== Amphetamines, harsher penalties, international obligations ===
During World War II (1939–1945), in addition to the widespread use of morphine, amphetamines entered military use to combat fatigue and improve morale. In the US, the Benzedrine brand was widely used in the military, and quickly became popular in the public for a variety of medical and recreational applications. Beginning in 1943, American soldiers could buy Benzedrine directly from the army on demand. Post-war, amphetamines were promoted as mood elevators and diet pills to great success; by 1945, an estimated 750 million tablets a year were being produced in the US, enough to provide a million people with a daily supply, a trend that grew during the 1950s and 1960s.

Having failed to preserve world peace, the League of Nations ended post-war, transferring responsibilities to its successor, the United Nations. Anslinger, supported by Sharman, successfully campaigned to ensure that law enforcement and the prohibitionist view remained central to international drug policy. With the 1946 Lake Success Protocol, he helped to make sure that law enforcement was represented on the UN's new drug policy Supervisory Body (today's International Narcotics Control Board), and that it did not fall under a public health-oriented agency like the WHO.

In the early 1950s, responding to "white suburban grassroots movements" concerned about dealers preying on teenagers, liberal politicians at state level cracked down on drugs. California, Illinois, and New York passed the first mandatory minimum sentences for drug offenses; Congress followed with the Boggs Act of 1951, creating the first federal mandatory minimums for drugs. The act unified penalties for the Narcotic Drugs Import and Export Act and the Marihuana Tax Act, effectively criminalizing cannabis. Anslinger testified in favor of the inclusion of cannabis, describing a "stepping-stone" path leading from cannabis to harder drugs and crime. First-offense possession of cannabis carried a 2–10-year minimum and a fine of up to $20,000. This marked a change in Congress's approach to mandatory minimums, increasing their number, severity, and the crimes they covered. According to the United States Sentencing Commission, reporting in 2012: "Before 1951, mandatory minimum penalties typically punished offenses concerning treason, murder, piracy, rape, slave trafficking, internal revenue collection, and counterfeiting. Today, the majority of convictions under statutes carrying mandatory minimum penalties relate to controlled substances, firearms, identity theft, and child sex offenses.".

In 1961, the Single Convention on Narcotic Drugs became the first of three UN treaties that together form the legal framework for international drug control, and require that domestic drug laws in member countries comply with the conventions. The Single Convention unified existing international drug agreements, and limited possession and use of opiates, cannabis and cocaine to "medicinal and scientific purposes", prohibiting recreational use. Sixty-four countries initially joined; it was ratified and came into force in the US in 1967. The Convention on Psychotropic Substances of 1971 added synthetic, prescription and hallucinogenic drugs. The United Nations Convention Against Illicit Traffic in Narcotic Drugs and Psychotropic Substances of 1988 addressed international drug trafficking and "criminalized the entire drug market chain, from cultivation/production to shipment, sale, and possession."

In 1968, President Lyndon B. Johnson (1963–69) decided that the government needed to make an effort to curtail the social unrest that blanketed the country at the time. He focused on illegal drug use, an approach that was in line with expert opinion on the subject at the time. In the 1960s, it was believed that at least half of the crime in the US was drug-related, and this estimate grew as high as 90% in the next decade. He created the Reorganization Plan of 1968 which merged the Bureau of Narcotics and the Bureau of Drug Abuse Control to form the Bureau of Narcotics and Dangerous Drugs within the Department of Justice.

=== Federal drug schedule system introduced ===
The Richard Nixon presidency (1969–74) incorporated his predecessor's anti-drug initiative in a tough-on-crime platform. In his 1968 presidential nomination acceptance speech, Nixon promised, "Our new Attorney General will ... launch a war against organized crime in this country. ... will be an active belligerent against the loan sharks and the numbers racketeers that rob the urban poor. ... will open a new front against the filth peddlers and the narcotics peddlers who are corrupting the lives of the children of this country." In a 1969 special message to Congress, he identified drug abuse as "a serious national threat".

On October 27, 1970, Nixon signed into law the Comprehensive Drug Abuse Prevention and Control Act of 1970, establishing his approach to drug control. The act largely repealed mandatory minimum sentences: simple possession was reduced from a felony to a misdemeanor, the first offense carried a maximum of one year in prison, and judges had the latitude to assign probation, parole or dismissal. Penalties for trafficking were increased, up to life depending on the quantity and type of drug. Funding was authorized for the Department of Health, Education and Welfare to provide treatment, rehabilitation and education. Additional federal drug agents were provided, and a "no-knock" power was instituted, that allowed entry into homes without warning to prevent evidence from being destroyed. Licensing and stricter reporting and record-keeping for pharmaceutical manufacturers and distributors occurred under the act. Title II of Act, the Controlled Substances Act (CSA), helped align US law with the UN Single Convention, with "many of the provisions of the CSA ... enacted by Congress for the specific purpose of ensuring U.S. compliance with the treaty." The CSA's five drug Schedules, an implementation of the Single Convention's four schedule system, categorized drugs based on medical value and potential for abuse.

Under the new drug schedules, cannabis was provisionally placed by the administration in the most restrictive Schedule I, "until the completion of certain studies now underway to resolve the issue." As mandated by the CSA, Nixon appointed the National Commission on Marijuana and Drug Abuse, known as the Shafer Commission, to investigate.

== 1971–present: The "war on drugs" ==
On May 27, 1971, after a trip to Vietnam, two congressmen, Morgan F. Murphy (Democrat) and Robert H. Steele (Republican), released a report describing a "rapid increase in heroin addiction within the United States military forces in South Vietnam". They estimated that "as many as 10 to 15 percent of our servicemen are addicted to heroin in one form or another." On June 6, a New York Times article, "It's Always A Dead End on 'Scag Alley'", cited the Murphy-Steele report in a discussion of heroin addiction. The article stated that, in the US, "the number of addicts is estimated at 200,000 to 250,000, only about one‐tenth of 1 per cent of the population but troublesome out of all proportion." It also noted, "Heroin is not the only drug problem in the United States. 'Speed' pills – among them, amphetamines – are another problem, and not least in the suburbs where they are taken by the housewife (to cure her of the daily 'blues') and by her husband (to keep his weight down)."

On June 17, 1971, Nixon presented to Congress a plan for expanded anti-drug abuse measures. He painted a dire picture: "Present efforts to control drug abuse are not sufficient in themselves. The problem has assumed the dimensions of a national emergency. ... If we cannot destroy the drug menace in America, then it will surely in time destroy us." His strategy involved both treatment and interdiction: "I am proposing the appropriation of additional funds to meet the cost of rehabilitating drug users, and I will ask for additional funds to increase our enforcement efforts to further tighten the noose around the necks of drug peddlers, and thereby loosen the noose around the necks of drug users." He singled out heroin and broadened the scope beyond the US: "To wage an effective war against heroin addiction, we must have international cooperation. In order to secure such cooperation, I am initiating a worldwide escalation in our existing programs for the control of narcotics traffic."

Later the same day, Nixon held a news conference at the White House, where he described drug abuse as "America's public enemy number one." He announced, "In order to fight and defeat this enemy, it is necessary to wage a new, all-out offensive. ... This will be a worldwide offensive dealing with the problems of sources of supply ... It will be government wide, pulling together the nine different fragmented areas within the government in which this problem is now being handled, and it will be nationwide in terms of a new educational program." Nixon also stated that the problem wouldn't end with the addiction of soldiers in the Vietnam War. He pledged to ask Congress for a minimum of $350 million for the anti-drug effort (when he took office in 1969, the federal drug budget was $81 million).

The news media focused on Nixon's militaristic tone, describing his announcement with variations of the phrase "war on drugs". The day after Nixon's press conference, the Chicago Tribune proclaimed, "Nixon Declares War on Narcotics Use in US". In England, The Guardian headlined, "Nixon declares war on drug addicts." The US anti-drug campaign came to be commonly referred to as the war on drugs; the term also became used to refer to any government's prosecution of a US-style prohibition-based drug policy.

Facing reelection, with drug control as a campaign centerpiece, Nixon formed the Office of Drug Abuse Law Enforcement (ODALE) in late 1971. ODALE, armed with new federal enforcement powers, began orchestrating drug raids nationwide to improve the administration's watchdog reputation. In a private conversation while helicoptering over Brooklyn, Nixon was reported to have commented, "You and I care about treatment. But those people down there, they want those criminals off the streets." From 1972 to 1973, ODALE performed 6,000 drug arrests in 18 months, the majority of the arrested black.

In 1972, the Shafer Commission released its report, "Marihuana: A Signal of Misunderstanding", comprising a review of the medical literature and a national drug survey. It recommended decriminalization for personal possession and use of small amounts of cannabis, and prohibition only of supply. The conclusion was not acted on by Nixon or by Congress. Citing the Shafer report, a lobbying campaign from 1973 to 1978, spearheaded by the National Organization for the Reform of Marijuana Laws (NORML), convinced 11 states to decriminalize cannabis for personal use.

In 1973, Nixon created the Drug Enforcement Administration (DEA) by an executive order accepted by Congress, to "establish a single unified command to combat an all-out global war on the drug menace." The agency was charged with enforcing US controlled substances laws and regulations nationally and internationally, coordinating with federal, state and local agencies and foreign governments, and overseeing legally produced controlled substances. The DEA absorbed the Bureau of Narcotics and Dangerous Drugs, ODALE, and other drug-related federal agencies or personnel from them.

=== Nixon's role reviewed ===
Decades later, a controversial quote attributed to John Ehrlichman, Nixon's domestic policy advisor, claimed that the war on drugs was fabricated to undermine the anti-war movement and African-Americans. In a 2016 Harper's cover story, Ehrlichman, who died in 1999, was quoted from journalist Dan Baum's 1994 interview notes: "... by getting the public to associate the hippies with marijuana and blacks with heroin, and then criminalizing both heavily, we could disrupt those communities. We could arrest their leaders, raid their homes, break up their meetings, and vilify them night after night on the evening news. Did we know we were lying about the drugs? Of course we did." The veracity of the quote was challenged by Ehrlichman's children, and Nixon-era officials. In the end, the increasingly punitive reshaping of US drug policy by later administrations was most responsible for creating some of the conditions Ehrlichman described.

In a 2011 commentary, Robert DuPont, Nixon's drug czar, argued that the Comprehensive Drug Abuse Act had represented a degree of drug reform. He noted that the act had rolled back mandatory minimum sentencing and balanced the "long-dominant law enforcement approach to drug policy, known as 'supply reduction'" with an "entirely new and massive commitment to prevention, intervention and treatment, known as 'demand reduction'". Thus, Nixon was not in fact the originator of what came to be called the "war on drugs". During Nixon's term, some 70% of federal anti-drug money was spent on demand-side public health measures, and 30% on supply-side interdiction and punishment, a funding ratio not repeated under subsequent administrations.

The war on drugs under the next two presidents, Gerald Ford (1974–77) and Jimmy Carter (1977–81), was essentially a continuation of their predecessors' policies. Carter's campaign platform included decriminalization of cannabis and an end to federal penalties for possession of up to one ounce. In a 1977 "Drug Abuse Message to the Congress", Carter stated, "Penalties against possession of a drug should not be more damaging to an individual than the use of the drug itself." None of his advocacy was translated into law.

=== Reagan escalation, militarization, and "Just Say No" ===
The presidency of Ronald Reagan (1981–89) saw a significant increase in federal focus on drug interdiction and prosecution. Shortly after his inauguration, Reagan announced, "We're taking down the surrender flag that has flown over so many drug efforts; we're running up a battle flag." From 1980 to 1984, the annual budget of the Federal Bureau of Investigation (FBI) drug enforcement units went from $8 million to $95 million. In 1982, Vice President George H. W. Bush and his aides began pushing for the involvement of the Central Intelligence Agency (CIA) and the US military in drug interdiction efforts.

Early in the Reagan term, First Lady Nancy Reagan, with the help of an advertising agency, began her youth-oriented "Just Say No" anti-drug campaign. Propelled by the First Lady's tireless promotional efforts through the 1980s, "Just Say No" entered the American vernacular. Later research found that the campaign had little or no impact on youth drug use. One striking change attributed to the effort: public perception of drug abuse as America's most serious problem, in the 2–6% range in 1985, rose to 64% in 1989.

In January 1982, Reagan established the South Florida Task Force, chaired by Bush, targeting a surge of cocaine and cannabis entering through the Miami region, and the sharp rise in related crime. The project involved the DEA, the Customs Service, the FBI and other agencies, and Armed Forces ships and planes. It was called the "most ambitious and expensive drug enforcement operation" in US history; critics called it an election year political stunt. By 1986, the task force had made over 15,000 arrests and seized over six million pounds of cannabis and 100,000 pounds of cocaine, doubling cocaine seizures annually – administration officials called it Reagan's biggest drug enforcement success. However, law enforcement agents at the time said their impact was minimal; cocaine imports had increased by 10%, to an estimated 75–80% of America's supply. According to the head of the task force's investigative unit, "Law enforcement just can't stop the drugs from coming in." A Bush spokesperson emphasized disrupting smuggling routes rather than seizure quantities as the measure of success."

In 1984, Reagan signed the Comprehensive Crime Control Act, which included harsher penalties for cannabis cultivation, possession, and distribution. It also established equitable sharing, a new civil asset forfeiture program that allowed state and local law enforcement to share the proceeds from asset seizures made in collaboration with federal agencies. Under the controversial program, up to 80% of seizure proceeds can go to local law enforcement, expanding their budgets. By 2019, $36.5 billion worth of assets had been seized, much of it drug-related, much of it distributed to state and local agencies.

=== Crackdown on crack ===
As the media focused on the emergence of crack cocaine in the early 1980s, the Reagan administration shored up negative public opinion, encouraging the DEA to emphasize the harmful effects of the drug. Stories of "crack whores" and "crack babies" became commonplace. In mid-1986, crack dominated the news. Time declared crack the issue of the year. Newsweek compared the magnitude of the crack story to Vietnam and Watergate. The cocaine overdose deaths of rising basketball star Len Bias, and young NFL football player Don Rogers, both in June, received wide coverage. Riding the wave of public fervor, that October Reagan signed into law much harsher sentencing for crack through the Anti-Drug Abuse Act, commonly known as the Len Bias law. According to historian Elizabeth Hinton, "[Reagan] led Congress in criminalizing drug users, especially African American drug users, by concentrating and stiffening penalties for the possession of the crystalline rock form of cocaine, known as 'crack', rather than the crystallized methamphetamine that White House officials recognized was as much of a problem among low-income white Americans".

The Anti-Drug Abuse Act appropriated an additional $1.7 billion to drug war funding, and established 29 new mandatory minimum sentences for drug offenses (until then, the American legal system had seen 55 minimum sentences in total). Of particular note, the act made sentences for larger amounts of cocaine 100 times more severe for crack than for the powder form. With the 100:1 ratio, conviction in federal court for possession of 5 grams of crack would receive the same 5-year mandatory minimum as possession of 500 grams of powder cocaine. Debate at the time considered whether crack, generally used by Black Americans, was more addictive than the powder form, generally used by whites, comparing the effects of snorting powder cocaine with the briefer, more intense high from smoking crack; pharmacologically, there is no difference between the two. According to the DEA, at first crack "was not fully appreciated as a major threat because it was primarily being consumed by middle class users who were not associated with cocaine addicts ... However, partly because crack sold for as little as $5 a rock, it ultimately spread to less affluent neighborhoods."

Support for Reagan's drug crime legislation was bipartisan. According to historian Hinton, Democrats supported drug legislation as they had since the Johnson administration, though Reagan was a Republican.

Internationally, the Reagan term saw a huge increase in US military anti-drug activity in other countries. The Department of Defense budget for interdiction increased from $4.9 million in 1982 to $397 million by 1987. The DEA also expanded its foreign presence. Countries were encouraged to adopt the same type of punitive drug approach that was in place in the US, with the threat of economic sanctions for non-compliance. The UN Single Convention provided a legal framework, and in 1988, the Convention against Illicit Traffic expanded that framework, working the US-style punitive approach into international law.

By the end of Reagan's presidency in 1989, illicit drugs were more readily available and cheaper than at the start of his first term in 1981.

=== Hard line maintained and a new opioid crisis ===
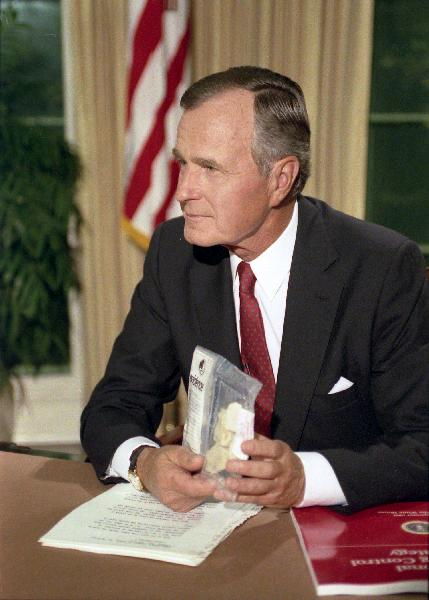
President George H. W. Bush holds up a bag of crack cocaine during his Address to the Nation on National Drug Control Strategy on September 5, 1989.

Next to occupy the Oval Office, Reagan protégé and former VP George H. W. Bush (1989–93) maintained the hard line drawn by his predecessor and former boss. In his first prime time address to the nation, Bush held up a plastic bag of crack "seized a few days ago in a park across the street from the White House" (it was later revealed that DEA agents had to lure the seller to Lafayette Park to make the requested arrest). The administration increased narcotics regulation in the first National Drug Control Strategy, issued by the Office of National Drug Control Policy (ONDCP) in 1989. The director of ONDCP became commonly known as the US drug czar. In the National Defense Authorization Act for 1990–91, Congress included Section 1208 – the 1208 Program, expanded into the 1033 Program in 1996 – authorizing the Department of Defense to transfer surplus military equipment that the DoD determined to be "suitable for use in counter-drug activities", to local law enforcement agencies.

As president, Bill Clinton (1993–2001), seeking to reposition the Democratic Party as tough on crime, dramatically raised the stakes for drug felonies with his signing of the Violent Crime Control and Law Enforcement Act of 1994. The act introduced the federal "three-strikes" provision that mandated life imprisonment for violent offenders with two prior convictions for violent crimes or drugs, and provided billions of dollars in funding for states to expand their prison systems and increase law enforcement. During this period, state and local governments initiated controversial drug policies that demonstrated racial biases, such as the stop-and-frisk police practice in New York City, and state-level "three strikes" felony laws, which began with California in 1994.

During the 1990s, opioid use in the US dramatically rose, leading to the ongoing situation commonly called the opioid epidemic. A loose consensus of observers describe three main phases to date: overprescription of legal opioids beginning in the early to mid-1990s; a rise in heroin use in the later 2000s as prescription opioids became more difficult to obtain; and the rise of more powerful fentanyl and other synthetic opioids around the mid-2010s. Prior to 1990s, the use of opioids to treat chronic pain in the US was limited; some scholars suggest there was hesitation to prescribe opioids due to historical problems with addiction dating back to the 1800s. A critical point in the development of the epidemic is often seen as the release in 1996 of OxyContin (oxicodone) by Purdue Pharma, and the subsequent aggressive and deceptive opioid marketing efforts by Purdue and other pharma companies, conducted without sufficient official oversight. Thus the problem emerged from within the healthcare system: the DEA initially targeted doctors, pharmacists, pill mills, and pharmaceutical companies. As law enforcement cracked down on the pharmaceutical supply, illicit drug trafficking in opioids grew to meet demand.

The George W. Bush (2001–2009) administration maintained the hard line approach. In a TV interview in February 2001, Bush's new attorney general, John Ashcroft, said about the war on drugs, "I want to renew it. I want to refresh it, relaunch it if you will." In 2001, after 9/11 and the Patriot Act, the DEA began highlighting the tie between drug trafficking and international terrorism, gaining the agency expanded funding to increase its global presence.

=== Growing dissent ===
The US incarceration rate peaked in 2008. The US rate was the highest in the world in 2008. Chart is for prisoners per 100,000 population of all ages.

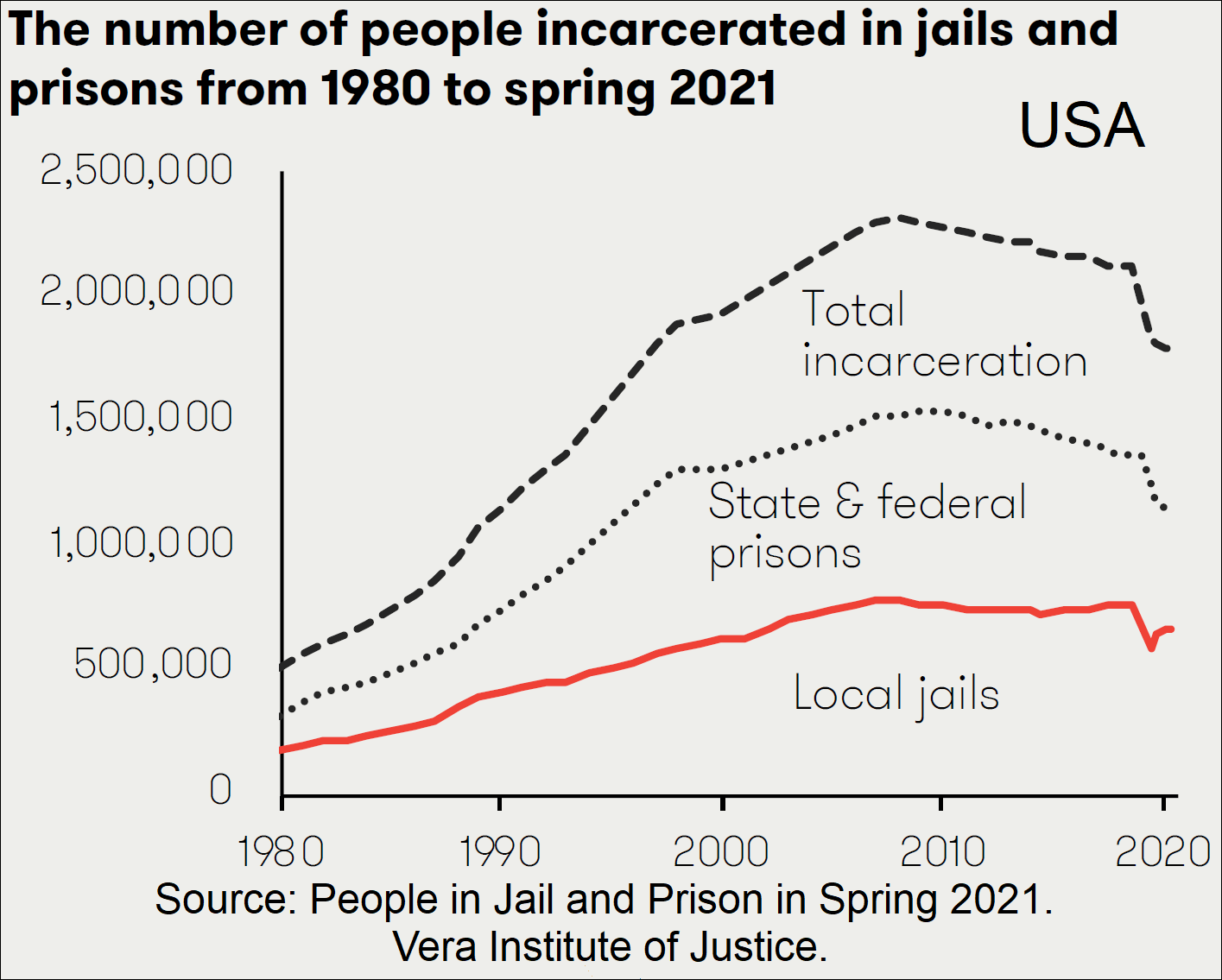
US timeline graphs of number of people incarcerated in jails and prisons

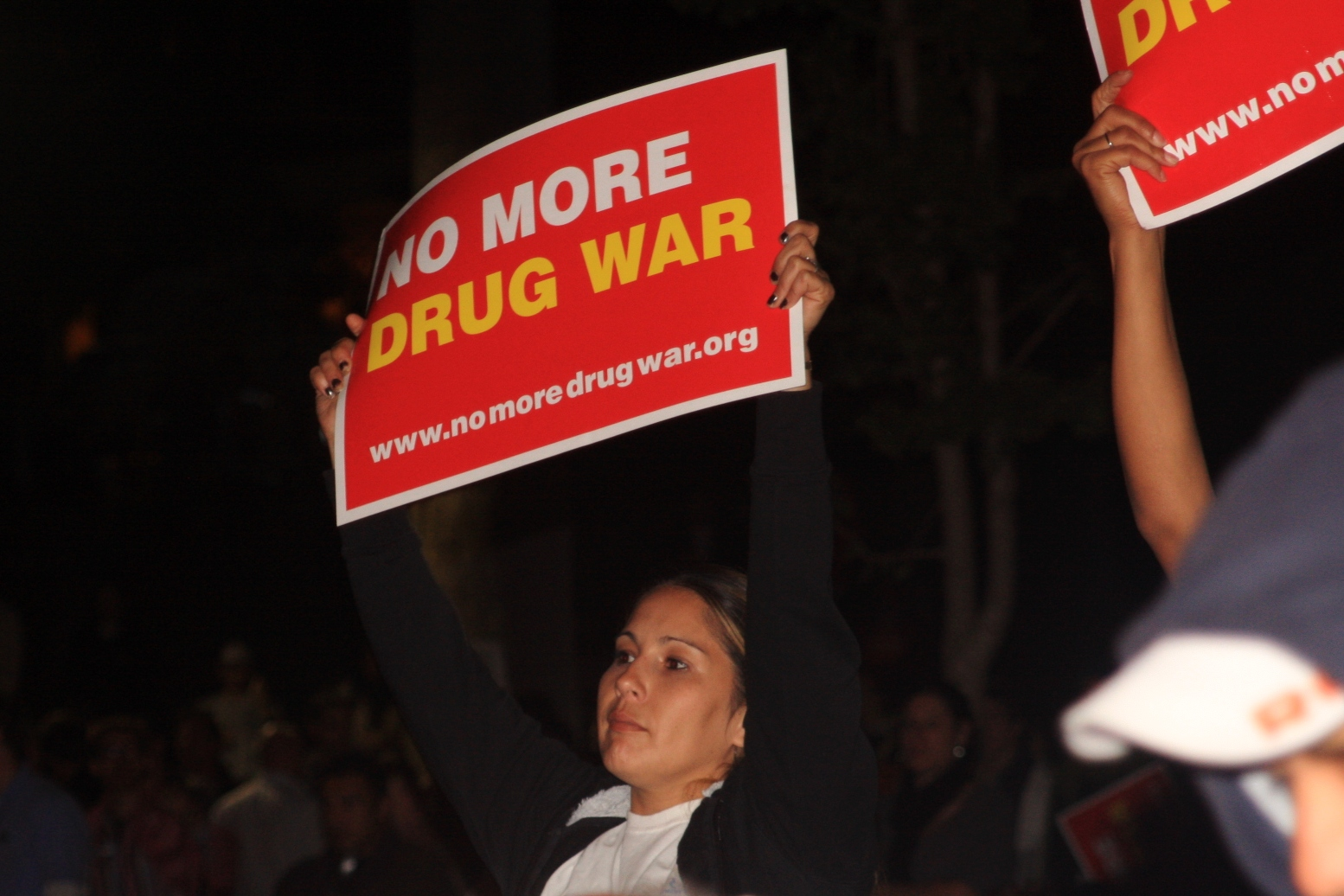
Anti-war on drugs protest in Los Angeles, 2011.

In mid-2001, a report by the American Civil Liberties Union (ACLU), "The Drug War is the New Jim Crow", tied the vastly disproportionate rate of African American incarceration to the range of rights lost once convicted. It stated that, while "whites and blacks use drugs at almost exactly the same rates ... African-Americans are admitted to state prisons at a rate that is 13.4 times greater than whites, a disparity driven largely by the grossly racial targeting of drug laws." Between federal and state laws, those convicted of even simple possession could lose the right to vote, eligibility for educational assistance including loans and work-study programs, custody of their children, and personal property including homes. The report concluded that the cumulative effect of the war on drugs amounted to "the US apartheid, the new Jim Crow". This view was further developed by lawyer and civil rights advocate Michelle Alexander in her 2010 book, The New Jim Crow: Mass Incarceration in the Age of Colorblindness.

In the year 2000, the US drug-control budget reached $18.4 billion, nearly half of which was spent financing law enforcement while only one-sixth was spent on treatment. In the year 2003, 53% of the requested drug control budget was for enforcement, 29% for treatment, and 18% for prevention.

During his presidency, Barack Obama (2009–2017) implemented his "tough but smart" approach to the war on drugs. While he claimed that his method differed from those of previous presidents, in reality, his practices were similar. In May 2009, Gil Kerlikowske, Director of the ONDCP – Obama's drug czar – indicated that the Obama administration did not plan to significantly alter drug enforcement policy, but that it would not use the term "war on drugs", considering it to be "counter-productive". In August 2010, Obama signed the Fair Sentencing Act into law, reducing the 100:1 sentencing disparity between crack and powder cocaine to 18:1 for pending and future cases. In 2013, Obama's Justice Department issued a policy memorandum known as the Cole Memo, stating that it would defer to state laws that authorize the production, distribution and possession of cannabis, "based on assurances that those states will impose an appropriately strict regulatory system."

In 2011, the Global Commission on Drug Policy, an international non-governmental group composed primarily of former heads of state and government, and leaders from various sectors, released a report that stated, "The global war on drugs has failed." It recommended a paradigm shift, to a public health focus, with decriminalization for possession and personal use. Obama's ONDCP did not support the report, stating: "Drug addiction is a disease that can be successfully prevented and treated. Making drugs more available ... will make it harder to keep our communities healthy and safe."

=== International divisions, state-level changes ===
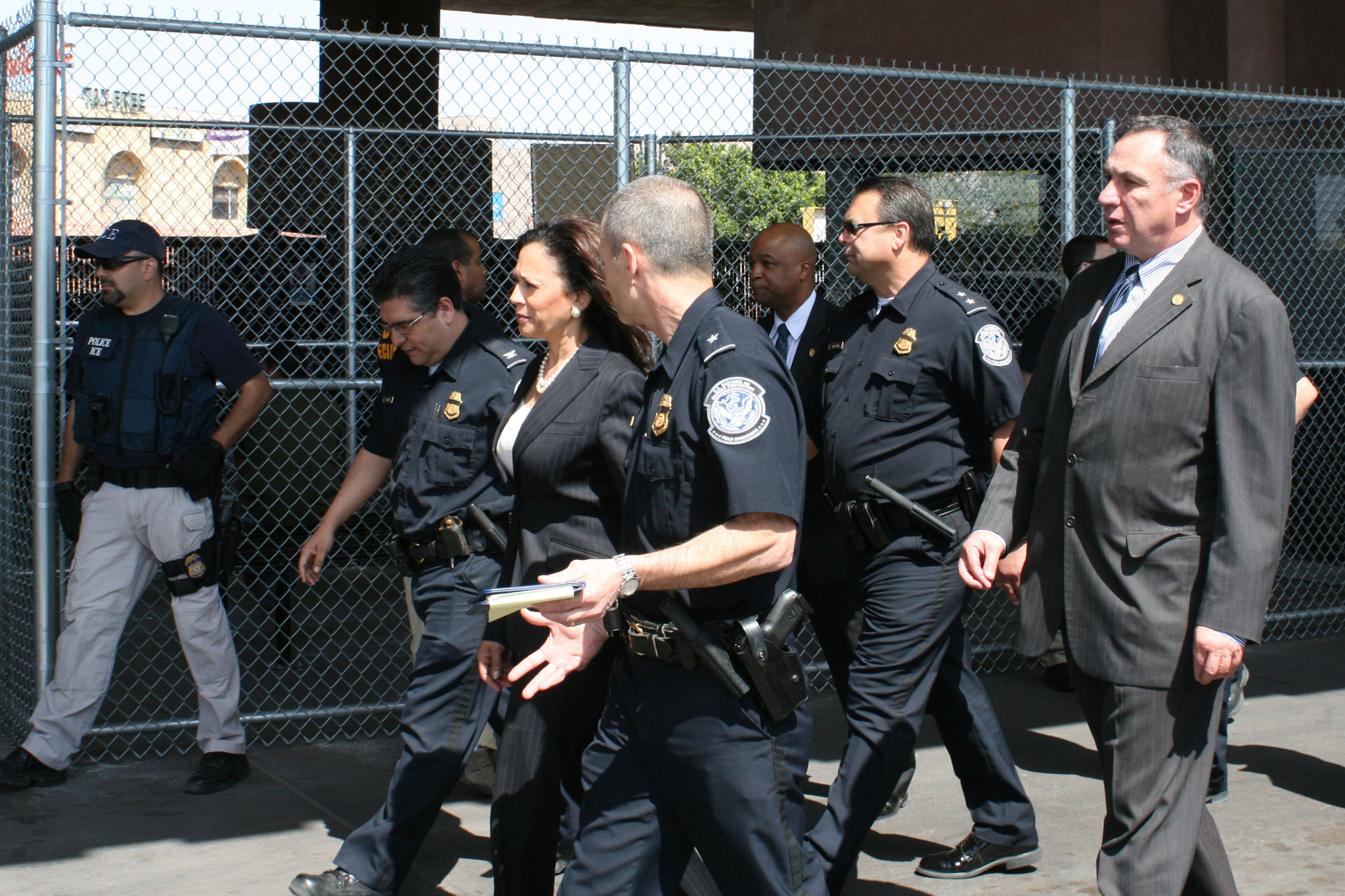
California Attorney General Kamala Harris visiting the U.S.–Mexico border on March 24, 2011, to discuss strategies to combat drug cartels

In May 2012, the ONDCP published "Principles of Modern Drug Policy", broadly focusing on public health, human rights, and criminal justice reform, while targeting drug traffickers. According to ONDCP director Kerlikowske, drug legalization is not the "silver bullet" solution to drug control, and success is not measured by the number of arrests made or prisons built. That month, a joint statement, "For a humane and balanced drug policy", was signed by Italy, Russia, Sweden, the United Kingdom and the US, promoting a combination of "enforcement to restrict the supply of drugs, with efforts to reduce demand and build recovery." Meanwhile, at the state level, 2012 saw Colorado and Washington become the first two states to legalize the recreational use of cannabis with the passage of Amendment 64 and Initiative 502 respectively.

A 2013 ACLU report declared the anti-marijuana crusade a "war on people of color". The report found that "African Americans [were] 3.73 times more likely than whites to be apprehended despite nearly identical usage rates, and marijuana violations accounting for more than half of drug arrests nationwide during the previous decade". Under Obama's policies, nonwhite drug offenders received less excessive criminal sanctions, but by examining criminals as strictly violent or nonviolent, mass incarceration persisted.

In March 2016, the International Narcotics Control Board stated that the UN's international drug treaties do not mandate a "war on drugs" and that the choice is not between "'militarized' drug law enforcement on one hand and the legalization of non-medical use of drugs on the other", health and welfare should be the focus of drug policy. That April, the UN General Assembly Special Session (UNGASS) on the "World Drug Problem" was held. The Wall Street Journal assessed the attendees' positions as "somewhat" in two camps: "Some European and South American countries as well as the U.S. favored softer approaches. Eastern countries such as China and Russia and most Muslim nations like Iran, Indonesia and Pakistan remained staunchly opposed." The outcome document recommended treatment, prevention and other public health measures, and committed to "intensifying our efforts to prevent and counter" drug production and trafficking, through, "inter alia, more effective drug-related crime prevention and law enforcement measures."

Under President Donald Trump (2017–2021), Attorney General Jeff Sessions reversed the previous Justice Department's cannabis policies, rescinding the Cole Memo that deferred federal enforcement in states where cannabis had been legalized He instructed federal prosecutors to "charge and pursue the most serious, readily provable offense" in drug cases, regardless of whether mandatory minimum sentences applied, which could trigger mandatory minimums for lower-level charges. With cannabis legalized to some degree in over 30 states, Sessions' directive was seen by both Democrats and Republicans as a rogue throwback action, and there was a bipartisan outcry. Trump fired Sessions in 2018 over other issues.

=== Some policy reversal attempts and successes ===
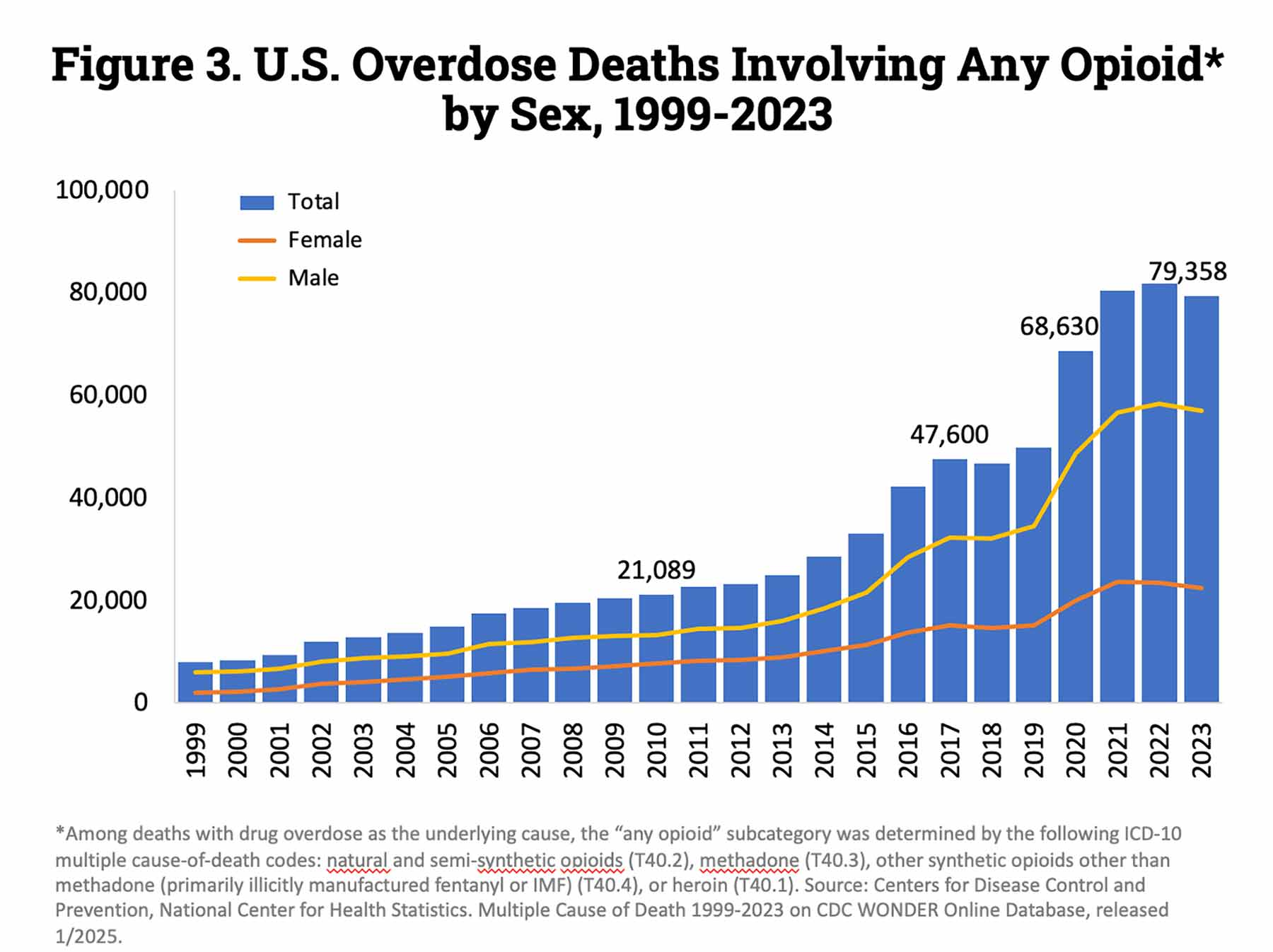
Opioids were involved in 81,806 overdose deaths in 2022, up from around 10,000 in 1999.

In 2018, Trump signed into law the First Step Act which, among other federal prison reforms, made the 2010 Fair Sentencing Act retroactive. A US Supreme Court decision in 2021 determined that retroactivity applied to cases where mandatory minimum penalties had been imposed.

In 2020, both the ACLU and The New York Times reported that Republicans and Democrats were in agreement that it was time to end the war on drugs. During his presidential campaign, President Joe Biden (2021–2025) stated that he would take the steps to alleviate the war on drugs and end the opioid epidemic.

On December 4, 2020, during the Trump administration, the House of Representatives passed the Marijuana Opportunity Reinvestment and Expungement Act (MORE Act), which would decriminalize cannabis at the federal level by removing it from the list of scheduled substances, expunge past convictions and arrests, and tax cannabis to "reinvest in communities targeted by the war on drugs". The MORE Act was received in the Senate in December 2020 where it remained. In April 2022, the act was again passed by the House, and awaits Senate action.

Over time, states in the US have approached drug liberalization at a varying pace. Initially, in the 1930s, the states were ahead of the federal government in prohibiting cannabis; in recent decades, the trend has reversed. Beginning with cannabis for medical use in California in 1996, states began to legalize cannabis. As of 2023, 38 states, four US territories, and the District of Columbia (DC) had legalized cannabis for medical use; for non-medical use, 24 of the states, three territories, and DC, had legalized it, and seven states decriminalized. Decriminalization in this context usually refers to first-time offenses and small quantities, such as, in the case of cannabis, under an ounce (28g). In November 2020, Oregon became the first state to decriminalize a number of drugs, including heroin, methamphetamine, PCP, LSD and oxycodone, shifting from a criminal approach to a public health approach; portions of that policy were reversed in April 2024.

In 2022, Biden signed into law the Medical Marijuana and Cannabidiol Research Expansion Act, to allow cannabis to be more easily researched for medical purposes. It is the first standalone cannabis reform bill enacted at the federal level. That October, Biden stated on social media, "We classify marijuana at the same level as heroin – and more serious than fentanyl. It makes no sense", and pledged to start a review by the Attorney General on how cannabis is classified. On October 6, he pardoned all those with federal convictions for simple cannabis possession (to a degree symbolic, as none of those affected were imprisoned at the time), and urged the states, where the large majority of convictions rest, to do the same. His action affected 6,500 people convicted from 1992 to 2021, and thousands convicted in the District of Columbia.

=== Focus on fentanyl ===
In 2023, the US State Department announced plans to launch a "global coalition to address synthetic drug threats", with more than 80 countries expected to join. That April, Anne Milgram, head of the DEA since 2021, stated to Congress that two Mexican drug cartels posed "the greatest criminal threat the United States has ever faced." Supporting a DEA budget request of $3.7 billion for 2024, Milgram cited fentanyl in the "most devastating drug crisis in our nation's history."

In October 2023, OFAC sanctioned a China-based network of fentanyl manufacturers and distributors. The drug is usually manufactured in China, then shipped to Mexico, where it is processed and packaged, which is then smuggled into the US by Mexican drug cartels.

In January 2024, the DEA confirmed that it was reviewing the classification of cannabis as a Schedule I narcotic. Days later, documents were released from the Department of Health and Human Services stating that cannabis has "a currently accepted medical use" in the US and a "potential for abuse less than the drugs or other substances in Schedules I and II." On 30 April, indicating a DEA decision, the Justice Department announced, "Today, the Attorney General circulated a proposal to reclassify marijuana from Schedule I to Schedule III. Once published by the Federal Register, it will initiate a formal rulemaking process as prescribed by Congress in the Controlled Substances Act." Schedule III drugs, considered to have moderate to low potential for dependence, include ketamine, anabolic steroids, testosterone, and Tylenol with codeine.

In the DEA's "National Drug Threat Assessment 2024", director Milgram outlined the "most dangerous and deadly crisis", involving synthetic drugs including fentanyl and methamphetamine. She singled out the Sinaloa and Jalisco cartels in Mexico, which manufacture the synthetics in Mexican labs supplied with precursor chemicals and machinery from China, sell through "vast distribution networks" in the US, and use Chinese money laundering operations to return the proceeds to Mexico. Milgram states, "As the lead law enforcement agency in the Administration's whole-of-government response to defeat the Cartels and combat the drug poisoning epidemic in our communities, DEA will continue to collaborate on strategic counterdrug initiatives with our law enforcement partners across the United States and the world."

== See also ==
- Drugs in the United States
- Foreign policy of the United States
- Drug prohibition
- Timeline of cannabis legalization in the United States
