= Opium Poppy Control Act of 1942 =

U.S. law

Opium Poppy Control Act
- Long title: An Act to discharge more effectively the obligations of the United States under certain treaties relating to the manufacture and distribution of narcotic, drugs, by providing for domestic control of the production and distribution of the opium poppy and its products, and for other purposes.
- Nicknames: Opium Poppy Control Act of 1942
- Enacted by: the 77th United States Congress
- Effective: February 9, 1943

Citations
- Public law: Pub. L. 77–797
- Statutes at Large: 56 Stat. 1045, Chap. 720

Codification
- Titles amended: 21 U.S.C.: Food and Drugs
- U.S.C. sections created: 21 U.S.C. ch. 6 § 168

Legislative history
- Introduced in the House as H.R. 7568 by Robert L. Doughton (D–NC) on October 21, 1942; Passed the House on October 21, 1942 (Passed); Passed the Senate on December 3, 1942 (Passed); Agreed to by the House on December 3, 1942 (Passed); Signed into law by President Franklin D. Roosevelt on December 11, 1942

The Opium Poppy Control Act of 1942, also known as the Poppy Control Act, was an act of the United States Congress signed into law by President Franklin D. Roosevelt on 11 December 1942.

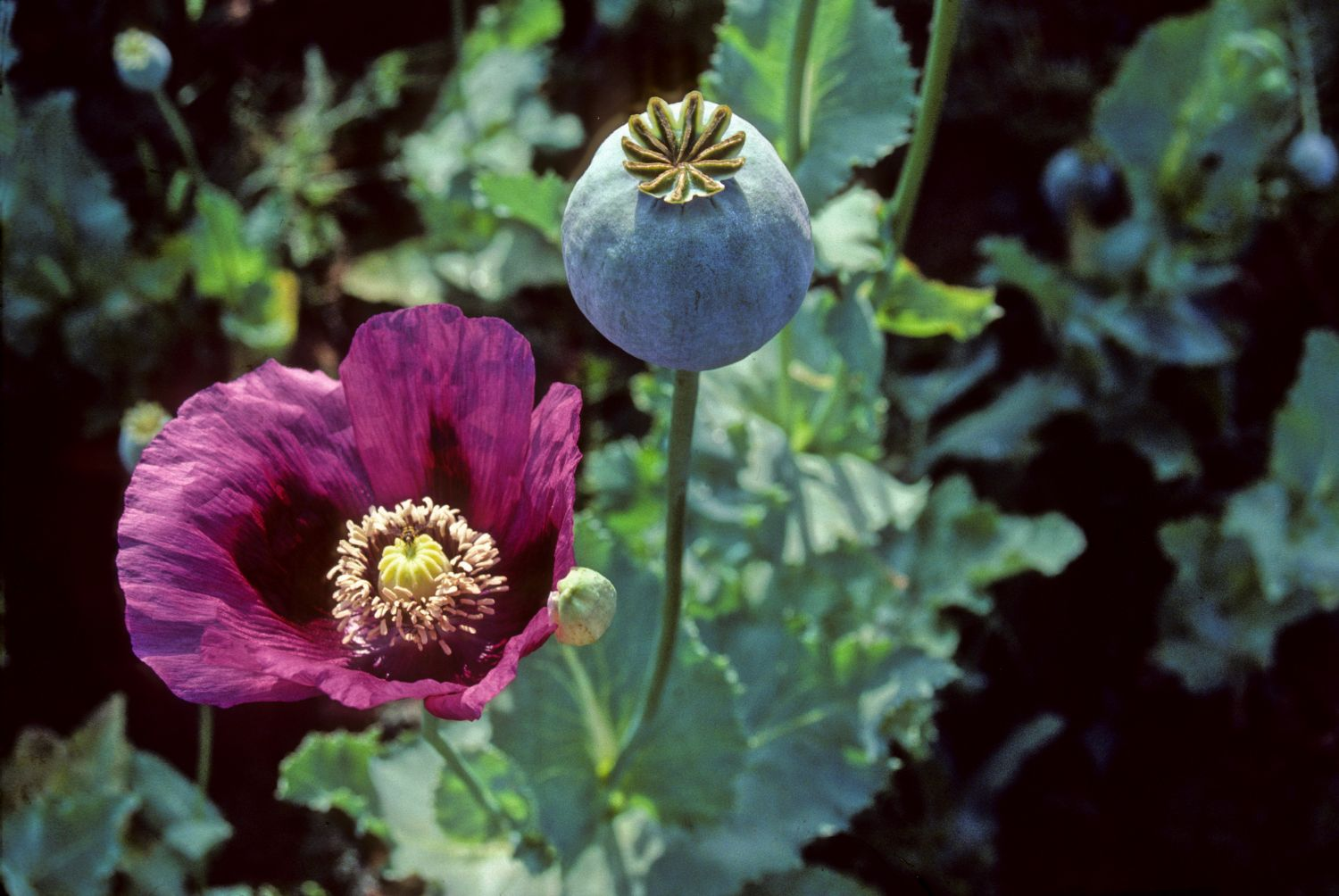
Opium poppies

The official law states that it is:

"AN ACT to discharge more effectively the obligations of the United States under certain treaties relating to the manufacture and distribution of narcotic drugs, by providing for domestic control of the production and distribution of the opium poppy and its products, and for other purposes banning all commercial poppy cultivation in most states."

Prior to the passage of this act, opium poppies were legally grown and cultivated across many regions of the United States. In response to questions from the press, the Federal Bureau of Narcotics issued a public statement regarding its interpretation of the law:

"The Opium Poppy Control Act, which was recently enacted, permits the licensing of opium poppy production only for the purpose of supplying the medical and scientific needs of the Nation for narcotic drugs. There is no immediate or presently prospective need for the growth of the opium poppy to supply medical and scientific needs, and, therefore, it is not now anticipated that any licenses will be issued."

== See also ==
- Anti-Heroin Act of 1924
- Convention for Limiting the Manufacture and Regulating the Distribution of Narcotic Drugs
- International Opium Convention of 1912
- Uniform State Narcotic Drug Act
