= Anti-Heroin Act of 1924 =

United States federal law

- Long title: An Act prohibiting the importation of crude opium for the purpose of manufacturing heroin.
- Nicknames: Opium Importation Prohibition Act of 1924
- Enacted by: the 68th United States Congress
- Effective: June 7, 1924

Citations
- Public law: Pub. L. 68–274
- Statutes at Large: 43 Stat. 657

Codification
- Titles amended: 21 U.S.C.: Food and Drugs
- U.S.C. sections amended: 21 U.S.C. ch. 6 § 173

Legislative history
- Introduced in the House as H.R. 7079 by Stephen G. Porter (R–PA) on April 17, 1924; Committee consideration by House Ways and Means; Passed the House on April 21, 1924 (Passed); Passed the Senate on May 27, 1924 (Passed); Signed into law by President Calvin Coolidge on June 7, 1924

The Anti-Heroin Act of 1924 is a United States federal law prohibiting the importation and possession of opium for the chemical synthesis of an addictive narcotic known as diamorphine or heroin. The Act of Congress amended the Smoking Opium Exclusion Act of 1909 which authorized the importation of the poppy plant for medicinal purposes utilizing an opium pipe or vaporization to consume the euphoric opiate.

The H.R. 7079 legislation was passed by the 68th United States Congressional session and enacted into law by the 30th President of the United States Calvin Coolidge on June 7, 1924.

== Repeal of Anti-Heroin Act ==
The 1924 United States public law was repealed by the enactment of Comprehensive Drug Abuse Prevention and Control Act on October 27, 1970.

== World Conference on Narcotic Education ==
The League of Nations and United States began participating in world narcotic conferences in the early 1900s. In 1924, United States House of Representatives passed a resolution for international conferences better known as the Second International Opium Convention.

In 1926, 69th United States Congress held hearings concerning a House resolution for the participation in the first narcotic education conference held in the United States. The Benjamin Franklin Hotel sponsored the narcotic education event in Philadelphia, Pennsylvania from July 5 to July 9, 1926.

In the early 1930s, the World Conference on Narcotic Education meetings were held at the Hotel McAlpin in New York City, New York. The 31st President of the United States Herbert Hoover issued public statements at the controlled substance education occasion stressing narcotic drugs as a "fearful menace" and a "menace to society".

In 1944, the 78th United States Congress passed a joint resolution supporting the purposes of the International Opium Conferences. The United States congressional motion reciprocated an urgency for the limitations on the production of opium to amounts required for strictly medicinal and scientific purposes.

== In popular culture ==
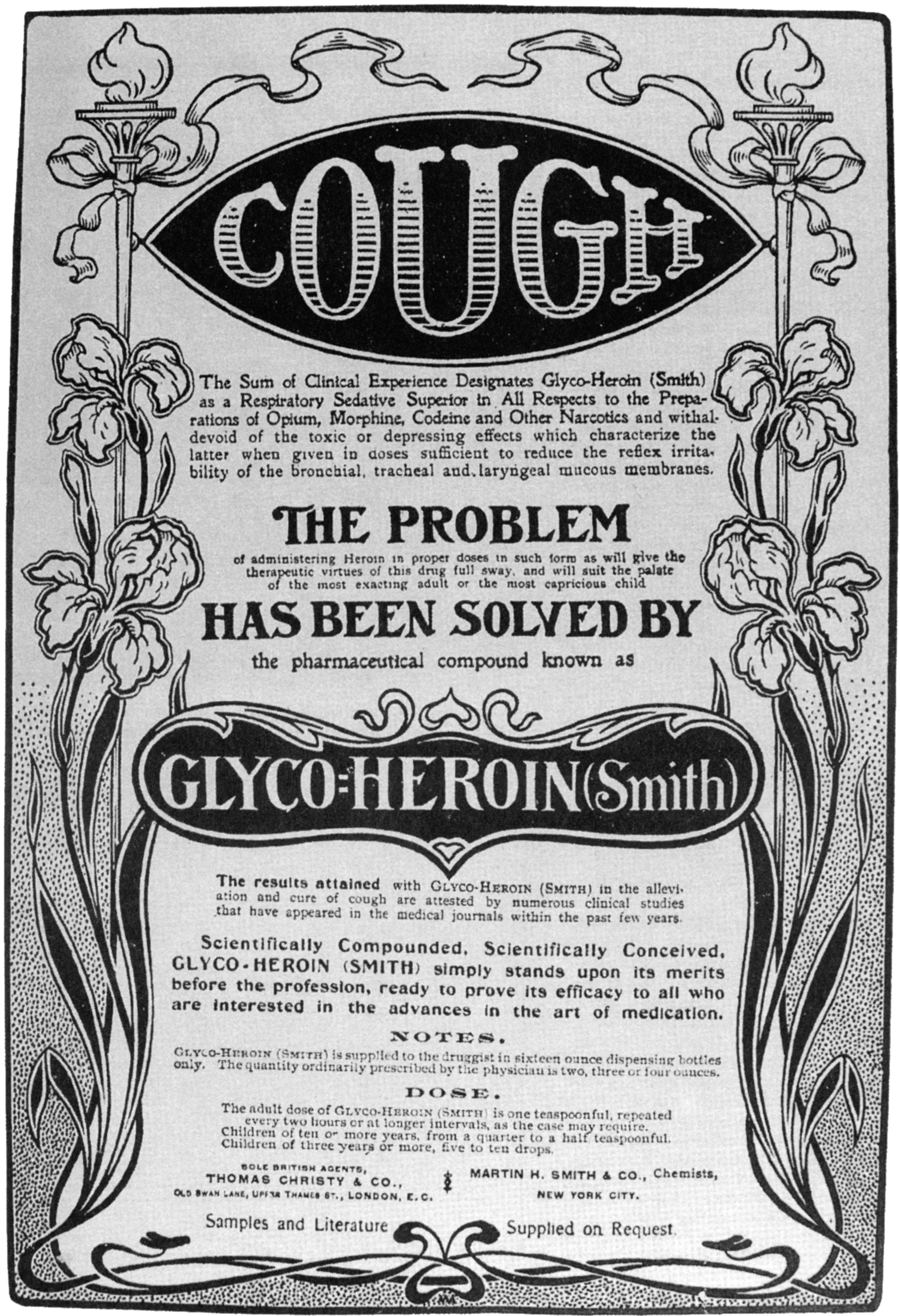
Advertisement for Heroin (Ca. 1900)

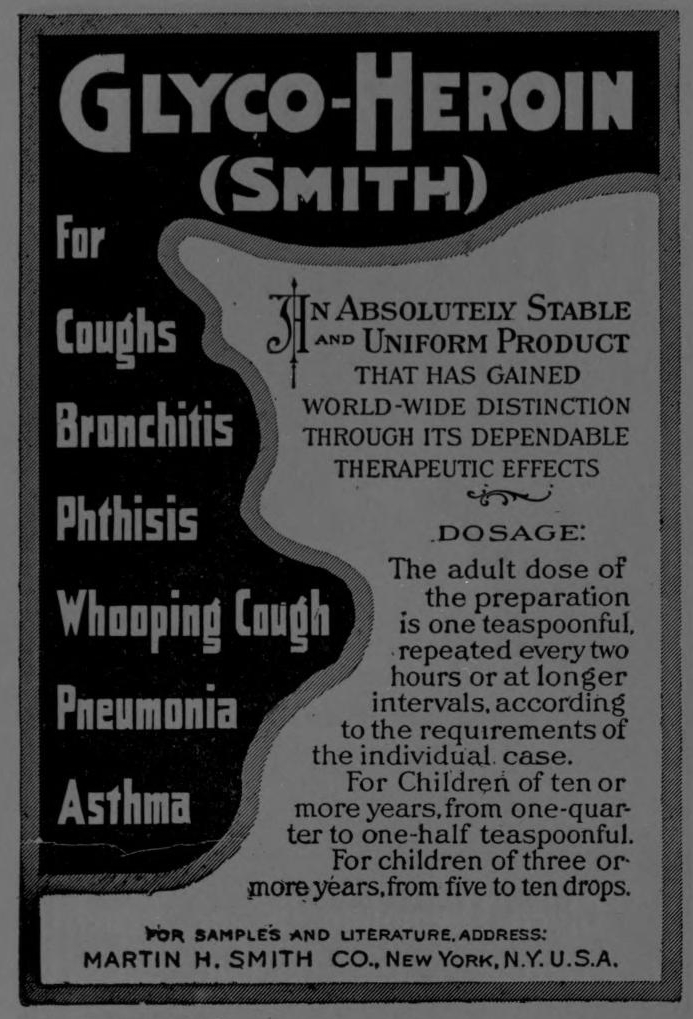
1914 Advertisement for a medication that includes heroin as an ingredient

American and international motion pictures were produced promoting awareness about the adverse health effects and social implications of euphoric psychoactive drug use and heroin.

To the Ends of the Earth (1948)	Lady Sings the Blues (1972)
The Man with the Golden Arm (1955)	Who'll Stop the Rain (1978)
Monkey on My Back (1957)	Christiane F. (1981)
The Narcotics Story (1958)	Rush (1991)
More (1969)	Gia (1998)
Trash (1970)	Maria Full of Grace (2004)
Jennifer on My Mind (1971)	American Gangster (2007)
The Panic in Needle Park (1971)	Puncture (2011)

== See also ==
☆ Charles Romley Alder Wright	☆ History of United States drug prohibition
☆ Clandestine chemistry	☆ Morpheus
☆ Convention for Narcotic Drugs (1931)	☆ Narcotic Drugs Import and Export Act
☆ Crude drug	☆ Narcotic Farms Act of 1929
☆ Cutting agent	☆ Needlestick injury
☆ Felix Hoffmann	☆ Opium den
☆ Harrison Narcotics Tax Act	☆ Poppy straw
☆ History of medicine in the United States	☆ St Mary's Hospital, London

Derivatives of Heroin

♦ Black tar heroin	♦ China white heroin
♦ Cheese	♦ Polish heroin

Narcotic Elixirs

• Dalby's Carminative	• Mrs. Winslow's Soothing Syrup
• Dover's powder	• Paregoric

Opium Poppy Cultivation & Production Sectors

▷ Golden Crescent	▷ Golden Triangle

== U.S. Political Observations of Narcotic Practices ==
- 68th U.S. Congress (June 3, 1924). "Use of Narcotics in the United States: Hearing before the Committee on printing, United States Senate, Sixty-eight Congress, first session, on S. Con. Res. 10". HathiTrust Digital Library. U.S. Government Printing Office. OCLC 14374502.
- Hoover, Herbert C. (December 2, 1930). "Executive Order 5502 - Rules Governing the Dispensation of Narcotic Drugs in the Virgin Islands" [Public Papers of the Presidents, Herbert Hoover 1930]. Internet Archive. Washington, D.C.: National Archives and Records Service. pp. 736–738.
