= Anti-Drug Abuse Act =

Anti-Drug Abuse Act may refer to:

- Anti-Drug Abuse Act of 1986
- Anti-Drug Abuse Act of 1988
