= Alfred Matthew Hubbard =

Early LSD proponent (1901–1982)

- Born: July 24, 1901
- Died: August 31, 1982 (aged 81)
- Other names: Al Hubbard; Captain Al Hubbard
- Known for: Work with LSD

Alfred Matthew Hubbard (July 24, 1901 – August 31, 1982), was an early proponent for the drug LSD during the 1950s. He is reputed to have been the "Johnny Appleseed of LSD" and the first person to emphasize LSD's potential as a visionary or transcendental drug.

== Career ==
In 1920, Hubbard was publicized in West Coast newspapers as having developed a free energy motor, though a Popular Science article published in 1928 referred to it as a hoax. In 1929, he received U.S. patent 1,723,422 for a radioactive "Internal Combustion Engine Spark Plug" device, which was manufactured sparingly by at least one U.S. company. It used an electrode doped with polonium 210, a radioactive isotope with a half-life of 138 days. The supposed "ionizing effect" of polonium 210 upon the combustion gases in the spark gap was purported to "improve engine efficiency". According to local historian Brad Holden, Hubbard was an early prototype for the "unconventional Seattle tech genius".

Motion was said to be among Hubbard's passions. His identity as "Captain" came from his Master of Sea Vessels certification and a stint in the US Merchant Marine.

According to some accounts, Hubbard worked at various times for the Canadian Special Services, the United States Justice Department, the United States Bureau of Alcohol, Tobacco, Firearms, and Explosives and the Office of Strategic Services, or OSS (predecessor of the US Central Intelligence Agency).

As Hubbard told the story to Willis Harman (and Harman told it to Todd Brendan Fahey, a reporter for High Times), he was hiking in Washington State when an angel appeared to him in a clearing. "She told Al that something tremendously important to the future of mankind would be coming soon, and he could play a role in it if he wanted to. But he hasn't the faintest clue what he was supposed to be looking for."

Having read in a scientific journal about the then-obscure drug LSD-25, Hubbard felt this was something that he was destined to learn more about and to be involved with. Hubbard found a researcher who was conducting reported experiments on LSD with rats. He was able to obtain some LSD for himself. He believed in its utility for opening the human mind to deeper, broader vistas.

The confident and connected Al Hubbard invited Dr. Humphry Osmond to join him for lunch at the Vancouver Yacht Club. Osmond and his colleagues were using the drug, as well as the similar substance, mescaline, in psychiatric research and treatment at Weyburn, Saskatchewan. Osmond later recalled that the Yacht Club "was a very dignified place, and I was rather awed by it. [Hubbard] was a powerfully-built man...with a broad face and a firm hand-grip. He was also very genial, an excellent host". "Captain Hubbard" was interested in acquiring some mescaline, which was then still legal, and Dr. Osmond supplied him with some.

By the time Timothy Leary and his colleagues were experimenting with psychedelic drugs in the psychology department of Harvard in the early 1960s, Hubbard had obtained a supply of Sandoz LSD. Hubbard went there to meet Leary and wanted to swap some LSD for some psilocybin, the psychoactive compound found in magic mushrooms, which was, at the time, identified and synthesized by Switzerland's Sandoz Laboratories.

The Central Intelligence Agency grew out of the post-World War II OSS, which was reputed to be one of Hubbard's employers. Under the auspices of MK-ULTRA, the CIA regularly dosed its agents and associates with powerful hallucinogens as a preemptive measure against what was alleged to be the Soviets' own chemical technology, sometimes with disastrous results. It is possible that Hubbard had some links with the CIA, but Humphry Osmond doubts that Hubbard would have been associated with a project like MK-ULTRA, "not particularly on humanitarian grounds, but on the grounds that it was bad technique."

"I was convinced that he was the man to bring LSD to planet Earth," remarked Myron Stolaroff, who was assistant to the president of long-range planning at electronics company Ampex Corporation when he met the Captain in the spring of 1956. Stolaroff learned of Hubbard through a mentor, philosopher Gerald Heard, a friend and spiritual mentor to Aldous Huxley.

Hubbard disagreed so strongly with Timothy Leary's antics concerning psychedelics that he is said to have contemplated shooting him.

According to Todd Brendan Fahey, Hubbard introduced more than 6,000 people to LSD, including scientists, politicians, intelligence officials, diplomats, and church figures.

== Works ==
- Hubbard, Al; et al. (1961). "The Use of LSD-25 in the Treatment of Alcoholism and Other Psychiatric Problems". Quarterly Journal of Studies on Alcohol. 22: 34–45. doi:10.15288/qjsa.1961.22.034. PMID 13764952.
