= Boggs Act of 1951 =

Congressional amendment

- Long title: An Act to amend the penalty provisions applicable to persons convicted of violating certain narcotic laws, and for other purposes.
- Nicknames: Marihuana and Narcotic Law Violators Act of 1951
- Enacted by: the 82nd United States Congress
- Effective: November 2, 1951

Citations
- Public law: Pub. L. 82–255
- Statutes at Large: 65 Stat. 767

Legislative history
- Introduced in the House as H.R. 3490 by Hale Boggs (D–LA) on June 21, 1951; Committee consideration by House Ways and Means, Senate Finance; Passed the House on July 16, 1951 (Passed); Passed the Senate on October 20, 1951 (Passed); Signed into law by President Harry S. Truman on November 2, 1951

The Boggs Act of 1951 amended the Narcotic Drugs Import and Export Act and set mandatory sentences for drug convictions. A first offense conviction for cannabis possession carried a minimum sentence of 2 to 10 years and a fine of up to $20,000.

== History ==
The act was sponsored by Hale Boggs, a Louisiana Democrat. On November 2, 1951, Harry S. Truman signed the act into law.

On January 4, 1952, under the provisions of the act, over 500 people were arrested.
