= Biomaterials Access Assurance Act of 1998 =

- Long title: An Act to establish rules governing product liability actions against raw materials and bulk component suppliers to medical device manufacturers, and for other purposes.
- Nicknames: Biomaterials Access Assurance Act of 1997
- Enacted by: the 105th United States Congress
- Effective: August 13, 1998

Citations
- Public law: 105–230
- Statutes at Large: 112 Stat. 1519

Codification
- Titles amended: 21 U.S.C.: Food and Drugs
- U.S.C. sections created: 21 U.S.C. ch. 21 § 1601 et seq.
- Agencies affected: Food and Drug Administration

Legislative history
- Introduced in the House as H.R. 872 by George Gekas (R–PA) on February 27, 1997; Committee consideration by House Judiciary, House Commerce; Passed the House on July 30, 1998 (Passed without objection); Passed the Senate on July 30, 1998 (Passed unanimous consent); Signed into law by President William J. Clinton on August 13, 1998

Biomaterials Access Assurance Act of 1998 is a United States federal statute establishing liability exemptions for biomaterial suppliers selling chemical components and raw materials utilized in implantable devices for human recipients. The United States federal legislation sets forth rules limiting litigation costs or unwarranted lawsuits for biomaterial suppliers excluded from the design, production, and testing of implantable devices demonstrated as effective and safe to include adequate product warnings.

The H.R. 872 bill was passed by the 105th United States Congressional session and enacted into law by the 42nd President of the United States Bill Clinton on August 13, 1998.

== Provision of the Act ==
The 1998 Act was compiled as six sections establishing liability rulings for biomaterial elements sold by domestic and international suppliers to healthcare manufacturers located in the continental United States.

21 U.S.C. § 1601 ~ U.S. Congressional findings
21 U.S.C. § 1602 ~ Definitions
21 U.S.C. § 1603 ~ General requirements, applicability, and preemption
21 U.S.C. § 1604 ~ Liability of biomaterials suppliers
21 U.S.C. § 1605 ~ Procedures for dismissal of civil actions against biomaterials suppliers
21 U.S.C. § 1606 ~ Subsequent impleader of dismissed biomaterials supplier

== Legislation of 1995 ==
On January 31, 1995, the 104th United States House of Representatives and United States Senate introduced the initial liability exemption legislation for suppliers dealing in biomaterial bulk products.

== See also ==
Biocompatibility
Biomaterial Surface Modifications
Biopolymer
Mechanical properties of biomaterials
Medical Device Regulation Act
Surface modification of biomaterials with proteins
