= Anti-Drug Abuse Act of 1988 =

US law

- Other short titles: Alcoholic Beverage Labeling Act of 1988; Anti-Drug Abuse Amendments Act of 1988; Asset Forfeiture Amendments Act of 1988; Bureau of Land Management Drug Enforcement Supplemental Authority Acct; Chemical Diversion and Trafficking Act of 1988; Child Protection and Obscenity Enforcement Act of 1988; Comprehensive Alcohol Abuse, Drug Abuse, and Mental Health Amendments Act of 1988; Drug-Free Public Housing Act of 1988; Drug-Free Workplace Act of 1988; Drunk Driving Prevention Act of 1988; Federal Aviation Administration Drug Enforcement Assistance Act of 1988; Insular Areas Drug Abuse Amendments of 1988; International Narcotics Control Act of 1988; Justice Department Organized Crime and Drug Enforcement Enhancement Act of 1988; Juvenile Justice and Delinquency Prevention Amendments of 1988; Minor and Technical Criminal Law Amendments Act of 1988; Money Laundering Prosecution Improvements Act of 1988; National Commission on Measured Responses to Achieve a Drug-Free America by 1995 Authorization Act; National Narcotics Leadership Act of 1988; Native Hawaiian Health Care Act of 1988; Public Housing Drug Elimination Act of 1988; Truck and Bus Safety and Regulatory Reform Act of 1988; Uniform Federal Crime Reporting Act of 1988; Urgent Supplemental Appropriations Act of 1989
- Long title: An Act to prevent the manufacturing, distribution, and use of illegal drugs, and for other purposes.
- Acronyms (colloquial): ADAA, ADTSA
- Nicknames: Alcohol and Drug Traffic Safety Act of 1988
- Enacted by: the 100th United States Congress
- Effective: November 18, 1988

Citations
- Public law: 100-690
- Statutes at Large: 102 Stat. 4181

Codification
- Acts amended: Anti-Drug Abuse Act of 1986
- Titles amended: 5 U.S.C.: Government Organization and Employees; 21 U.S.C.: Food and Drugs
- U.S.C. sections created: 21 U.S.C. ch. 20, subch. I § 1501 et seq.
- U.S.C. sections amended: 5 U.S.C. ch. 5, subch. I § 500 et seq.; 5 U.S.C. ch. 5, subch. II § 552; 21 U.S.C. ch. 13, subch. I § 801 et seq.; 21 U.S.C. ch. 13, subch. I § 841 et seq.; 21 U.S.C. ch. 13, subch. II § 951 et seq.

Legislative history
- Introduced in the House as H.R. 5210 by Tom Foley (D–WA) on August 11, 1988; Committee consideration by House Banking, Finance, and Urban Affairs, House Education and Labor, House Foreign Affairs, House Government Operations, House Energy and Commerce, House Interior and Insular Affairs, House Judiciary, House Merchant Marine and Fisheries, House Public Works and Transportation, House Ways and Means; Passed the House on September 22, 1988 (375-30); Passed the Senate on October 14, 1988 (87-3, in lieu of S. 2852) with amendment; House agreed to Senate amendment on October 22, 1988 (346-11) with further amendment; Senate agreed to House amendment on October 22, 1988 (Voice); Signed into law by President Ronald Reagan on November 18, 1988

The Anti-Drug Abuse Act of 1988 (Pub. L. 100–690, 102 Stat. 4181, enacted November 18, 1988, H.R. 5210) is a major law of the war on drugs passed by the U.S. Congress which did several significant things:

1. Created the policy goal of a drug-free America;
2. Established the Office of National Drug Control Policy; and
3. Restored the use of the death penalty by the federal government.

The change from the Act of 1986 to the Act of 1988 concerns the mandatory minimum penalties to drug trafficking conspiracies and attempts that previously were applicable only to substantive completed drug trafficking offenses. The Act amended 21 U.S.C. 844 to make crack cocaine the only drug with a mandatory minimum penalty for a first offense of simple possession. The Act made possession of more than five grams of a mixture or substance containing cocaine base punishable by at least five years in prison. The five year minimum penalty also applies to possession of more than three grams of cocaine base if the defendant has a prior conviction for crack cocaine possession, and to possession of more than one gram of crack if the defendant has two or more prior crack possession convictions.

The Anti-Drug Abuse Act of 1988 also offers several other amendments to the Act of 1986. First, the organization and coordination of Federal drug control efforts. Next, the reduction of drug demand through increased treatment and prevention efforts. Also, the reduction of illicit drug trafficking and production abroad. Lastly, sanctions designed to place added pressure on the drug user. The ADAA projected budget for the total federal drug control budget (if fully funded) was $6.5 billion for the 1989 fiscal year". The result of the Anti-Drug Abuse Act of 1988 was not foreseen. "After spending billions of dollars on law enforcement, doubling the number of arrests and incarcerations, and building prisons at a record pace, the system has failed to decrease the level of drug-related crime. Placing people in jail at increasing rates has had little long-term effect on the levels of crime".

The H.R. 5210 legislation was passed by the 100th U.S. Congressional session, and signed into law by president Ronald Reagan on November 18, 1988.

The media campaign mentioned in the act later became the National Youth Anti-Drug Media Campaign.

== Effects ==
The Anti-Drug Abuse Act of 1988 would bring coordination of the National Drug Policy, which would allow for a central point in government for drug enforcement and laws. The central point would require a national drug control strategy to be made to reduce the supply and demand of drugs in the United States. This went on to assist in having a controlled point in which a solution would be made to the ongoing war on drugs.

The Act would also make a point in giving access to treatment, and prevention education. The federal government would allow states to use block grants to create or improve rehab and treatment centers. Prevention education in schools of all levels would assist in showing the youth the risk and effects of drugs, and to offer those already affected by drugs additional support and access to treatment.

In the United States, those who are previous drug offenders, would be denied federal benefits, and government assistance. There were also stricter civil and criminal punishments for drug offenders, such as fines of almost $10,000. Past drug offenders would also entail random drug testing if they are on probation, to prohibit the use of drugs afterwards as well.

Internationally, the Act would give narcotics control aid to Mexico, and restrict countries that would not meet the new anti-narcotic standards.The Act would also allow the State Department to present rewards to information on crimes involving drugs outside of the United States. Law enforcement agencies would also receive a $500 million budget to help the fight in combating drugs.

There were additional provisions that would ban drug use workplace and public housing as well. Any tenant, or any party under control of the tenant who would participate in drug related activity in on near public housing would essentially lose their public housing. This allows drug users and criminals to be held accountable with their living quarters at complete risk. In the workplace, any employee under an individual or contractor whose services are valued over $25,000.00 would be suspended or terminated for the distribution, possession, or use of drugs in the workplace.

The law also addressed anabolic steroid and human growth hormone misuse. Section 2401 allows property forfeiture for Federal Food, Drug, and Cosmetic Act violations involving these substances punishable by over one year in prison. Section 2403 specifically targets anabolic steroids, with penalties up to three years imprisonment and/or fines for non-medical distribution or possession with intent to distribute, with enhanced penalties for distribution to minors. While the act targeted anabolic steroids, they were not classified as controlled substances at the federal level until the passage of the Anabolic Steroids Control Act of 1990.

== Committees and Hearings ==
Drug abuse was a common issue in the United States during this time. There were various committee hearings, but many had the same stance on the drug abuse issue. In the Committee Hearing held on June 16, 1988, the Drug Abuse —Prevention, Education, and Treatment hearing was one of many relating to the Act. During this hearing, Colleen Bangerter, the First Lady of the State of Utah, and Senator Paul Simon, who was on the Committee on Labor and Human Resources would show their support in reducing the demand for drugs in the United States. Whereas Dr. Lloyd Johnston, the Program Director at the Institute for Social Research at the University of Michigan would debate that the improvements in he fight against drug abuse had been coming from a changed view on drugs and the risks. David Weikart, President of High/Scope Education Research Foundation from Ypsilanti, Michigan would take a stand that drug prevention needs to be taught early on in schools to help this problem. He had conducted a researching showing that children in play based preschools are most likely to try hard drugs just by the age of fifteen.

== See also ==
- Anti-Drug Abuse Act of 1986
- Chemical Diversion and Trafficking Act
- Domestic policy of the Ronald Reagan administration
- Federal drug policy of the United States
