= Narcotic Farms Act of 1929 =

United States statute establishing a penal system for narcotic dependence

- Long title: An Act to establish two United States narcotic farms for the confinement and treatment of persons addicted to the use of habit-forming narcotic drugs who have been convicted of offenses against the United States, and for other purposes.
- Enacted by: the 70th United States Congress
- Effective: January 19, 1929

Citations
- Public law: Pub. L. 70–672
- Statutes at Large: 45 Stat. 1085

Codification
- Titles amended: 21 U.S.C.: Food and Drugs
- U.S.C. sections created: 21 U.S.C. ch. 8 §§ 221-237

Legislative history
- Introduced in the House as H.R. 13645 by Stephen G. Porter (R–PA) on May 14, 1928; Committee consideration by House Judiciary; Passed the House on May 21, 1928 (Passed); Passed the Senate on January 7, 1929 (Passed); Signed into law by President Calvin Coolidge on January 19, 1929

The Narcotic Farms Act of 1929 is a United States federal statute authorizing the establishment of two narcotic farms for the preventive custody and remedial care of individuals acquiring a sedative dependence for habit-forming narcotic drugs. The United States public law designated the construction of the narcotic dependent treatment facilities, which became known as the United States Public Health Service Hospitals, with the first infirmary opening in 1935 at Lexington, Kentucky, while the second infirmary opened in 1938 at Fort Worth, Texas.

The H.R. 13645 legislation was passed by the U.S. 70th Congressional session and enacted into law by President Calvin Coolidge on January 19, 1929.

== Repeal of Narcotic Farms Act of 1929 ==
The 1929 United States public law was repealed by the enactment of the Public Health Service Act on July 1, 1944.

== Abolishment of narcotic farms ==
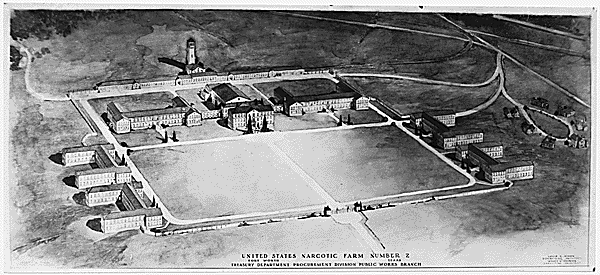
The facility in Texas

By 1975, the two narcotic farm establishments had been abrogated as a national anti-narcotic treatment program in the rural United States. The narcotic farm concept was abandoned due to advancement in medication treatment along with United States controlled substance policies regarding narcotic sedative dependence.

Anti-narcotic treatment

- Drug detoxification
- Methadone
- Methadone maintenance
- Naloxone (1961)
- Naltrexone (1967)

Anti-narcotic legislative policies

- Narcotic Addict Rehabilitation Act of 1966
- Alcoholic and Narcotic Addict Rehabilitation Amendments of 1968
- Community Mental Health Centers Amendments of 1970
- Narcotic Addict Treatment Act of 1974

== See also ==
- Anti-Heroin Act of 1924
- Community Mental Health Act
- Deinstitutionalisation
- Federal Bureau of Narcotics
- Federal Correctional Institution, Fort Worth
- Harry J. Anslinger
- Hugh S. Cumming
- Narcotic Drugs Import and Export Act
- Narcotics Manufacturing Act of 1960

== United States Narcotic Farm Pictorial Biography ==
- "Narcotic Farm - Fort Worth, Texas". University of Texas Arlington Libraries. University of Texas at Arlington.
- "United States Public Health Service Hospital, United States Narcotic Farm, Fort Worth, Texas". University of Texas Arlington Libraries. University of Texas at Arlington.
- "Narcotic Farm Federal Groundbreaking Exercises in Fort Worth". University of Texas Arlington Libraries. University of Texas at Arlington.
