= 1946 Lake Success Protocol =

1946 treaty on narcotic drug control

Protocol Amending the Agreements, Conventions and Protocols on Narcotic Drugs concluded at The Hague on 23 January 1912, at Geneva on 11 February 1925 and 19 February 1925, and 13 July 1931, at Bangkok on 27 November 1931 and at Geneva on 26 June 1936
- Signed: 11 December 1946
- Location: Lake Success
- Effective: 11 December 1946
- Condition: For each Party, the treaty entered into force immediately upon their (a) signature without reservation as to approval, (b) signature subject to approval followed by acceptance or (c) acceptance.
- Parties: 62

The Protocol Amending the Agreements, Conventions and Protocols on Narcotic Drugs concluded at The Hague on 23 January 1912, at Geneva on 11 February 1925 and 19 February 1925, and 13 July 1931, at Bangkok on 27 November 1931 and at Geneva on 26 June 1936 was a treaty, signed on 11 December 1946 at Lake Success, that shifted the drug control functions previously assigned to the League of Nations to the United Nations. As the Protocol's official title says, it modifies the provisions of the:

- 1912 First International Opium Convention
- 1925 Second International Opium Convention
- 1931 Convention for Limiting the Manufacture and Regulating the Distribution of Narcotic Drugs, and the
- 1936 Convention for the Suppression of the Illicit Traffic in Dangerous Drugs.

Under this Protocol, the Commission on Narcotic Drugs, appointed by the UN Economic and Social Council, took over drug policy making from the League of Nations' Advisory Committee on Traffic in Opium and Other Dangerous Drugs. In an important precedent, the Supervisory Body that was created to administer the estimate system (which required nations to keep within their predetermined estimates of necessary narcotics production, imports, exports, etc.) was appointed by:

- The World Health Organization (two members)
- The Commission on Narcotic Drugs (one member)
- The Permanent Central Board (one member).

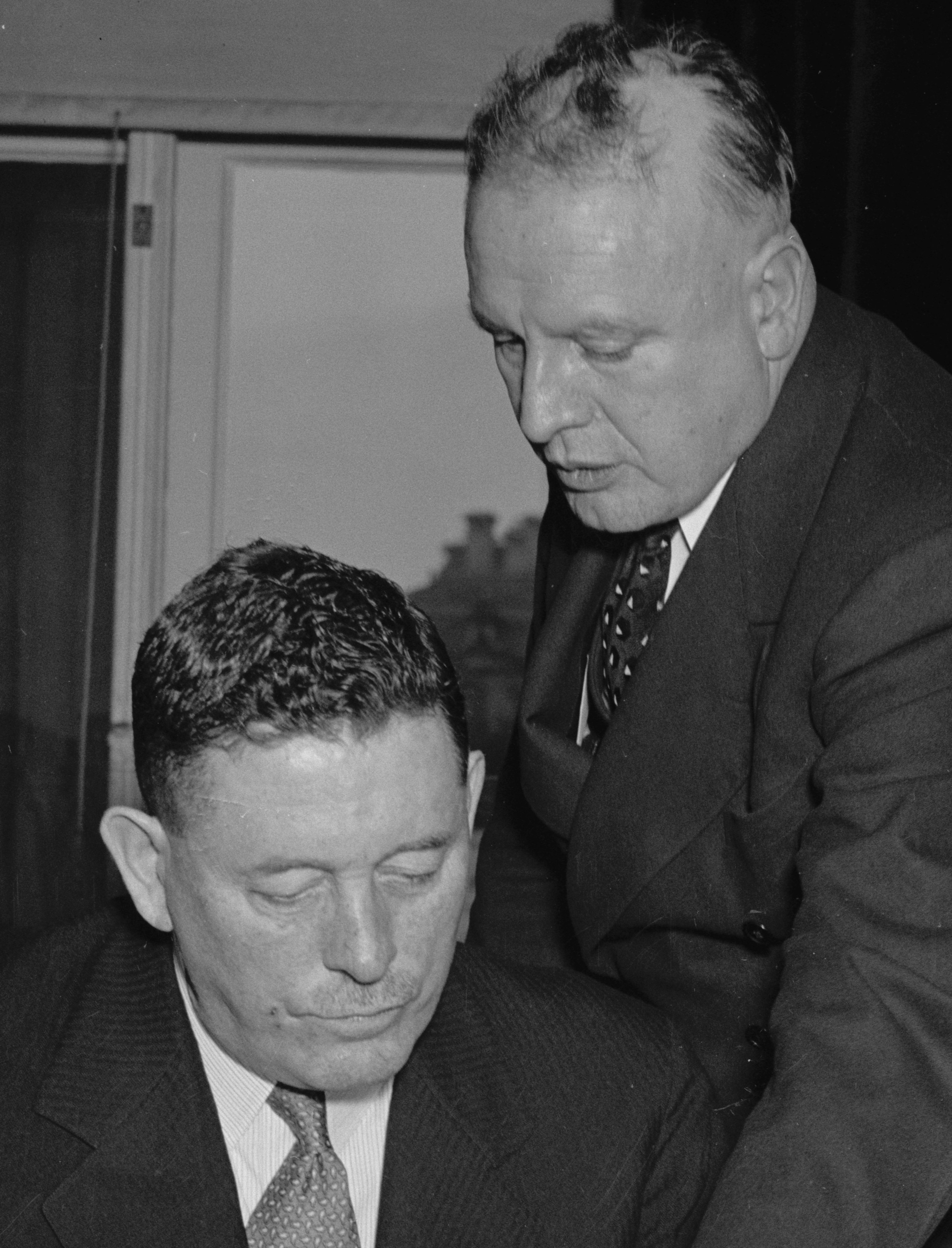
Charles Henry Ludovic Sharman (left) and Harry J. Anslinger (right)

The Supervisory Body's successor, the International Narcotics Control Board, also had 3 of its 13 members nominated by the World Health Organization, with the rest nominated by UN members, with nominations subject to approval by the UN Economic and Social Council. No doubt in both cases, lobbying by the pharmaceutical industries influenced the inclusion of a requirement to place some scientific and medical experts on the board. However, the influence of Harry J. Anslinger and his Canadian counterpart Charles Henry Ludovic Sharman, both narcotics control officials, could be seen in the decision to allow the Commission to select some members (thus allowing law enforcement officials to be appointed to the Supervisory Body).

In accordance with the provisions of the drug control treaties, the revisions instituted by the Protocol did not require ratification to enter into force. For each party, the treaty entered into force immediately upon their (a) signature without reservation as to approval, (b) signature subject to approval followed by acceptance or (c) acceptance. Since there were far fewer independent nations in the 1940s than there are today, the Protocol's initial 40 parties – including populous empires and unions such as the United Kingdom and Soviet Union – encompassed the vast majority of the world's population. As of 2013, the Protocol has 62 state parties; of the ratifying states, the Netherlands has denounced the treaty.

The Protocol was superseded by the Single Convention on Narcotic Drugs, except as it affected the 1936 Convention for the Suppression of the Illicit Traffic in Dangerous Drugs. However, the Protocol's influence can be plainly seen in the power structure established by the Single Convention, which remains in force.
