= Tea Importation Act of 1897 =

US law

- Long title: An Act to prevent the importation of impure and unwholesome tea.
- Enacted by: the 54th United States Congress
- Effective: May 1, 1897

Citations
- Public law: Pub. L. 54–358
- Statutes at Large: 29 Stat. 604

Codification
- Titles amended: 21 U.S.C.: Food and Drugs
- U.S.C. sections created: 21 U.S.C. ch. 2 § 41 et seq.

Legislative history
- Introduced in the Senate as S. 3725 by David B. Hill (D–NY); Committee consideration by Senate Commerce, House Ways and Means; Signed into law by President Grover Cleveland on March 2, 1897

Tea Importation Act of 1897 was a United States public law forbidding the import of tea into the United States that failed to meet federally established standards of purity, quality, and fitness for consumption. The Act of Congress established a system of standardized tea samples and federal examinations to determine whether imported tea was suitable for consumption.

The 1897 statute superseded the Spurious Tea Importation Act of 1883.

The act was on the books for 99 years before its repeal in 1996. After repeal, the Food and Drug Administration still regulates the quality of tea imported to the United States under the Federal Food, Drug, and Cosmetic Act of 1938.

== Provisions of the Act ==
The United States statute had twelve sections and authorized the United States Secretary of the Treasury to implement the law.

As codified just before its repeal, the Act instructed the Secretary of Health and Human Services each year "to appoint a board, to consist of seven members, each of whom shall be an expert in teas, and who shall prepare and submit to him standard samples of tea." In accordance with the board of experts' recommendations, the Secretary was instructed to "fix and establish uniform standards of purity, quality, and fitness for consumption of all kinds of teas imported unto the United States" and to deposit samples of these standards in the customhouses of various ports of entry. Tea importers were required to submit samples of their product for comparison with the standard samples kept at the customhouses. The imported samples were then tested "by a duly qualified examiner," who would test "the purity, quality, and fitness for consumption of the... [imported tea samples] according to the usages and customs of the tea trade, including the testing of an infusion of the same in boiling water and, if necessary, chemical analysis."

== Administration and jurisdiction ==
The Board of Tea Appeals was a United States federal agency responsible for adjudicating appeals by tea importers whose products had been rejected by federal tea examiners. Under the original act, appeals were referred to a board of three United States general appraisers appointed by the Secretary of the Treasury.

In 1920, the Board of General Appraisers was replaced by a United States Board of Tea Appeals, consisting of three employees from the Department of Agriculture, appointed by the Secretary of Agriculture. The transfer of tea-importation responsibilities to the Department of Agriculture was provided for under the appropriations for its Bureau of Chemistry.

In 1940, the Food and Drug Administration, formerly part of the Department of Agriculture's Bureau of Chemistry, was transferred to the Federal Security Agency (FSA).

During fiscal year 1940-1941, Congress failed to appropriate funds for enforcement of the act. To maintain the inspection program, the tea industry offered to pay the cost of enforcement, at 3 and 1/2 cents per 100 pounds of imported tea.

In 1953, the Department of Health, Education and Welfare (later renamed the Department of Health and Human Services) was created, and all functions of the former FSA were transferred to it, including the act's enforcement.

== Amendment and Repeal of 1897 Act ==
The Tea Importation Act of 1908 amended the 1897 public law permitting the import of tea siftings, tea sweepings, or tea waste for the extraction of caffeine or theine, and other chemical products. The 1897 Act was repealed with the United States 104th Congressional session enactment of the Federal Tea Tasters Repeal Act of 1996.

== Sections of the act ==
The twelve sections of the original act:

21 U.S.C. § 1 ~ Prohibit the unlawful importation of substandard tea
21 U.S.C. § 2 ~ Establishment of a board of experts on tea
21 U.S.C. § 3 ~ Establishment of tea purity standards
21 U.S.C. § 4 ~ Bonds of exporters, examination of imported tea, and importation at ports without examiners
21 U.S.C. § 5 ~ Delivery permits, reexamination, retention of substandard tea
21 U.S.C. § 6 ~ Referral of disputes to Board of Tea Appeals to permit delivery, order destruction, or exportation of substandard tea
21 U.S.C. § 7 ~ Examiners and examination according to usage of trade
21 U.S.C. § 8 ~ Reexaminations including findings by examiner and assistance of experts
21 U.S.C. § 9 ~ Reimporting rejected tea and forfeitures for violation of provisions
21 U.S.C. § 10 ~ Issuance of regulations
21 U.S.C. § 11 ~ Tea on shipboard subject to former 1883 law
21 U.S.C. § 12 ~ Repeal of 1883 Act

== See also ==
- Great Tea Race of 1866
- List of tea diseases
- Tea blending and additives
- Tea leaf grading
- Tea tasting
