= Myron Stolaroff =

American author and researcher

- Stolaroff in 2006
- Born: August 20, 1920; Roswell, New Mexico
- Died: January 6, 2013 (aged 92); Lone Pine, California
- Known for: Work with psychedelic drugs

Myron J. Stolaroff (August 20, 1920 – January 6, 2013) was an author and researcher who is best known for his studies involving psychedelic psychotherapy. He also conducted clinical studies that attempted to measure the effects of LSD, mescaline, and other drugs on creativity.

== Biography ==
Stolaroff was born in Roswell, New Mexico in 1920. In 1941, he received a master's degree in electrical engineering from Stanford University. From 1942 through 1945, he held the title of Civilian Engineer at the Navy Department, Bureau of Ships. For the next fifteen years he worked for the recording equipment manufacturer Ampex, first as a senior design engineer, later as Director of Instrumentation Marketing, ultimately becoming responsible for long-range planning as Assistant to the President.

Along with fellow Ampex engineer, Harold Lindsey, Stolaroff co-designed the Ampex Model 200A reel-to-reel tape recorder, which was based on a German Magnetophon modified by the audio engineer Jack Mullin. With Bing Crosby arranging financial support for start-up manufacturing, the Ampex 200A went into production. Crosby gifted one of the first units to Les Paul, inventor of the solid-body electric guitar, who went on to produce numerous innovative recordings. Within three years most major recording studios had purchased an Ampex 200A. Songs such as Nat King Cole performing "Unforgettable" (1952 Capitol Records), Frank Sinatra performing "Young at Heart" (1953 Capitol Records), and Bill Haley performing "(We're Gonna) Rock Around the Clock" (1954 Decca Records), were recorded on an Ampex 200A. In 2008, Stolaroff was among the folks representing Ampex at the 50th Annual Grammy Awards Ceremony to accept the company's first Grammy Award for Technical Achievement, in honor of their contribution sixty years earlier of the Ampex 200A, which "revolutionized the radio and recording industries".

Stolaroff was interested in personal transformation through psychedelics, and in the Spring of 1956 went to Vancouver to meet with early LSD proponent Alfred Mathew Hubbard. After this first LSD trip he tried to introduce the drug to Ampex engineers to enhance their creativity, but could not get higher management on board with the idea. After quitting from Ampex in 1961, Stolaroff established the International Foundation for Advanced Study in Menlo Park, a non-profit medical research organization. IFAS was both an experimental learning institution, and Stolaroff worked there with Willis Harman, Robert McKim, James Fadiman, and Robert Mogar. He served as its president until 1970. During this time, he was the executive administrator for a group conducting clinical studies with LSD and mescaline; the IFAS administered psychedelics to about 350 participants. Their research resulted in six published papers on psychedelic therapy with Stolaroff as co-author on most of the articles. The Foundation's clinical studies came to an end in 1965 when the Food and Drug Administration (FDA) revoked research permits for psychedelics.

Stolaroff privately continued psychedelic research using unscheduled compounds from 1970 to 1986, until the Controlled Substance Analogue Enforcement Act of 1986 was passed and halted his research again.

Stolaroff also worked as a Consulting Engineer and as a General Manager of Multi-Media Productions, a manufacturer of social studies and sound filmstrips for public schools. He retired in 1979.

He published professional papers in the Journal of Nervous and Mental Disease, Gnosis, the Yearbook for Ethnomedicine and the Study of Consciousness, and several other journals. Stolaroff served on the board of directors of the Albert Hofmann Foundation. He was also a consultant to the Heffter Research Institute and was on the Board of Advisors for the Center for Cognitive Liberty and Ethics.

Stolaroff died on January 6, 2013.

== Bibliography ==
=== Books ===
- The Secret Chief: Conversations With a Pioneer of the Underground Psychedelic Therapy Movement, full text (1997)
- Thanatos To Eros, 35 Years of Psychedelic Exploration, full text (1994)

=== Papers ===
- Stolaroff, MJ (1999). "Are Psychedelics Useful in the Practice of Buddhism". Journal of Humanistic Psychology. 39 (1): 60–80. doi:10.1177/0022167899391009.
- Stolaroff, MJ. Wells, CW. (1993). "Preliminary Results with New Psychoactive Agents 2C-T-2 AND 2C-T-7". Yearbook for Ethnomedicine. full text PDF
- Harman, WW; McKim, RH; Mogar, RE; Fadiman, J; Stolaroff, MJ (August 1966). "Psychedelic agents in creative problem-solving: a pilot study". Psychological Reports. 19 (1): 211–27. doi:10.2466/pr0.1966.19.1.211. PMID 5942087.
- Savage, C. Stolaroff; MJ (1965). "Clarifying the Confusion Regarding LSD-25". The Journal of Nervous and Mental Disease. 140 (3): 218–221. doi:10.1097/00005053-196503000-00007.
- Savage, W. Fadiman; Stolaroff, C.; Harman, M. (1963). "The Psychedelic Experience". Journal of Neuropsychiatry. 15: 4–5. PMID 14089792.
- Sherwood, JN; Stolaroff, MJ; Harman, WW (1962). "The psychedelic experience--a new concept in psychotherapy". Journal of Neuropsychiatry. 4: 69–80. PMID 13977209.

=== Film ===
- Hofmann's Potion: The Early Years of LSD – story consultant
