= Protocol Bringing under International Control Drugs outside the Scope of the Convention of 13 July 1931 for Limiting the Manufacture and Regulating the Distribution of Narcotic Drugs =

1948 drug control treaty

Protocol bringing under International Control Drugs Outside of the Scope of the 1931 Convention for Limiting the Manufacture and Regulating the Distribution of Narcotic Drugs
- Signed: November 19, 1948
- Location: Paris
- Effective: December 1, 1949
- Signatories: 39
- Parties: 90

The Protocol bringing under International Control Drugs Outside of the Scope of the 1931 Convention for Limiting the Manufacture and Regulating the Distribution of Narcotic Drugs, signed in 1948, was a drug control treaty designed to eliminate some of the loopholes associate with its predecessor treaty, the 1931 Convention for Limiting the Manufacture and Regulating the Distribution of Narcotic Drugs. It is perhaps most noteworthy as the first drug control treaty to implement the similarity concept; that is, its provisions applied to all drugs with similar harmful effects and abuse liabilities as the drugs specified in article I, paragraph 2 of the 1931 treaty. The similarity concept was also included in the 1961 Single Convention on Narcotic Drugs and the 1971 Convention on Psychotropic Substances.

The impetus for the treaty was the popularity of new, uncontrolled opiate derivatives that were outside the scope of the Permanent Central Board's restrictions. In particular, manufacturers were switching from morphine to pethidine, methadone, and other designer drugs to evade the international restrictions. The similarity concept was specifically designed to combat these tactics.

In addition, every Party to the Protocol was committed to inform the UN Secretary-General of any drug used or capable of being used for medical or scientific purposes (and not falling within the scope of the 1931 Convention) which that party considered capable of abuse and of producing harmful effects. The Protocol also authorized the Commission on Narcotic Drugs to place such a drug under provisional control. The provisional control measures might be altered in the light of the conclusions and decisions of the World Health Organization (and subsequently in the light of experience).

The Protocol was superseded by the 1961 Single Convention on Narcotic Drugs.
