= Anti-Drug Abuse Act of 1986 =

Law pertaining to the war on drugs passed by the U.S. Congress

- Other short titles: Alcohol and Drug Abuse Amendments of 1986; Controlled Substance Analogue Enforcement Act of 1986; Federal Analog Act
- Long title: An Act to strengthen Federal efforts to encourage foreign cooperation in eradicating illicit drug crops and in halting international drug traffic, to improve enforcement of Federal drug laws and enhance interdiction of illicit drug shipments, to provide strong Federal leadership in establishing effective drug abuse prevention and education programs, to expand Federal support for drug abuse treatment and rehabilitation efforts, and for other purposes.
- Enacted by: the 99th United States Congress
- Effective: October 27, 1986

Citations
- Public law: 99-570
- Statutes at Large: 100 Stat. 3207

Codification
- Acts amended: Freedom of Information Act
- Titles amended: 21 U.S.C.: Food and Drugs
- U.S.C. sections amended: 21 U.S.C. ch. 13, subch. I § 801 et seq.; 21 U.S.C. ch. 13, subch. I § 841 et seq.; 21 U.S.C. ch. 13, subch. II § 951 et seq.

Legislative history
- Introduced in the House as H.R. 5484 by James C. Wright Jr. (D–TX) on September 8, 1986; Committee consideration by House Armed Services, House Banking, Finance, and Urban Affairs, House Education and Labor, House Foreign Affairs, House Government Operations, House Energy and Commerce, House Interior and Insular Affairs, House Judiciary, House Merchant Marine and Fisheries, House Post Office and Civil Service, House Public Works and Transportation, House Ways and Means; Passed the House on September 11, 1986 (392-16); Passed the Senate on September 30, 1986 (97-2, in lieu of S. 2878) with amendment; House agreed to Senate amendment on October 17, 1986 (unanimous consent) with further amendment; Senate agreed to House amendment on October 17, 1986 (voice vote); Signed into law by President Ronald Reagan on October 27, 1986

Major amendments
- Anti-Drug Abuse Act of 1988

The Anti-Drug Abuse Act of 1986, also known as the Len Bias Law, was a law pertaining to the war on drugs passed by the U.S. Congress and signed into law by U.S. President Ronald Reagan. It changed the system of federal supervised release from a rehabilitative system into a punitive system. The 1986 Act also prohibited controlled substance analogs. The bill enacted new mandatory minimum sentences for drugs, including marijuana.

== History ==
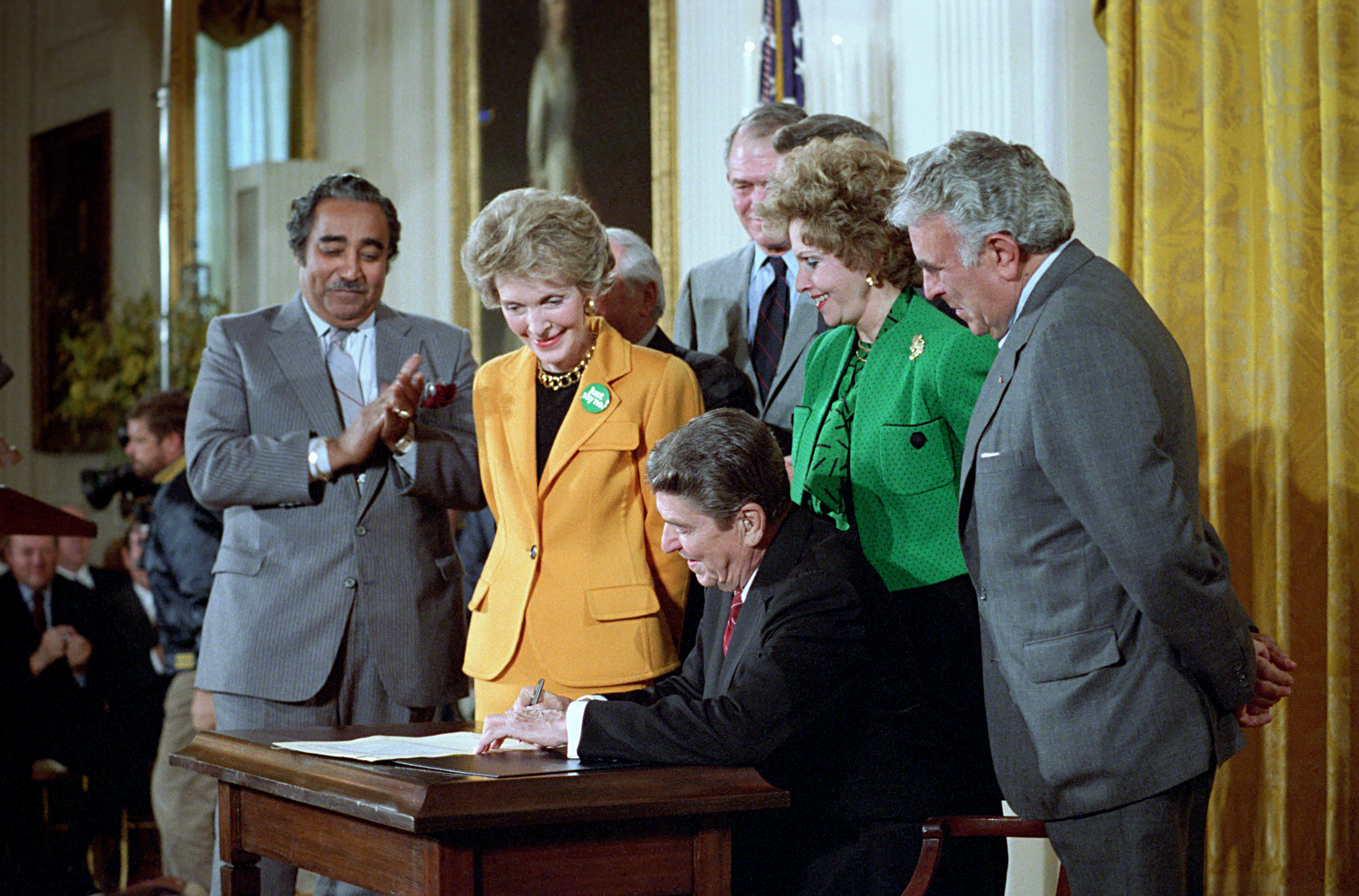
President Ronald Reagan signs the Anti Drug Abuse Act of 1986 in the East Room. Charlie Rangel (far left) and Nancy Reagan look on.

The emergence of crack cocaine, along with the cocaine-related deaths of Len Bias and Don Rogers on June 19 and June 27, 1986, respectively, prompted then-Speaker of the House of Representatives Tip O'Neill to mobilize the House Democratic leadership to draft an omnibus anti-drug bill. This became the Anti-Drug Abuse Act of 1986.

Congressional attention and extensive media coverage contributed to a moral panic surrounding cocaine use — which had earlier been regarded as relatively benign — and built momentum for the legislation. In September and October 1986, the House, with a Democratic majority, and the Senate, with a Republican majority, each advanced proposals for stricter anti-drug legislation ahead of the midterm elections. The bill was signed into law by Reagan on October 27.

== Contents ==
=== Money Laundering Control Act ===
The Money Laundering Control Act of 1986 was enacted as Title I of the Anti-Drug Abuse Act. This title criminalized money laundering for the first time in the United States. It also amended the Bank Secrecy Act, the Change in Bank Control Act, and the Right to Financial Privacy Act.

=== Drug crimes ===
Along with the Comprehensive Crime Control Act of 1984, the act substantially increased the number of drug offenses with mandatory minimum sentences.

This act mandated a minimum sentence of 5 years without parole for possession of 5 grams of crack cocaine, while it mandated the same for possession of 500 grams of powder cocaine. This 100:1 disparity was reduced to 18:1, when crack was increased to 28 grams (1 ounce) by the Fair Sentencing Act of 2010.

The law also banned the operation of venues intended for use of illegal drugs, a provision known as the "Crackhouse Law". It was amended in the RAVE Act of 2003.

=== Spending ===
The act authorized billions of dollars in spending, although substantially less was actually appropriated. Some of this was used to increase the substance abuse treatment federal block grant program, although treatment providers were disappointed at the reduced appropriations following politicians' earlier promises and authorization.

Other programs funded by the act included drug counseling and education programs, AIDS research, and international cooperation to limit drug production.

The Act also included the Drug Free Schools and Communities Act, which required colleges to establish drug abuse education and prevention programs.

== Impact ==
The law led to an increase in average time imprisoned for drug crimes from 22 months to 33 months.

== Racial effect ==
The Anti-Drug Abuse Act created a significant disparity in the sentences imposed for crimes involving powder cocaine versus crack cocaine, with the ratio of 100 to 1. For example, a drug crime involving 5 grams of crack cocaine resulted in a mandatory minimum sentence of 5 years in federal prison, while crimes involving 500 grams of powder cocaine received the same sentence. After the Anti-Drug Abuse Act, the number of black people sent to federal prison skyrocketed from approximately 50 in 100,000 adults to approximately 250 in 100,000 adults.

The Act also led to an increased disparity in prison sentencing lengths between races. Prior to the enactment of the Anti-Drug Abuse Act, black people received sentences for drug-related crimes which were 11% longer than sentences received by whites who committed the same offense. In the years that followed, this disparity increased to 49%. This led to racial and class imbalance, with minorities facing harsher punishments for the use and sale of the same drug as their affluent, white counterparts.

== See also ==
- Anti-Drug Abuse Act of 1988
