= Narcotic Drugs Import and Export Act =

1922 act of the United States Congress

- Other short titles: Jones-Miller Act
- Long title: An Act to amend the Act entitled "An Act to prohibit the importation and use of opium for other than medicinal purposes," approved February 9, 1909, as amended.
- Acronyms (colloquial): NDIEA
- Nicknames: Narcotic Drugs Import and Export Act Amendment
- Enacted by: the 67th United States Congress
- Effective: May 26, 1922

Citations
- Public law: Pub. L. 67–227
- Statutes at Large: 42 Stat. 596

Codification
- Acts amended: Smoking Opium Exclusion Act of 1909
- Titles amended: 21 U.S.C.: Food and Drugs
- U.S.C. sections created: 21 U.S.C. ch. 6 § 171 et seq.

Legislative history
- Introduced in the House as H.R. 2193 by Wesley Livsey Jones (R–WA) on March 27, 1922; Committee consideration by House Ways and Means, Senate Finance; Passed the House on May 4, 1922 (passed); Passed the Senate on May 12, 1922 (passed) with amendment; House agreed to Senate amendment on May 16, 1922 (agreed); Signed into law by President Warren G. Harding on May 26, 1922

The Narcotic Drugs Import and Export Act was a 1922 act of the 67th United States Congress. Sponsored by Sen. Wesley L. Jones (R) of Washington and Rep. John F. Miller (R) of Washington. It is also often referred to as the Jones-Miller Act.

== Federal Narcotics Control Board ==
The Act also led to the establishing of the Federal Narcotics Control Board (FNCB) to tightly oversee the import and export primarily of opiates, but also other psychoactive drugs like coca. The control board were created to better control what America was exporting from its territories to others as well as what was being brought in, to ban all recreational consumption and to control the quality of what was being used for medical purposes.

== Background ==
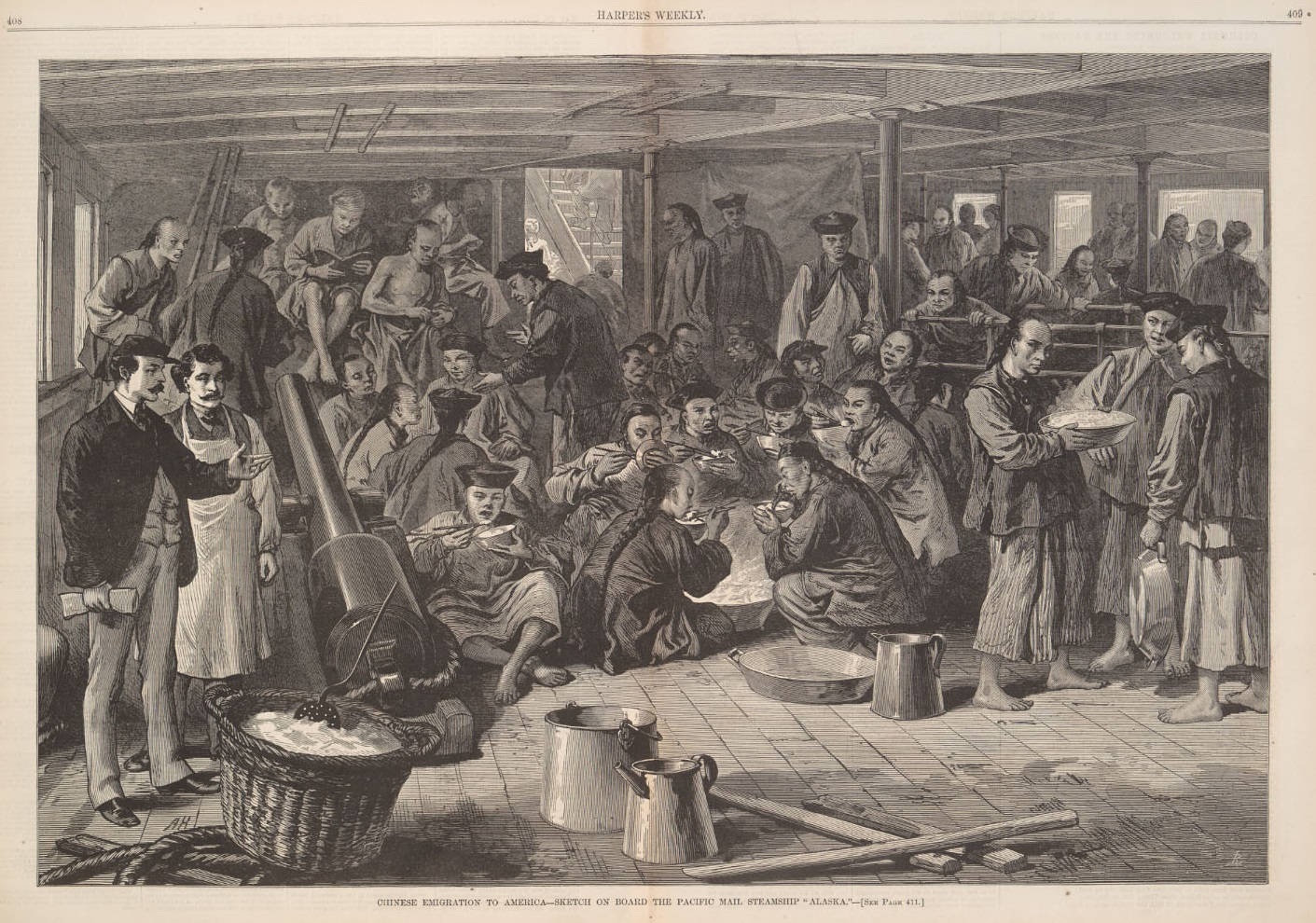
A boat of Chinese immigrants being searched for opium in San Francisco 1876

The newly brought in act was but another in a long line from 1848 that set out to curtail the use of drugs for recreational purposes, most of which started from San Francisco area with the attempt to curtail opium smoking, first by banning the smoking in public, exempting opium dens, until finally going for an all out ban, nationwide in 1922. Before the Jones-Miller Act laws were passed on a state by state basis.

== Opium Importation Prohibition of 1909 ==
60th United States Congress passed House bill H.R. 27427, better known as the Smoking Opium Exclusion Act of 1909, which U.S. President Theodore Roosevelt enacted into law on February 9, 1909. Public Law 60-221 was effective after the first day of April 1909 imposing an unlawful Act to import any derivative, any form, or preparation of opium into the United States. The statutory law authorizes the importation of the psychoactive drug provided any opium derivatives and preparations will be for medicinal purposes only.

== Amendments to 1922 Act ==
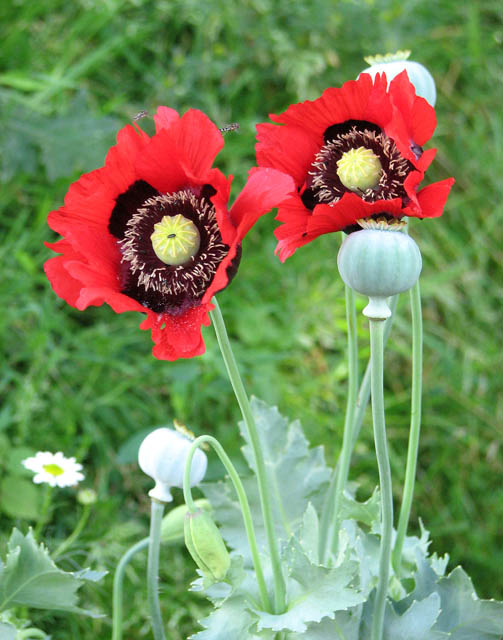
The Jones-Miller Act of 1922 was primarily concerned with banning the recreational consumption of opium and to control the quality of medical opiates

U.S. Congressional amendments to the Narcotic Drugs Import and Export Act, and for other purposes.

Date of Enactment	Public Law No.	U.S. Statute	U.S. Bill	U.S. President
December 11, 1942	P.L. 77-797	56 Stat. 1045	H.R. 7568	Franklin D. Roosevelt
July 1, 1944	P.L. 78-400	58 Stat. 674	H.J.Res. 241	Franklin D. Roosevelt
July 1, 1944	P.L. 78-414	58 Stat. 721	H.R. 4881	Franklin D. Roosevelt
August 8, 1953	P.L. 83-240	67 Stat. 505	H.R. 5561	Dwight D. Eisenhower
July 18, 1956	P.L. 84-728	70 Stat. 567	H.R. 11619	Dwight D. Eisenhower
June 21, 1966	P.L. 89-464	80 Stat. 213	H.R. 13733	Lyndon B. Johnson
December 28, 1973	P.L. 93-218	87 Stat. 912	S. 2166	Richard M. Nixon

== See also ==
- Anti-Heroin Act of 1924
- Harrison Narcotics Tax Act
- Narcotic
- Narcotic Farms Act of 1929
- Opium Poppy Control Act of 1942
- Uniform State Narcotic Drug Act
