= Convention for the Suppression of the Illicit Traffic in Dangerous Drugs =

1936 drug control treaty

- Signed: June 26, 1936
- Location: Geneva
- Effective: October 26, 1939
- Parties: 35

The Convention for the Suppression of the Illicit Traffic in Dangerous Drugs was a drug control treaty signed in 1936.

Harry Anslinger - representing the United States - attempted to add provisions to criminalize all activities. Such activities included the cultivation, production, manufacture and distribution, as well as the use of opium, coca (and its derivatives) and cannabis for non-medical and non-scientific purposes. Other countries objected to this proposal, so the convention's focus remained on trafficking. The U.S. considered the final treaty to be too weak, and refused to sign it, fearing that it might have to weaken its own controls to comply with the treaty. The Convention therefore had little effect, although it was the first treaty to make certain drug offenses international crimes; all previous treaties had dealt with regulating licit drug activity.
