= Comprehensive Drug Abuse Prevention and Control Act of 1970 =

United States anti-drug law

- Long title: An Act to amend the Public Health Service Act and other laws to provide increased research, into, and prevention of, drug abuse and drug dependence; to provide for treatment and rehabilitation of drug abusers and drug dependent persons; and to strengthen existing law enforcement authority in the field of drug abuse.
- Acronyms (colloquial): CDAPCA
- Enacted by: the 91st United States Congress
- Effective: October 27, 1970

Citations
- Public law: 91-513
- Statutes at Large: 84 Stat. 1236

Codification
- Titles amended: 21 U.S.C.: Food and Drugs
- U.S.C. sections created: 21 U.S.C. ch. 13 § 801 et seq.; 21 U.S.C. ch. 13 § 951 et seq.

Legislative history
- Introduced in the House as H.R. 18583 by Harley O. Staggers (D–WV) on September 10, 1970; Committee consideration by Interstate and Foreign Commerce Committee and Senate Judiciary Committee; Passed the House on September 24, 1970 (341–6); Passed the Senate on October 7, 1970 (54–0); Reported by the joint conference committee on October 13, 1970; agreed to by the House on October 14, 1970 (passed) and by the Senate on October 14, 1970 (passed); Signed into law by President Richard M. Nixon on October 27, 1970

The Comprehensive Drug Abuse Prevention and Control Act of 1970, Pub. L. 91–513, 84 Stat. 1236, enacted October 27, 1970, is a United States federal law that, with subsequent modifications, requires the pharmaceutical industry to maintain physical security and strict record keeping for certain types of drugs. Controlled substances are divided into five schedules (or classes) on the basis of their potential for abuse, accepted medical use, and accepted safety under medical supervision. Substances in Schedule I have a high potential for abuse, no accredited medical use, and a lack of accepted safety. From Schedules II to V, substances decrease in potential for abuse. The schedule a substance is placed in determines how it must be controlled. Prescriptions for drugs in all schedules must bear the physician's federal Drug Enforcement Administration (DEA) license number, but some drugs in Schedule V do not require a prescription. State schedules may vary from federal schedules.

The Controlled Substances Act (CSA), Title II of the Comprehensive Drug Abuse Prevention and Control Act of 1970, is the legal foundation of the government's fight against the abuse of drugs and other substances. This law is a consolidation of numerous laws regulating the manufacture and distribution of narcotics, stimulants, depressants, hallucinogens, anabolic steroids, and chemicals used in the illicit production of controlled substances. The act also provides a mechanism for substances to be controlled, added to a schedule, decontrolled, removed from control, rescheduled, or transferred from one schedule to another.

Proceedings to add, delete, or change the schedule of a drug or other substance may be initiated by the Drug Enforcement Administration (DEA), the Department of Health and Human Services (HHS), or by petition from any interested party, including the manufacturer of a drug, a medical society or association, a pharmacy association, a public interest group concerned with drug abuse, a state or local government agency, or an individual citizen. When a petition is received by the DEA, the agency begins its own investigation of the drug.

The DEA also may begin an investigation of a drug at any time based upon information received from law enforcement laboratories, state and local law enforcement and regulatory agencies, or other sources of information.

Once the DEA has collected the necessary data, the Administrator of the Drug Enforcement Association, by authority of the Attorney General, requests from the HHS a scientific and medical evaluation and recommendation as to whether the drug or other substance should be controlled or removed from control. This request is sent to the Assistant Secretary of Health of the HHS. Then, the HHS solicits information from the Commissioner of the Food and Drug Administration and evaluations and recommendations from the National Institute on Drug Abuse, and on occasion, from the scientific and medical community. The Assistant Secretary, by authority of the Secretary, compiles the information and transmits back to the DEA a medical and scientific evaluation regarding the drug or other substance, a recommendation as to whether the drug should be controlled, and in what schedule it should be placed.

The medical and scientific evaluations are binding to the DEA with respect to scientific and medical matters. The recommendation on scheduling is binding only to the extent that if HHS recommends that the substance not be controlled, the DEA may not control the substance.

Once the DEA has received the scientific and medical evaluation from HHS, the Administrator will evaluate all available data and make a final decision whether to propose that a drug or other substance be controlled and into which schedule it should be placed.

The CSA also creates a closed system of distribution for those authorized to handle controlled substances. The cornerstone of this system is the registration of all those authorized by the DEA to handle controlled substances. All individuals and firms that are registered are required to maintain complete and accurate inventories and records of all transactions involving controlled substances, as well as security for the storage of controlled substances.

== See also ==
- Controlled Substances Act
- Drug abuse
- Psychotropic Substances Act of 1978
