= Convention for Limiting the Manufacture and Regulating the Distribution of Narcotic Drugs =

1931 drug control treaty

1931 Limitation Convention
Convention for Limiting the Manufacture and Regulating the Distribution of Narcotic Drugs
- Signed: 13 July 1931
- Location: Geneva
- Effective: 9 July 1933
- Condition: Ratifications or accessions of twenty-five Members of the League of Nations or non-member States, including any four of the following: France, Germany, United Kingdom of Great Britain and Northern Ireland, Japan, Netherlands, Switzerland, Turkey, and the United States of America.
- Expiration: 1968
- Depositary: League of Nations

The Convention for Limiting the Manufacture and Regulating the Distribution of Narcotic Drugs was a drug control treaty promulgated in Geneva on 13 July 1931 that entered into force on 9 July 1933.

== History ==
The conference was held in Geneva on or about 27 May 1931.

After World War II, the 1931 convention's scope was broadened considerably by the 1948 Protocol Bringing under International Control Drugs outside the Scope of the Convention of 13 July 1931 for Limiting the Manufacture and Regulating the Distribution of Narcotic Drugs. In 1968, the convention was superseded by the 1961 Single Convention on Narcotic Drugs, as it entered into force.

== Overview ==
=== Schedules ===
It established two groups of drugs.

Group I consisted of:

- Sub-group (a), which consisted of:
  - Morphine and its salts, including its ester salts like morphine diacetate (heroin) and preparations made directly from raw or medicinal opium and containing more than 20 percent of morphine;
  - Cocaine and its salts, including preparations made direct from the coca leaf and containing more than 0.1 percent of cocaine, all the esters of ecgonine and their salts;
  - Dihydrohydrooxycodeinone (of which the substance registered under the name of eucodal is a salt), dihydrocodeinone (of which the substance registered under the name of dicodide is a salt), dihydromorphinone (of which the substance registered under the name of dilaudide is a salt), acetyldihydrocodeinone or acetyldemethylodihydrothebaine (of which the substance registered under the name of acedicone is a salt); dihydromorphine (of which the substance registered under the name of paramorfan is a salt), their esters and the salts of any of these substances and of their esters, morphine-N-oxide (registered trade name genomorphine), also the morphine-N-oxide derivatives, and the other pentavalent nitrogen morphine derivatives.
- Sub-group (b), which consisted of:
  - Ecgonine, thebaine and their salts, benzylmorphine and the other ethers of morphine and their salts, except methylmorphine (codeine), ethylmorphine and their salts.

Group II consisted of:

- Methylmorphine (codeine), ethylmorphine and their salts.

Group I was subject to stricter regulations than Group II. For instance, in estimating the amount of drugs needed for medical and scientific needs, the margin allowed for demand fluctuations was wider for Group II drugs than for Group I drugs. Also, in certain reports, a summary statement would be sufficient for matters related to Group II drugs. The establishment of these rudimentary groups foreshadowed the development of the drug scheduling system that exists today. Both the 1961 Single Convention on Narcotic Drugs and the 1971 Convention on Psychotropic Substances have schedules of controlled substances. The 1988 United Nations Convention Against Illicit Traffic in Narcotic Drugs and Psychotropic Substances has two tables of controlled precursor chemicals.

=== Drug Supervisory Body ===
The Drug Supervisory Body (sometimes called "Opium Supersiory Body", and in French "Organe de Contrôle") was established under the 1931 Convention to compile estimates of the amount of drugs to be consumed, manufactured, converted, exported, imported, or used by each country.

One member of the Body was nominated by the Office international d'hygiène publique (general health advisory council of the League of Nations' Health Organization).

The Body should not be confused with the Permanent Central Opium Board established under the Second International Opium Convention of 1925, although both the Body and the Board were merged onto the International Narcotics Control Board when the Single Convention on Narcotic Drugs entered into force in 1968.
