= Title 21 of the United States Code =

U.S. federal statutes on food and drugs

Title 21 of the United States Code governs Food and Drugs in the United States Code (U.S.C.).

== Title 21 — Food and Drugs ==
Title 21 has 26 chapters:

- 21 U.S.C. ch. 1 — Adulterated or Misbranded Foods or Drugs (§§ 1—26)
- 21 U.S.C. ch. 2 — Teas (repealed) (§§ 41–50)
- 21 U.S.C. ch. 3 — Filled Milk (§§ 61–64)
  - Filled Milk Act
- 21 U.S.C. ch. 4 — Animals, Meats, and Meat and Dairy Products (§§ 71–149)
- 21 U.S.C. ch. 5 — Viruses, Serums, Toxins, Antitoxins, and Analogous Products (§§ 151–159)
- 21 U.S.C. ch. 5A — [Bureau of Narcotics] (omitted) (§§ 161–165)
  - former Federal Bureau of Narcotics
- 21 U.S.C. ch. 6 — [Narcotic Drugs] (repealed or transferred)
- 21 U.S.C. ch. 7 — Practice of Pharmacy and Sale of Poisons in Consular Districts in China
- 21 U.S.C. ch. 8 — Narcotic Farms (repealed)
- 21 U.S.C. ch. 9 — Federal Food, Drug, and Cosmetic Act
- 21 U.S.C. ch. 10 — Poultry and Poultry Products Inspection
  - Poultry Products Inspection Act of 1957
- 21 U.S.C. ch. 11 — Manufacture of Narcotic Drugs (repealed)
- 21 U.S.C. ch. 12 — Meat Inspection
  - Meat Inspection Act of 1906
- 21 U.S.C. ch. 13 — Drug Abuse Prevention and Control
  - Controlled Substances Act, a part of the Comprehensive Drug Abuse Prevention and Control Act of 1970.
- 21 U.S.C. ch. 14 — [Alcohol and Drug Abuse Educational Programs and Activities] (repealed)
- 21 U.S.C. ch. 15 — Egg Products Inspection
- 21 U.S.C. ch. 16 — Drug Abuse Prevention, Treatment, and Rehabilitation
- 21 U.S.C. ch. 17 — [National Drug Enforcement Policy] (repealed)
- 21 U.S.C. ch. 18 — Presidents Media Commission on Alcohol and Drug Abuse Prevention
- 21 U.S.C. ch. 19 — Pesticide Monitoring Improvements
- 21 U.S.C. ch. 20 — National Drug Control Program
- 21 U.S.C. ch. 21 — Biomaterials Access Assurance
- 21 U.S.C. ch. 22 — National Drug Control Policy
  - Office of National Drug Control Policy
- 21 U.S.C. ch. 23 — [National Youth Anti-Drug Media Campaign] (repealed)
- 21 U.S.C. ch. 24 — International Narcotics Trafficking
- 21 U.S.C. ch. 25 — Miscellaneous Anti-Drug Abuse Provisions

== See also ==
- Title 21 of the Code of Federal Regulations – Food and Drugs
