= Amon of Toul =

Catholic bishop of Toul, saint (fl 375 - c. 423)

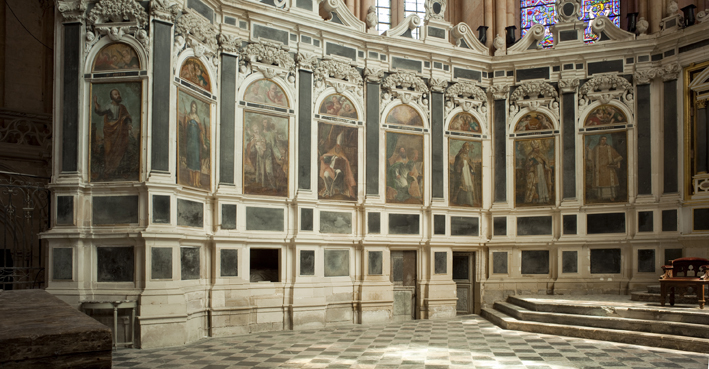
Portrait of Amon in the apse of Toul Cathedral

Saint Amon of Toul (otherwise Aimo or Amand) (fl. 375; date of death unknown, but perhaps c 423) was the second recorded bishop of Toul and is venerated as a saint by the Roman Catholic Church.

== Biography ==
Little is now known of Amon except for his name and office, although there are legends about him. He was the successor of Saint Mansuy as bishop of Toul, a post he held from around 375 to his death. This is sometimes placed in around 423, but could have taken place considerably earlier or later. There is a tradition, for example, that he left the city of Toul to escape the devastating retreat of Attila the Hun and his forces after their defeat at the Battle of Châlons in 451. A rock, which was an obstacle on the road of the prelate, was said to have opened and closed over him to hide him from his barbarous pursuers. Today this place, a small rise overlooking the village of Goviller, is called the "Bois d'Anon" ("Amon's wood").

He is believed to have lived a penitential life and often retreated to a cave with adjoining cells for his priests in the forest of the Saintois, where a hermitage bore his name in the village of Saulxerotte. The tradition relates that he himself dedicated this "hermitage-chapel" (of which there is now no trace) to the Virgin Mary and that his relics were buried there. At the time, "Saint-Amon" was considered a hamlet in the area surrounding Saulxerotte.

His successor as bishop was Alchas.

== Veneration ==
Amon was declared a saint by the Catholic Church with a feast day celebrated in the Diocese of Toul on October 23. His portrait may be seen in the apse of Toul Cathedral.

The Collegiate Church of St Gengoult in Toul was reported in 1836 to have "several parts of the clothing and hair-shirt of Saint Amon; these relics (...) are shut up higgledy-piggledy with many bones in an old wooden casket preserved in the tomb of the high altar."

== Sources ==
- Katolsk.no: Amon av Toul (in Norwegian)
