= Gelsimus of Toul =

Saint Gelsimus of Toul, also known as Saint Celsin (fl. 445), was the fourth bishop of Toul. He is venerated as a saint by the Roman Catholic Church.

He is known only from a mention of his name in the manuscript of Adso and in the epitaphs of the bishops of Toul. He is dated to around 445 and in the succession of the bishops comes after Saint Alchas and before Saint Auspicius.
