= Alchas of Toul =

Saint Alchas (fl. 420) was the third bishop of Toul. He is venerated as a saint by the Roman Catholic Church.

He is known only from a mention of his name in the manuscript of Adso and in the epitaphs of the bishops of Toul. He is dated to the year 420 and in the succession of the bishops comes after Saint Amon and before Saint Gelsimus.
