= Berthold of Toul =

German bishop of Toul (died 1018)

Berthold, Bertholde or Bertholdus of Toul (died 25 September 1018, Toul) was a German Roman Catholic clergyman.

== Life ==
He was the thirty-sixth bishop of Toul, succeeding Robert. The clergy of Toul confirmed his nomination by Otto III, Holy Roman Emperor due to his piety. He was consecrated on 3 October 995 by Ludolf of Trier, who proposed that he model his life on his predecessor Gerard of Toul. He held the post until his death.

At Toul, Berthold had a school for the sons of the nobility. Five-year-old Bruno of Egisheim-Dagsburg, son of Emperor Conrad II's first cousin, Count Hugo, was entrusted to Bishop Berthold to be educated. Bruno later became Pope Leo IX.

== Sources ==
- Dom Augustin Calmet, Histoire ecclésiastique et civile de la Lorraine, Nancy, 1728, 4 vol., in-fol.
- A.D. Thiéry, Histoire de la ville de Toul et de ses évêques, suivie d'une notice de la cathédrale
