= July 15 (Eastern Orthodox liturgics) =

Day in the Eastern Orthodox liturgical calendar

Eastern Orthodox liturgical calendar
| July 14 | July 15 | July 16 |
July 15 O.S. ≍ July 28 N.S. July 15 N.S ≍ July 2 O.S.

An Eastern Orthodox cross

July 15 in Eastern Orthodox liturgical calendars is a feast day and a day of commemoration of saints and martyrs. Although some Orthodox churches use the Revised Julian Calendar and others use the traditional Julian calendar, the fixed commemorations for their respective July 15 are broadly the same, no matter which calendar is used. (Note: Despite the dates being the same, the days to which they refer typically differ by 13 days. The notation Old Style or O.S. is sometimes used to indicate a date in the traditional Julian Calendar (the "Old Calendar"). The notation New Style or N.S. indicates a date in the Revised Julian calendar (the "New Calendar").)

== Saints ==
- Martyrs Cyricus (Quiricus) and his mother Julitta, of Tarsus (c. 305) (Note: Name days celebrated today include: Kirikos, Cyricus (Κήρυκος); Julia (Ἰουλία); Julitta (Ἰουλίtτα).)
- Martyr Lolianus, kicked to death.
- Martyr Abudimus of the isle of Tenedos (4th century) (Note: "In the island of Tenedos, St. Abudemius, a martyr, who suffered under Diocletian.")
- Saint Asiya the Wonderworker, of Tanis in Syria (5th century)
- Holy Equal-to-the-Apostles Great Prince Vladimir the Great (Basil in holy baptism), Enlightener of the Russian Land (1015) (Note: Name days celebrated today include: Vladimir (Βλαδίμηρος).)

== Pre-Schism Western saints ==
- Saints Eutropius, Zosima and Bonosa, martyrs in Porto near Rome under Aurelian (c. 273) (Note: "At Porto, the birthday of the holy martyrs Eutropius, and the sisters Zosima and Bonosa.")
- Saints Secundinus, Agrippinus, Maximus, Fortunatus and Martialis, martyrs in Pannonia (4th century)
- Saints Catulinus (Cartholinus), Januarius, Florentius, Julia and Justa, martyrs in Carthage in North Africa. (Note: "At Carthage, blessed Catulinus, deacon, whose glories were proclaimed by St. Augustine in a sermon to his people, and the Saints Januarius, Florentius, Julia and Justa, martyrs, who were entombed in the church of St. Faustus.")
- Saint Apronia (Evronie), the sister of Bishop Aprus of Toul, from whom she received the veil (sixth century)
- Saint Felix of Pavia, a martyr in Pavia in Italy. (Note: "At Pavia, St. Felix, bishop and martyr.")
- Saint Aeternus (Eternus), ninth Bishop of Evreux in France (c. 660)
- Saint Donald of Ogilvy (c. 716) and his nine virgin daughters, nuns of Abernathy, Scotland.
- Saint Benedict of Angers, Bishop of Angers in the west of France (c. 820)
- Saint Adalard of Corbie, called the younger, he was a monk at Corbie in France (c. 824)
- Saint Haruch, Bishop near Werden in Germany (c. 830)
- Saint Athanasius of Naples, Bishop of Naples in Italy (872) (Note: "At Naples, in Campania, St. Athanasius, bishop of that city, who suffered much from his wicked nephew Sergius, by whom he was driven from his see. Consumed with afflictions, he departed for heaven at Veroli, in the time of Charles the Bald.")
- Saint Edith of Polesworth, Abbess of Polesworth in England and a sister of a King of England (c. 925)

== Post-Schism Orthodox saints ==
- Saint Zosima, monk, of Alexandrov, Vladimir (c. 1713)
- Saint Job (Kundrya), Archimandrite, of Malaya Ugolka, (Note: See: (in Ukrainian) Мала Уголька. Вікіпедія. (Ukrainian Wikipedia).) Carpatho-Russia (1985) (Note: St. Job was a monk, abbot of the monastery in Mukachevo and later exiled by the Communist authorities to the remote village church in Malaya Ugolka. Here in the village church, Father Job faithfully served for 23 years, becoming known as a starets or elder as people flocked to him for advice and guidance. He was known to be clairvoyant and the worker of miracles. He died peacefully in 1985 and was glorified as a saint in 2008.) (Note: See: (in Russian) Иов Угольский. Википедии. (Russian Wikipedia).) (see also: October 9 - Uncovering of relics)

=== New martyrs and confessors ===
- New Hieromartyr Peter Troitsky, Deacon (1938)

== Other commemorations ==
- Translation of the relics (971) of St. Swithun, Bishop and Wonderworker, of Winchester (863)
- Finding of the head of Saint Matrona of Chios (1462) (see also: October 20)
- Synaxis of All Saints of Kiev.

== Icon gallery ==
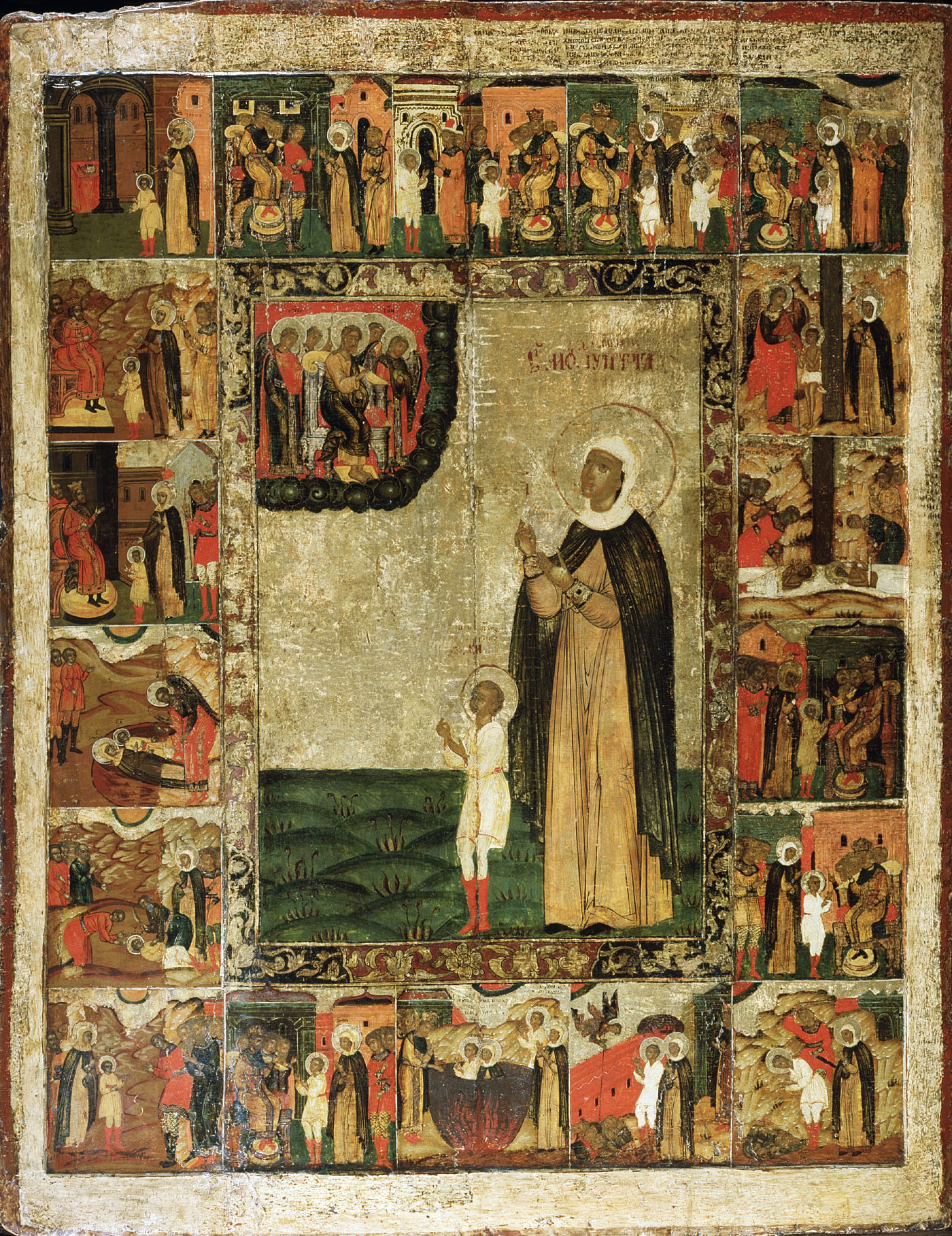
Martyrs Cyricus (Quiricus) and his mother Julitta.

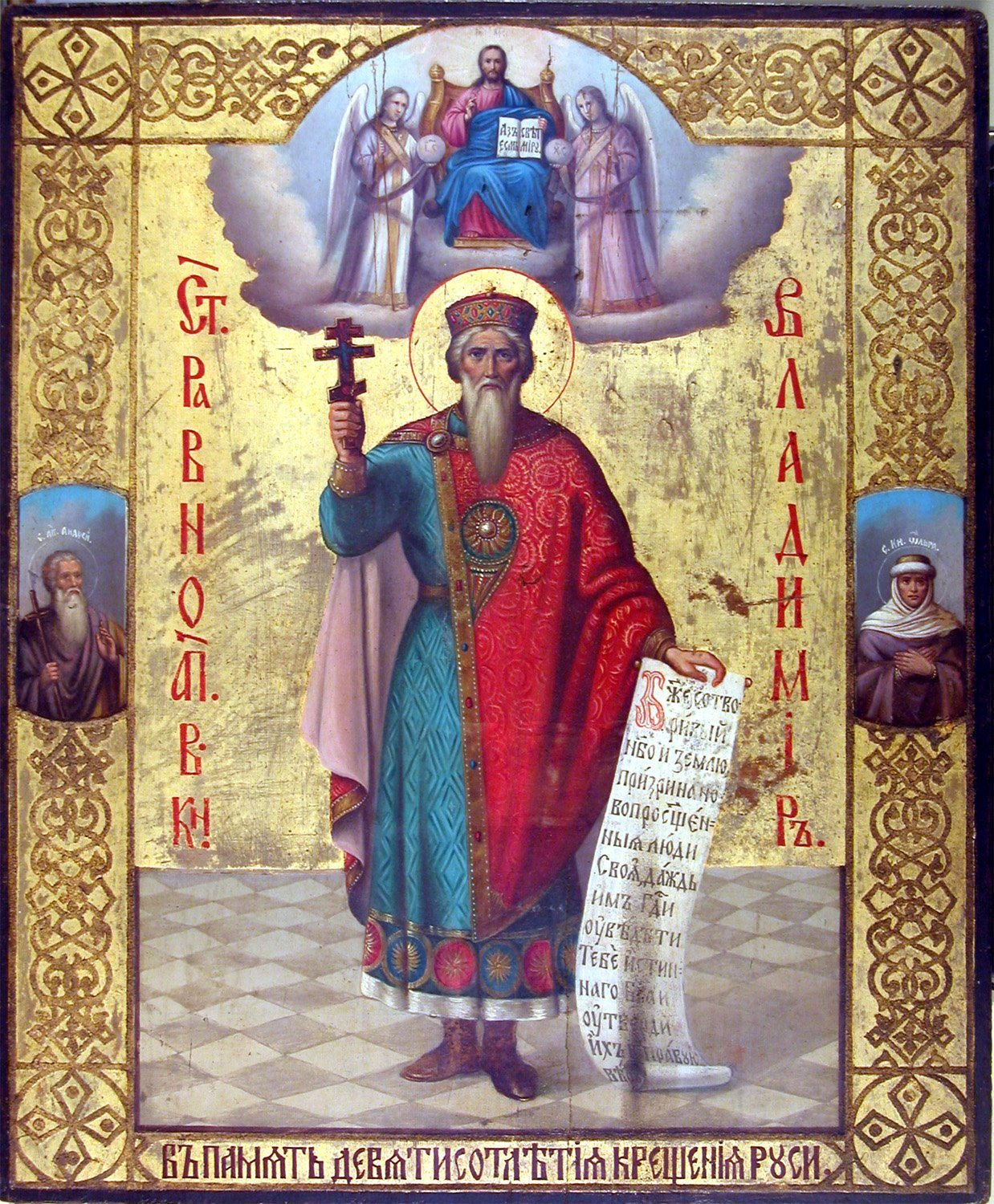
Equal-to-the-Apostles Great Prince Vladimir the Great (Basil in holy baptism).

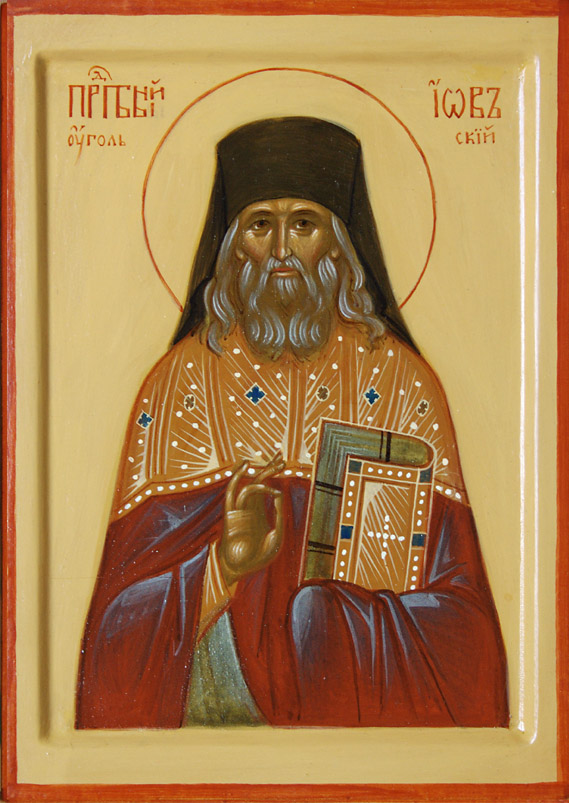
St. Job (Kundrya), Archimandrite, of Malaya Ugolka, Carpatho-Russia.

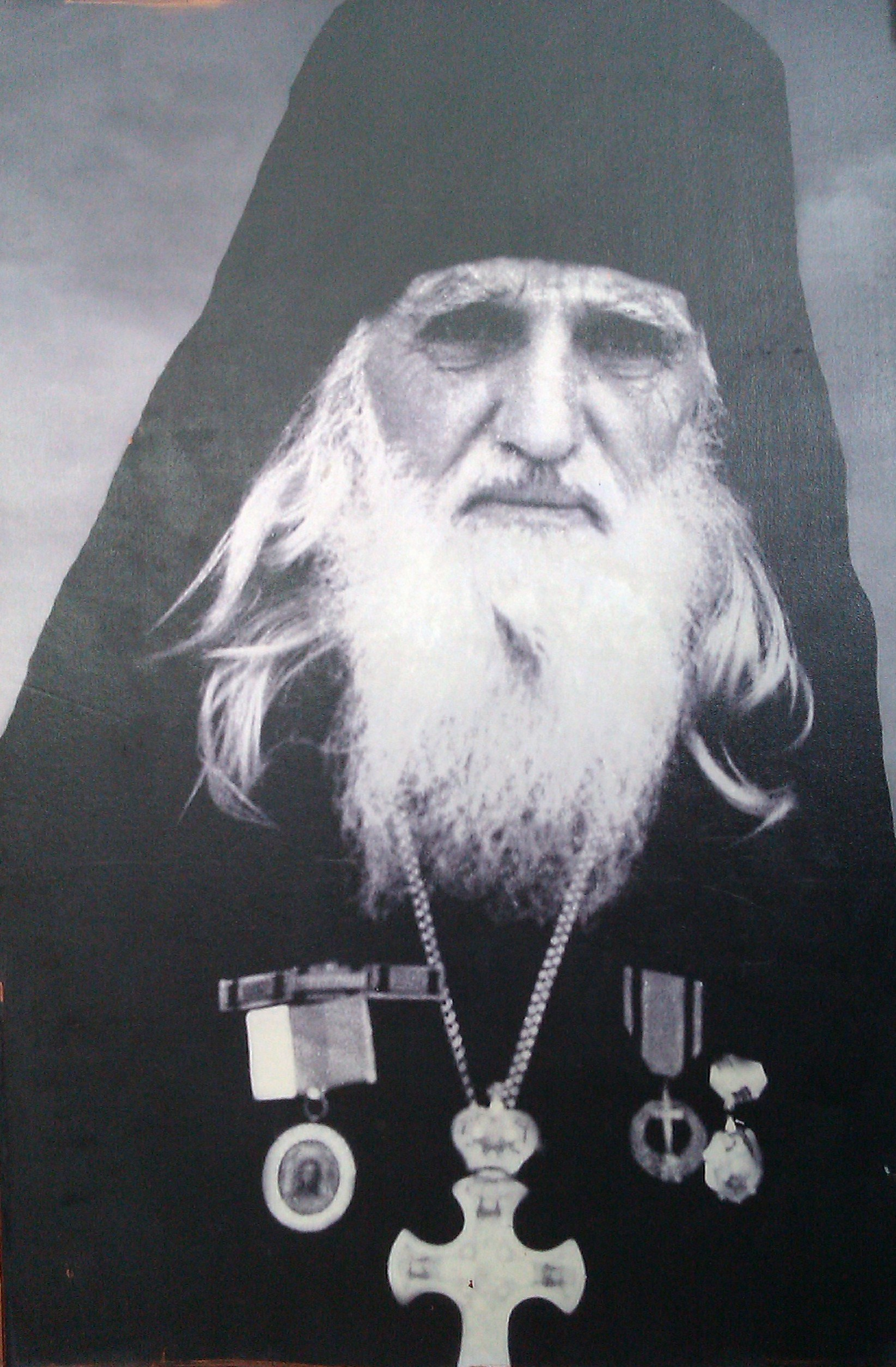
St. Job (Kundrya), Archimandrite, of Malaya Ugolka, Carpatho-Russia.

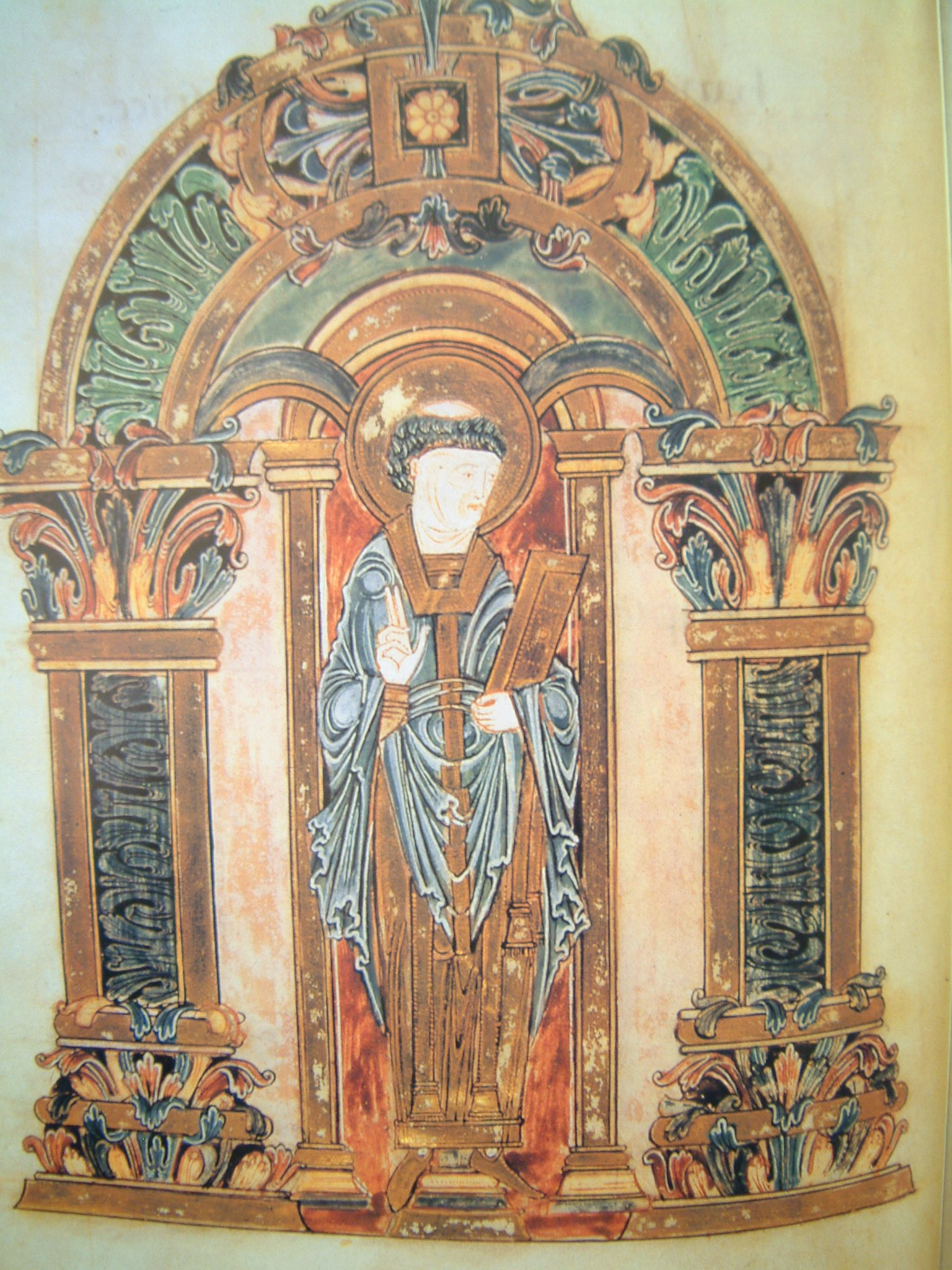
St. Swithun, Bishop and Wonderworker, of Winchester.

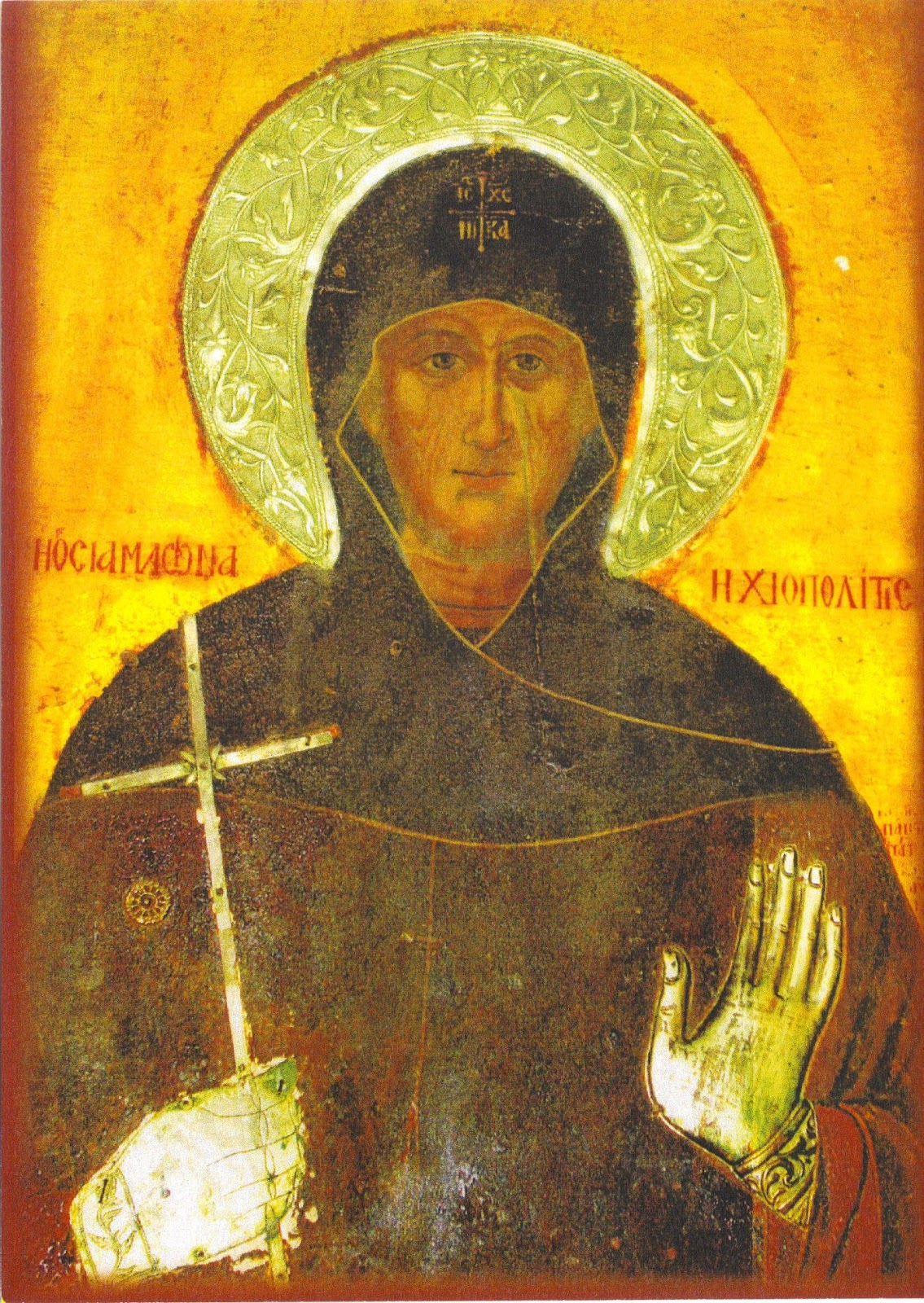
St. Matrona of Chios.

== Sources ==
- July 15/July 28. Orthodox Calendar (PRAVOSLAVIE.RU).
- July 28 / July 15. HOLY TRINITY RUSSIAN ORTHODOX CHURCH (A parish of the Patriarchate of Moscow).
- July 15. OCA - The Lives of the Saints.
- July 15. The Year of Our Salvation - Holy Transfiguration Monastery, Brookline, Massachusetts.
- The Autonomous Orthodox Metropolia of Western Europe and the Americas (ROCOR). St. Hilarion Calendar of Saints for the year of our Lord 2004. St. Hilarion Press (Austin, TX). p. 52.
- The Fifteenth Day of the Month of July. Orthodoxy in China.
- July 15. Latin Saints of the Orthodox Patriarchate of Rome.
- The Roman Martyrology. Transl. by the Archbishop of Baltimore. Last Edition, According to the Copy Printed at Rome in 1914. Revised Edition, with the Imprimatur of His Eminence Cardinal Gibbons. Baltimore: John Murphy Company, 1916. pp. 207–208.
- Rev. Richard Stanton. A Menology of England and Wales, or, Brief Memorials of the Ancient British and English Saints Arranged According to the Calendar, Together with the Martyrs of the 16th and 17th Centuries. London: Burns & Oates, 1892. pp. 337–341.

Greek Sources

- Great Synaxaristes: (in Greek) 15 ΙΟΥΛΙΟΥ. ΜΕΓΑΣ ΣΥΝΑΞΑΡΙΣΤΗΣ.
- (in Greek) Συναξαριστής. 15 Ιουλίου. ECCLESIA.GR. (H ΕΚΚΛΗΣΙΑ ΤΗΣ ΕΛΛΑΔΟΣ).
- (in Greek) 15/07/2018. Ορθόδοξος Συναξαριστής.

Russian Sources

- (in Russian) 28 июля (15 июля). Православная Энциклопедия под редакцией Патриарха Московского и всея Руси Кирилла (электронная версия). (Orthodox Encyclopedia - Pravenc.ru).
- (in Russian) 15 июля по старому стилю / 28 июля по новому стилю. СПЖ "Союз православных журналистов". 2018.
- (in Russian) 15 июля (ст.ст.) 28 июля 2014 (нов. ст.). Русская Православная Церковь Отдел внешних церковных связей. (DECR).
