= Era of the Martyrs =

Calendar era used by Alexandrian churches

Today (at UTC+00)
- Tuesday, 28 July 2026
- Coptic: 21 Epip, AM 1742
Other calendars
| Armenian | 8 Nawasardi 1476 |
| Bengali | 13 Shrabon, BS 1433 |
| Chinese | Yin Water Rabbit・Tail Mansion; 16 Liùyuè, Bǐngwǔnián (Dashu, 10 days until Liqiu) |
| Common Era | 28 July 2026 CE |
| Egyptian | 13 Choiak, NE 2775 |
| Ethiopian | 21 Ḥamlē, AD 2018 |
| French Republican | Décade I, Décadi de Thermidor de l'Année 234 de la République |
| Gregorian | 28 July, AD 2026 |
| Hebrew | 14 Av, AM 5786 |
| Islamic | 12 Safar, AH 1448 (tabular method) |
| ISO week date | 2026-W31-2 |
| Japanese | 15 Minazuki, Reiwa 8 (Taisho, 10 days until Risshū) |
| Julian | 15 July, AD 2026 (AM 7534) |
| Julian day | 2461250 |
| Maya | 13.0.13.14.7; 0 Yaxkin, 5 Manik |
| Roman | Idibus Iuliis, AUC 2779 |
| Solar Hijri | 6 Mordad, SH 1405 |

The Era of the Martyrs (Latin: anno martyrum), also known as the Diocletian era (Latin: anno Diocletiani), is a method of numbering years based on the reign of Roman Emperor Diocletian who instigated the last major persecution against Christians in the Empire. It was used by the Church of Alexandria beginning in the 4th century AD and it has been used by the Coptic Orthodox Church of Alexandria from the 5th century until the present. This era was used to number the year in Easter tables produced by the Church of Alexandria.

Diocletian began his reign on 20 November 284 AD, and the reference epoch (day one of the Diocletian era) was assigned to be the first day of that Alexandrian year, 1 Thoth, the Egyptian New Year, or 29 August 284 AD.

== Alternatives among early Christians ==
The anno Diocletiani era was not the only one used by early Christians. Western Christians were aware of it but did not use it. Most Roman Christians, like the pagan Romans before them, designated their years by naming the two consuls who held office that year.

The Romans also used the ab urbe condita (AUC) era. Its name is Latin for "from the founding of the City (Rome)". However, the AUC era was hardly ever used outside historical treatises.

Eras that began at Creation, called anno Mundi eras, became the dominant method of numbering years in the East until modern times, such as in the Byzantine calendar. Annianus of Alexandria, a monk who flourished at the beginning of the 5th century, placed the epoch of his world era on 25 March 5492 BC by counting back eleven 532-year paschal cycles from anno Diocletiani 77, itself four 19-year lunar cycles after anno Diocletiani 1. Regarded as a civil rather than a religious era, it began on the first day of the Alexandrian year, 29 August 5493 BC. This Alexandrian era was the preferred era used by Byzantine Christians such as Maximus the Confessor, until the 10th century when the Byzantine era, which had an epoch of 1 September 5509 BC, became dominant. Both eras used a version of dating Creation based on the Septuagint.

== Transition to Anno Domini ==
When Dionysius Exiguus, an Eastern Roman of Scythia Minor, inherited the continuation of those tables for an additional 95 years (in the year 525 AD) he replaced the anno Diocletiani era with one based on the birth of Christ: the anno Domini era. His main goal was to marginalize the memory of a tyrant who persecuted Christians. The anno Domini era became dominant in the Latin West but was not used in the Greek East until modern times.

== See also ==
- Adoption of the Gregorian calendar
- Calendar era
- Christian martyrs
- Computus
- Coptic calendar
- Greek East and Latin West
- Martyr
