= Bouxières-aux-Dames =

- Commune
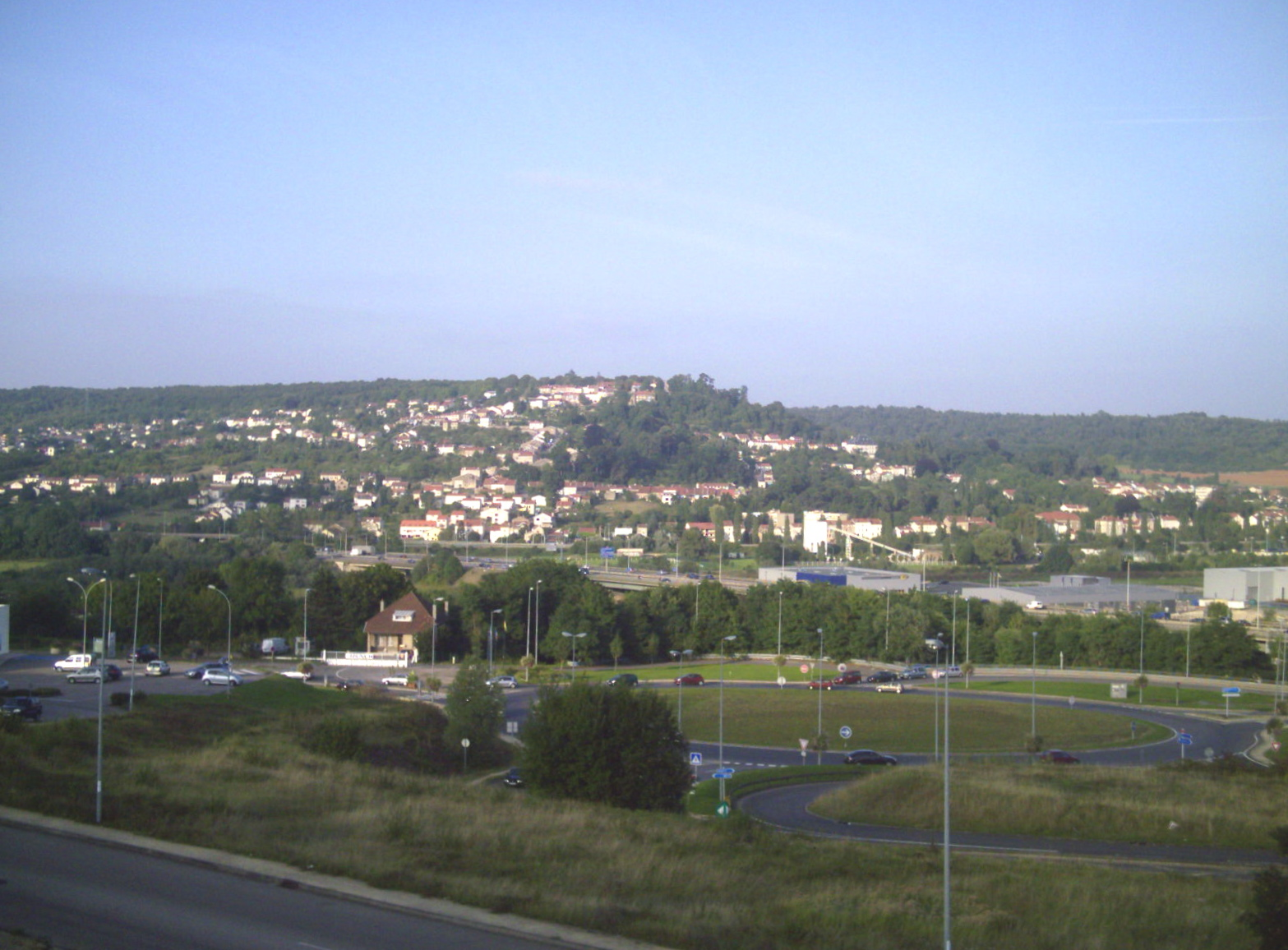
- A general view of Bouxières-aux-Dames

- Coat of arms
- Location of Bouxières-aux-Dames
- Location within France Location within Grand Est
- Coordinates: 48°45′10″N 6°09′49″E
- Country: France
- Region: Grand Est
- Department: Meurthe-et-Moselle
- Arrondissement: Nancy
- Canton: Entre Seille et Meurthe
- Intercommunality: Bassin de Pompey

Government
  - Mayor (2020–2026): Denis Machado
- Area^{1}: 4.11 km^{2} (1.59 sq mi)
- Elevation: 220 m (720 ft)
- Highest elevation: 361 m (1,184 ft)
- Lowest elevation: 180 m (590 ft)
- Population (2023): 4,106
  - Density: 999/km^{2} (2,590/sq mi)
- Demonym: Bouxiérois
- Time zone: UTC+01:00 (CET)
  - Summer (DST): UTC+02:00 (CEST)
- INSEE/Postal code: 54090 /54136
- ^{1} French Land Register data, which excludes lakes, ponds, glaciers > 1 km^{2} (0.386 sq mi or 247 acres) and river estuaries.

Bouxières-aux-Dames (French pronunciation: [buksjɛʁ o dam]) is a commune in the Meurthe-et-Moselle department in northeastern France.

== Geography ==
The village is located on the slope of a hill, directed south-north. It overlooks the confluent of Moselle and of Meurthe within its north-north-west. It is located at the north-north-east of Nancy, along the motorway A31. The village is divided into five parts:

- the top of the village around the remainders of the abbey and the lawn, on the summit part of the hill.
- the heart of the village around the church and the town hall,
- the recent district of Neveaux on the northern side of the hill,
- the district of the Noisetiers in the small valley of the brook of the Moret pond,
- the areas along Meurthe.

== History ==
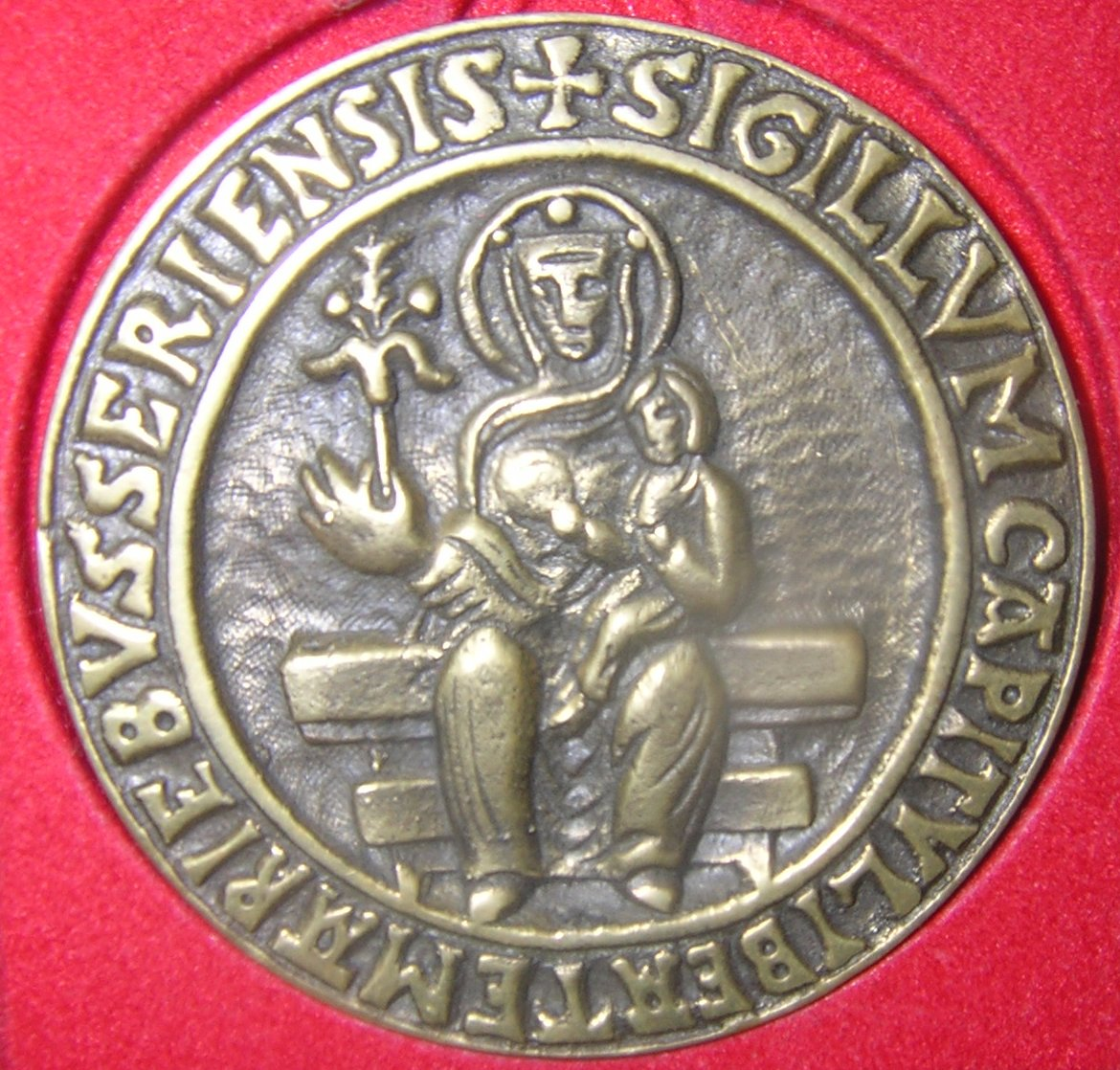
A bronze copy of the seal of the abbey of Bouxières-aux-Dames

The name of Bouxières comes from the Latin word buxus which means 'boxwood'. The history of Bouxières-aux-Dames is closely related to its abbey of chanoinesses or ladies (dames in French), founded by Saint Gauzelin. Issued from a noble Frankish family, he was a notary of the royal chancellery when King Charles the Simple made him bishop of Toul. Following a visit to Fleury Abbey near Saint-Benoît-sur-Loire he founded in Lorraine the male monastery of Saint-Epvre and the female monastery of Bouxières-aux-Dames. He lived in poverty and died into 962. The legend says that a stag appeared to him indicating where to found the abbey. Later on, to be a chanoinesse, several districts of nobility will be required.

The treasure of the abbey is kept in Nancy Cathedral. It comprises in particular five objects: a chalice , a patene , a gospel book covered with a binding of goldsmithery, a ring of the prelate and a comb of ivory. Some rare stone remainders are visible on the top of the hill in "rue des chanoinesses" (chanoinesses street). The abbey persisted until 1787 when the chanoinesses who were bored with Bouxières-aux-Dames wanted to take advantage of the city life and settled in Nancy close to Bonsecours. The abbey was used as a stone quarry and was destroyed after French Revolution. Several houses re-used its stones.

Another significant event in the history of the village is battle of Nancy, 5 January 1477, where, with its mercenaries, condottiere Campobasso betrayed Charles I, Duke of Burgundy and massacred on the bridge of Bouxières the remainders of the flying army of the duke of Burgundy. The chroniclers said that frozen Meurthe was red of blood. Indeed, there were only three bridges on Meurthe at that time in Jarville, Nancy and Bouxières. The troops of Charles I could not pass on western bank and thus had to remain on eastern bank, while trying to flee towards Metz, while troops of Rene II and their allies followed them.

In 1914, the Grand Couronné battle (September 4–13 1914) occurred on the bottom of the hill.

From 1943 to 1947, Marian apparition defrayed the chronicle and divided the parishioners of the village.

== Population ==
Its inhabitants are called Bouxiérois in French.

Historical population

| Year | Pop. | ±% p.a. |
|---|---|---|
| 1793 | 412 | — |
| 1821 | 468 | +0.46% |
| 1846 | 525 | +0.46% |
| 1872 | 632 | +0.72% |
| 1901 | 1,060 | +1.80% |
| 1926 | 1,274 | +0.74% |
| 1946 | 1,241 | −0.13% |
| 1962 | 1,816 | +2.41% |
| 1968 | 2,317 | +4.14% |

| Year | Pop. | ±% p.a. |
|---|---|---|
| 1975 | 4,021 | +8.19% |
| 1982 | 4,817 | +2.61% |
| 1990 | 4,392 | −1.15% |
| 1999 | 4,124 | −0.70% |
| 2007 | 3,994 | −0.40% |
| 2012 | 4,134 | +0.69% |
| 2017 | 4,216 | +0.39% |
| 2023 | 4,106 | −0.44% |

Source: EHESS and INSEE (1968-2023)

== See also ==
- Communes of the Meurthe-et-Moselle department
