= Saint Ours =

Saint Ursus of Toul, known in French as Saint Ours, was a 5th-century French bishop of Toul and a saint of the Roman Catholic Church with a locally venerated feast day celebrated on 1 March.

Ours was elected bishop of Toul in 490, succeeding Saint Auspicius. When the Frankish king Clovis invaded Gaul, Ours welcomed him during his visit to Toul in 496. Clovis requested an ecclesiastic to instruct him in the teaching of Christianity and Bishop Ours designated one of his priests, Saint Waast, to convert the new sovereign.

Ours died at an uncertain date, perhaps around the year 500. His remains were buried initially in the graveyard of Saint-Mansuy. His body was translated, however, in 1026 to the Abbey of St. Mansuy. His successor was Saint Epvre of Toul.

Ours was declared a saint by the Catholic Church. His feast day was formerly celebrated on 4 September but is now celebrated on 1 March.
