= Pierre Camille Le Moine =

Pierre Camille Le Moine (1723–1800), an archivist at Toul Cathedral and then in Lyon was the author of the first printed French monograph entirely devoted to archives and archival management and description, the influential Diplomatique pratique (1765) which advocated the classification of documents by topics rather than in chronological order which had been the standard up until that time.

== Early life ==
Le Moine was born on December 21, 1723, in Paris. He came from humble beginnings as the son of a merchant with whom he worked until his early adulthood. There is not much biographical information available until the late 1740s when he arrived at the abbey at Marmoutier. It is known that he spent a period training under a group of Maurist Benedictine monks who were influential on his future archival activities.

== Formative career ==
In the early 1750s Le Moine established himself working under Guillaume Roussel, the archivist of the cathedral of Saint-Martin in Tours and Dom Guillaume Gerou at the abbey at Marmoutier. During this time, he expanded his concentration on medieval documents and their archival place in libraries and other repositories. Under the guidance of Roussel and Gerou, he was involved in their organization and reference for the benefit of seigneurial lords. Seigneurial and ecclesiastical archives would later become his specialty. After nearly a decade working with Roussel and Gerou, Le Moine started his own activities at the Cathedral Chapter in Tours. Le Moine was responsible for the organization of several smaller archives and archival fonds of ecclesiastical bodies linked to the Tours cathedral.

== La Diplomatique pratique ==
Le Moine is best known for the diplomatique-pratique, a monograph entirely devoted to archives and archival management and description. The Diplomatique pratique was essentially a manual for archivists based on Le Moine’s years of experience working in local and church archives. The book starts with several sections relating to the training of archivists and the character qualities which are necessary and even what is needed to maintain their health under unique working conditions. The main body of the work highlights Le Moine’s core archival protocol which consists of six steps.

Step 1 – Separate documents into high level categories and create containers for each.

Step 2 – Divide each container into bundles based on a coherent subject.

Step 3 – Carefully open and unfold ancient parchments and date each item.

Step 4 - Thorough analysis and assessment of all documents including the detailed study of the contents and theme.*

Step 5 – Ordering of documents using a consistent naming convention and the assignment of shelf numbers.

Step 6 – Create an inventory document as the source of ongoing records management.

* This process was most important to LeMoine since the evaluation of the theme was what differentiated the work of an archivist from that of simple record storage. This process was also challenging because it often involved the review of records in other languages.
