= Frobert of Troyes =

French Roman Catholic saint

Frobert of Troyes, or Frodobert (born in the beginning of the 7th century in Troyes, died in 673 at Saint-André-les-Vergers), was a churchmen and abbot of the Saint-Pierre de Montier-la-Celle Abbey near Saint-André-les-Vergers, an abbey he founded in the middle of the 7th century on part of a royal domain granted him by Clovis II. He began building in 660, and dedicated the church to Saint Peter. He is recognized as a saint by the Catholic church and the Orthodox Church. A hagiography was written by Adso of Montier-en-Der.
