= Apronia of Toul =

6th century German nun and saint

Saint Apronia of Toul
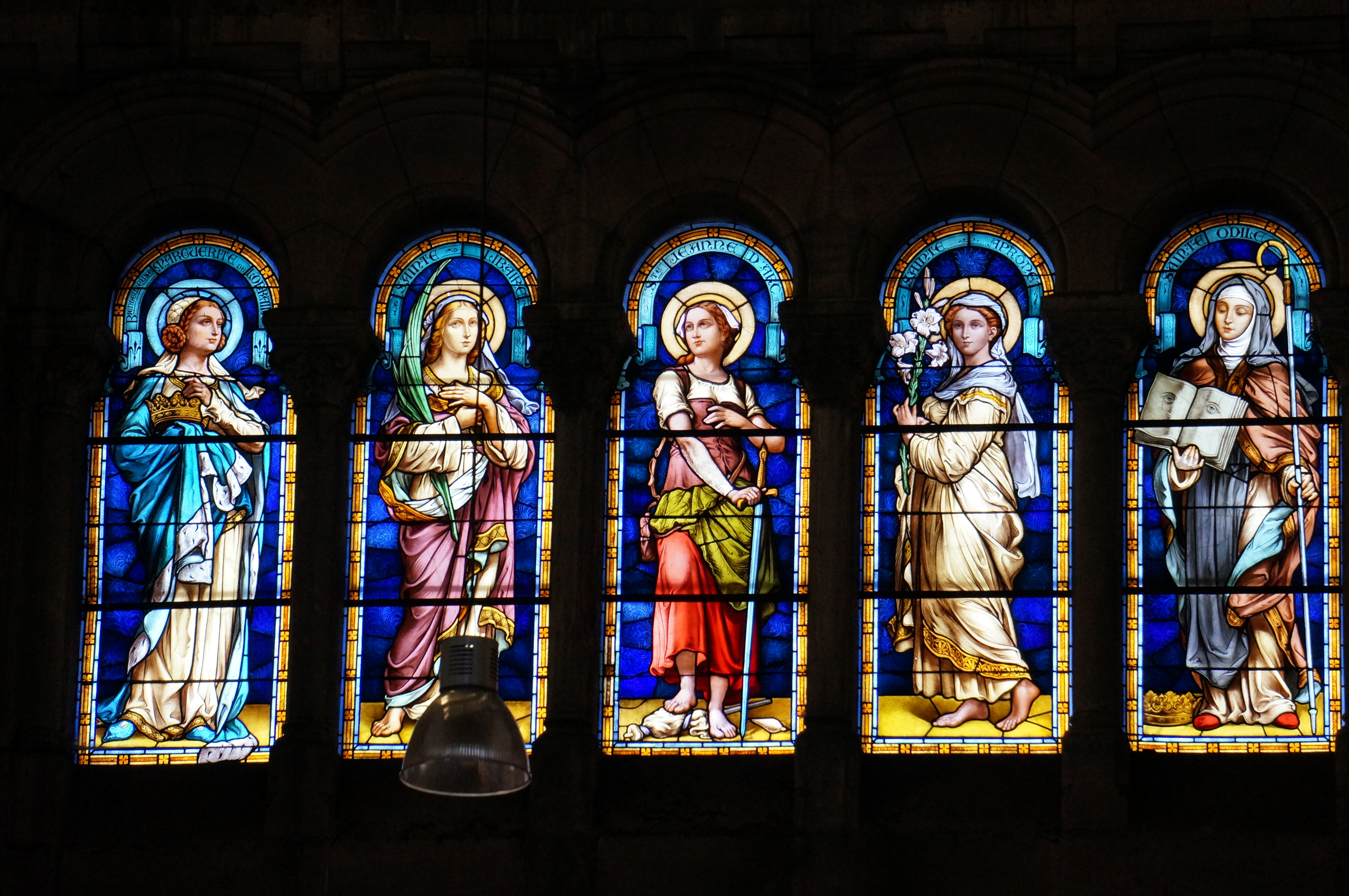

Virgin
- Born: Germany
- Died: Troyes, France
- Venerated in: Catholic Church, Antiochen Orthodox Church
- Major shrine: Toul
- Feast: 15 July

Apronia of Toul, also called Evronie of Troyes, was a nun and saint of the 6th century. She was born at Tranquille, a village in Trier, Germany. Her brother was Saint Aprus of Toul, a bishop in Toul in northeastern France, from whom she received the veil. Hagiographer Sabine Baring-Gould said of Apronia: "Drawn by her love of Christ to a religious life, she led on earth a virginal and angelic life, in imitation of her brother, a man of the highest sanctity. During her life she loved innocence, purity, and holiness, which she preserved till her death". She died in a convent at Troyes, about 140 km (87 mi) southeast of Paris, year unknown, on 15 July, and was enshrined at Toul by the bishop Saint Gerard in 992. She is the patroness saint of women in labor and other dangers.
