= Pippo (bishop of Toul) =

French bishop

Pippo (or Pibo) was the bishop of Toul between 1070 and 1107. He was a Saxon, related through his family to the imperial court. He was the chancellor of Henry IV, Holy Roman Emperor, in 1068.

Pippo was accused of simony, an accusation that led Pope Gregory VII to investigate through Udo, archbishop of Trier, and Hermann, bishop of Metz. He was backed by Henry IV, and ultimately kept his position.

Pippo attended the Synod of Worms in 1076, and signed the document where he renounced his obedience to Rome. Also present at Utrecht later that year, he fled at the last hour to avoid witnessing the excommunication of Pope Gregory VII by Bishop William of Utrecht. He was present at the diet of Tribur (October 1076), where he was reconciled with the church by the legate, Bishop Altmann of Passau.

After the death of Gregory VII in 1085, Pippo went on a pilgrimage to the Holy Land. He was absent until 1087, when he retired to the monastery of Saint Benignus of Dijon. Pope Urban II demanded he goes back to his episcopal office, an order he accepted. Apparently he tried to impose on the clergy some rules, such as forbidding the acceptance of the sons of priests into holy orders.

He died the 25 November 1107.
