= Gauzelin of Toul =

Saint Gauzelin
- Bishop of Toul
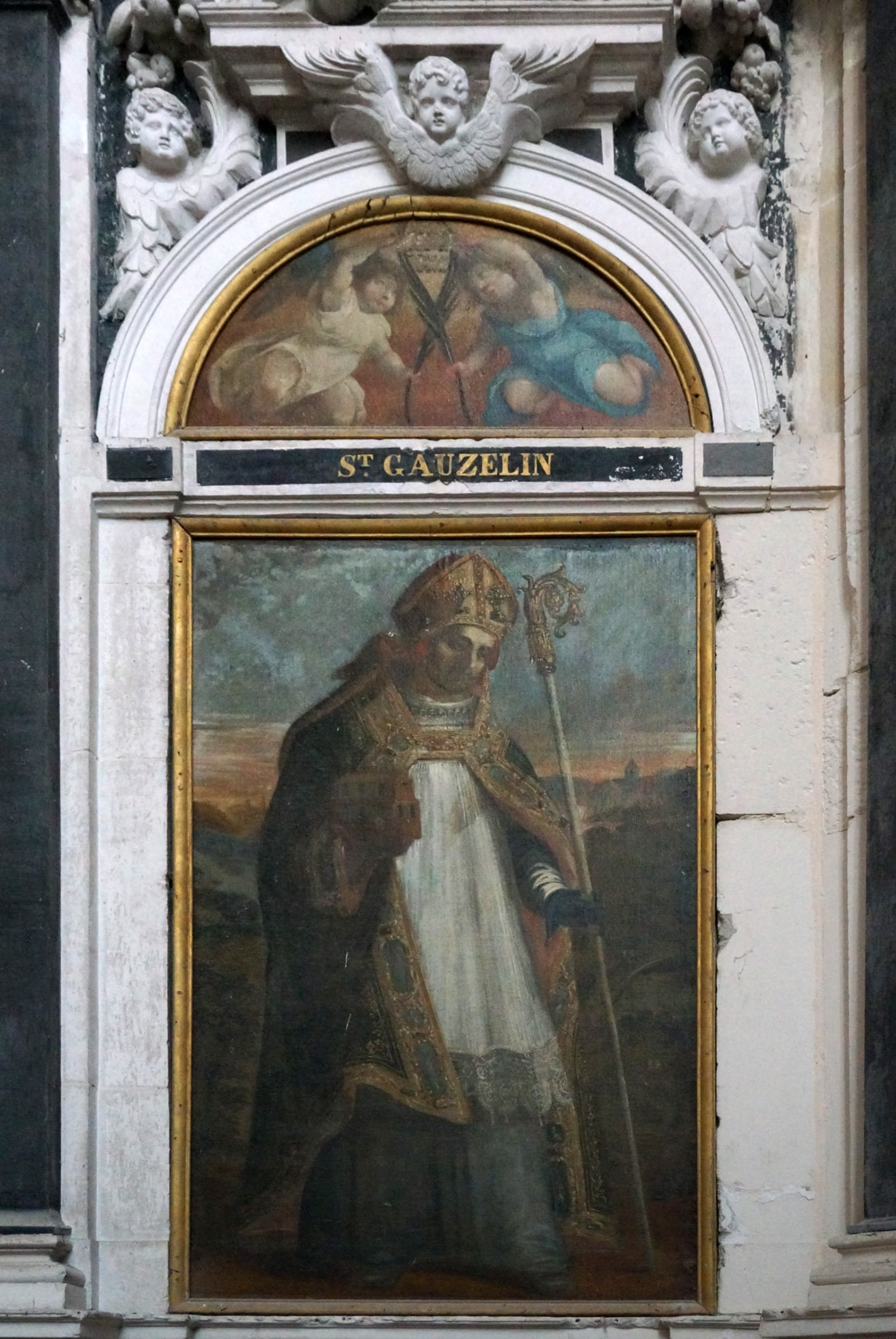
- Church: Catholic Church in France
- Diocese: Toul
- See: Toul
- Appointed: 922
- Term ended: 7 September 962
- Predecessor: Drogo
- Successor: Gérard

Orders
- Consecration: 17 March 922 by Ruotger
- Rank: Bishop

Personal details
- Born: Gauzelin
- Died: 7 September 962 Toul, Kingdom of France
- Buried: Bouxières-aux-Dames, France

Sainthood
- Feast day: 7 September
- Venerated in: Catholic Church, Eastern Orthodox Church

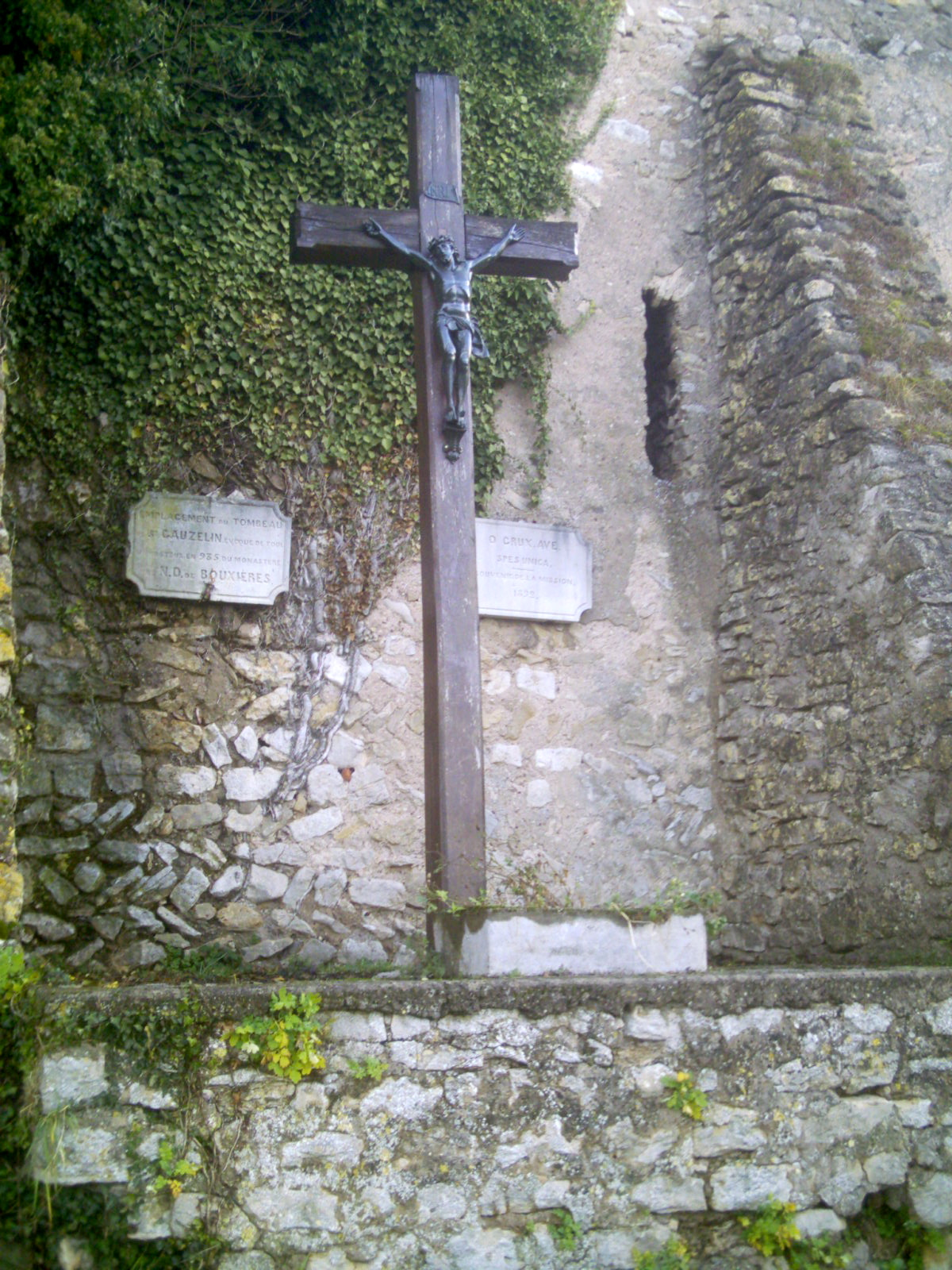
Tomb in Bouxières-aux-Dames.

Gauzelin (died 7 September 962) was a French Roman Catholic prelate who served as the Bishop of Toul from 922 until his death. He has been named as a saint.

== Life ==
Gauzelin was born to noble Frankish parents. He first served as part of notaries in the French kingdom from 913 to circa 919 which later led to King Charles naming him as the Bishop of Toul; Pope John X confirmed the appointment and he received his episcopal consecration on 17 March 922 from Ruotger. Gauzelin promoted discipline for the monasteries and for diocesan priests and tried to defend the church against secular threats.

The damage from the Danish and Hungarian invasions saw him become a reforming bishop in his diocese as well as the founder of a number of monasteries. These new monasteries included one at Bouxières-aux-Dames (built c. 935–936) which became associated with his noble household and where he was later buried.

== Death ==
Bishop Gauzelin died on 7 September 962. There is a cathedral that continues to preserve a number of objects associated with him.

== Feast days ==
- 7 September - main commemoration,
- 31 August - translation of relics to Nancy Cathedral in 1803,

== Sources ==
- Michel, Jacqueline; Parisse, Michel (1972). Gauzelin, évêque de Toul (922-962) (in French).
- Martin, Eugène (1893). Quelques observations des évéques de Toul prédécesseurs de Saint-Gauzelin (in French). Nancy: Impr. de Vagner.
- Parisse, Michel. Un évêque réformateur : Gauzelin de Toul (922-962) (in French). Ad libros !.
- Nightingale, John (2001). A New Foundation and its Donors: Bouxières-aux-Dames. Monasteries and Patrons in the Gorze Reform.
