= Auspicius of Toul =

Bishop of Toul and Catholic saint

Auspicius of Toul (Latin: Auspicius Tullensis; French: Auspice de Toul; d.c.490?) was a 5th-century bishop of Toul, the fifth of those recorded, and a saint of the Roman Catholic church. He was also a poet, known for iambic verse based on stress (rather than quantity, as in the classical Latin prosody); this was an innovation of his time. A verse letter of his from around 470 to Arbogast, count of Trier, survives.

== Life ==
Bishop Auspicius was part of the Gallo-Roman aristocracy, also counting the Roman general of Frankish descent, Arbogast, famous under Theodosius the Great, among his ancestors. He was probably born in the early part of the 5th century, and succeeded Gelsimus as bishop of Toul around 478. After more than 500 years in the Roman Empire, the city of Toul (capital of the Leuci) had fallen under the power of Francia, and Auspicius was thus the first of the bishops of Toul to serve under the Franks.

Sidonius died around 485, and it is likely that Auspicius died a few years later (perhaps about 490). His successor was the bishop Saint Ours. He was buried in the burial ground of St. Mansuy.

== Writings ==
His rare talents and virtues gained him the esteem of distinguished person of his time. He was a friend of the poet Sidonius Apollinaris, bishop of Clermont, and of Count Arbogast, the governor of Trier for Childeric I, and the three exchanged correspondence.

Arbogast wrote to Sidonius asking him to instruct him in his duties and to give some explanation of the sacred books but Sidonius apologized and referred him to Saint Loup, Bishop of Troyes, or to Auspicius, bishop of Toul, both distinguished by their deep knowledge and high rank. The Count approached Auspicius, who sent him a highly complimentary reply in verse. The letter was written sometime created between 460 and 475. In it Auspicius praised Arbogast because of his Latin language skills. He also hinted at the end of Roman rule. " ... as long as you live and speak, though the Latin rule has fallen on the frontier, the (Latin) words do not waver. " He praised the high descent and noble disposition of the prince. He was greater than his ancestor of the same name, because he died as a pagan, but Arbogast was Christian. He also warns him against greed. Confident that Arbogast takes this to heart, Auspicius saw him as a future bishop. In fact, he may have possibly later become Bishop of Chartres. Finally, he exhorts him to meet Bishop Jamblichus of Trier.

The text is written in poem form of 164 iambic dimeters. He is considered an early example of rhythmic anthemstrophy, in the word accent prevails. As a poet, he was the first Westerner to adopt the iambic rhythm derived from the Saturnian metre, the preferred metre of Roman folk and secular poetry. The poem is preserved in a collection of various writings written or sent in Austrasia, which was compiled in 585. The only surviving manuscript is Cod. Vaticano-Palatinus 869 s.IX

== Veneration ==
The breviary of the diocese of Toul has always given him the title of Saint Auspicius. In the Roman Martyrology his feast day is July 8.
