= Mansuetus (bishop of Toul) =

Catholic bishop of Toul (fl 365 - 375)

- Bishop of Toul
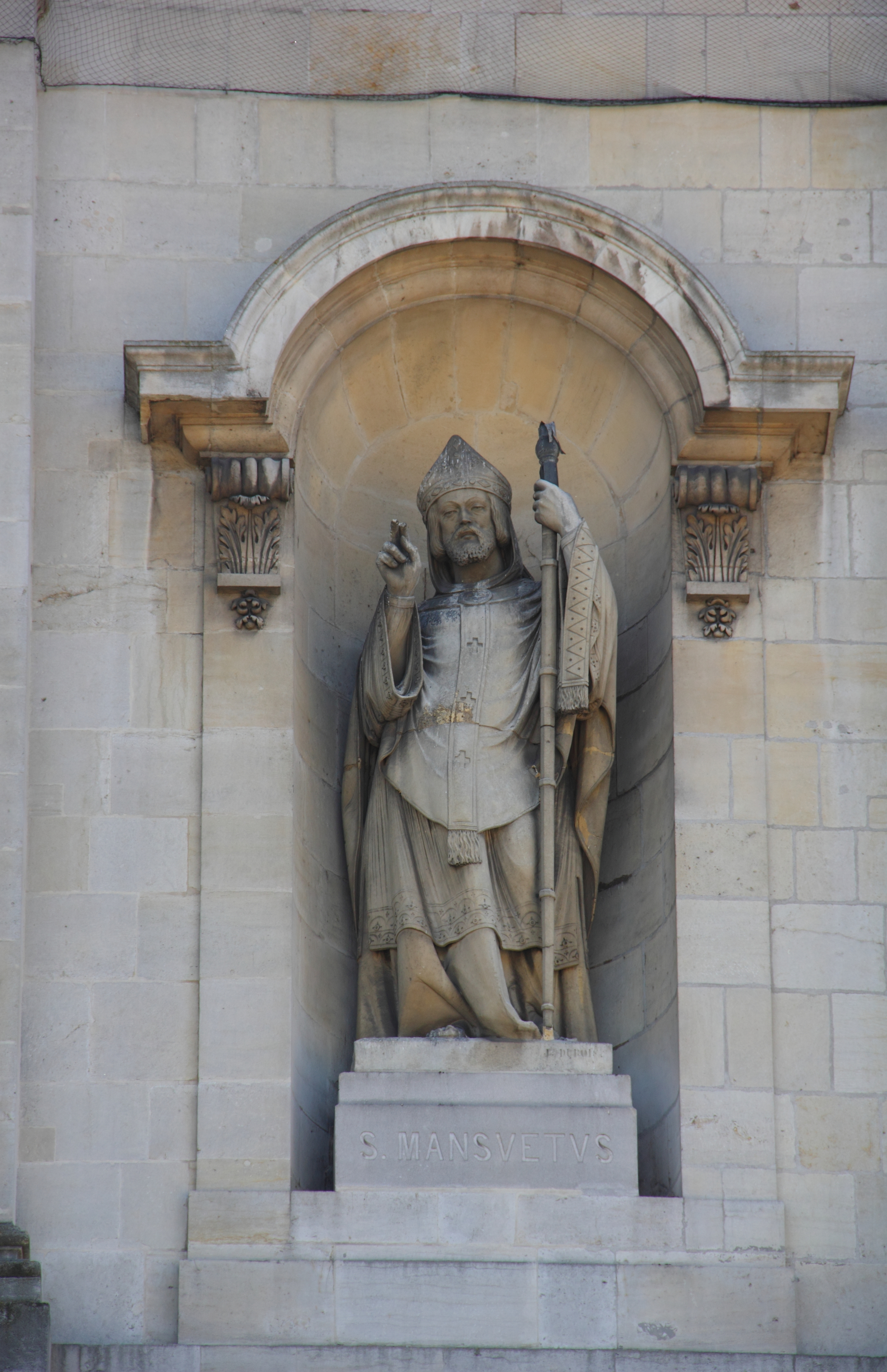
- Church: Catholic Church
- Appointed: 365
- Term ended: 375
- Successor: Amon

Sainthood
- Feast day: September 3
- Venerated in: Catholic Church

Saint Mansuetus (French: Mansuy; died 375) was the first Bishop of Toul.

== Life ==
Mansuetus is thought to have been of Irish or Scottish origin. After religious studies in Rome, he was sent by Pope Damasus I to evangelize Gaul, becoming the first Bishop of Toul in 365.

Mansuetus built in the woods a dwelling of interwoven twigs, where he spent his days in prayer and meditation. Near this he raised an oratory dedicated to St. Peter. It was believed that he had the gift of healing. Tradition holds that he was responsible for the healing of lepers and for restoring the life of the drowned son of the prince of Toul.

He erected two churches in Toul: one in honor of St. John the Baptist, and the other dedicated to the Blessed Virgin and Saint Stephen. The latter became the cathedral, later rebuilt by Gerard of Toul. Mansuetus spent nearly four decades preaching in the Leuci region, which efforts were met with considerable success. He is regarded as the "Apostle of Lorraine". According to most accounts, he died on 3 September 375. He was initially buried in the oratory of St. Peter, which became a site of pilgrimage. It is said, Martin of Tours visited the shrine.

== Veneration ==
Mansuetus is recognized as a saint according to the Pre-Congregation standards for canonization. His Feast day is celebrated on September 3 in the Roman Catholic Diocese of Toul and on August 31 in Saint-Dié.

Various versions of St Mansuy's life were composed in the Middle Ages, the earliest was written by Adso of Montier-en-Der at the request of Gerard of Toul in the mid tenth-century. In the eleventh and twelfth centuries a shorter version and a metrical version were written.

According to the Vita Sancti Gerardi, Bishop St. Gerard I of Toul (r. 963–994) had the relics of both Mansuetus and Aprus brought into Toul and placed in the church of St. John the Baptist while he was ill. Later, in 1790, Mansuetus' relics were divided among the canons of the church of Toul, to prevent them from being destroyed by revolutionaries.

== Gallery ==
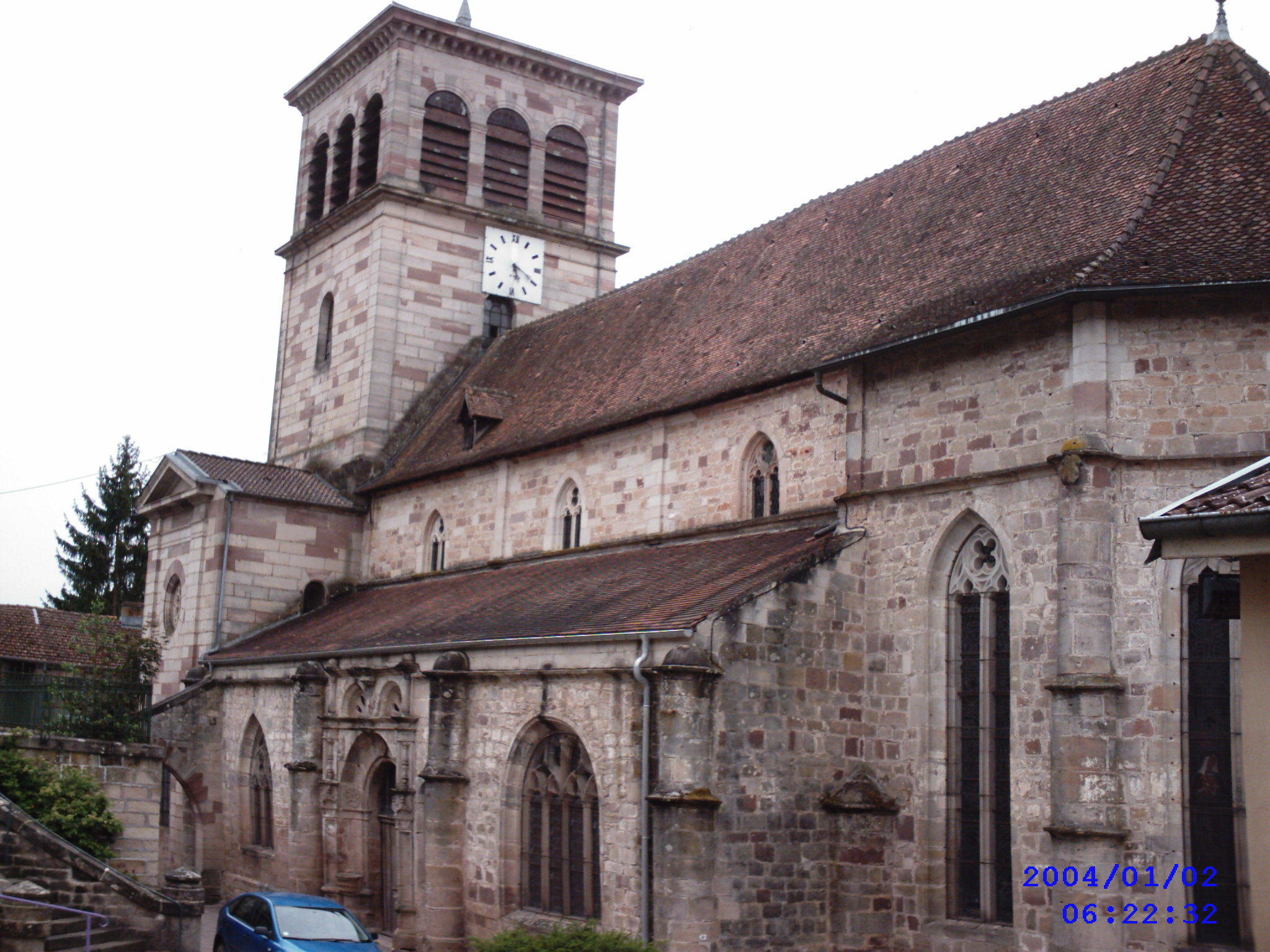
Église Saint Mansuy de Fontenoy-le-Château.

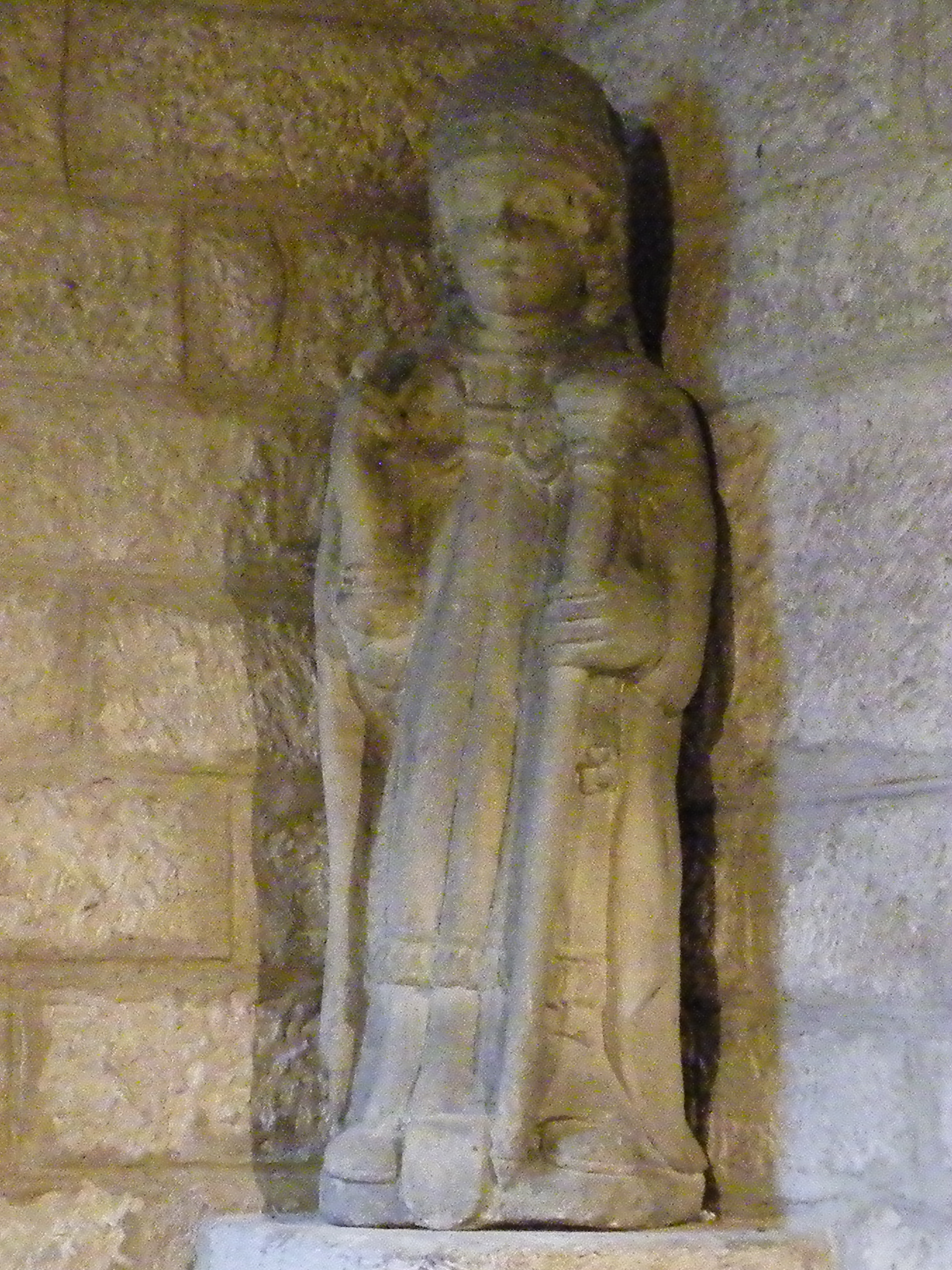
Statue.

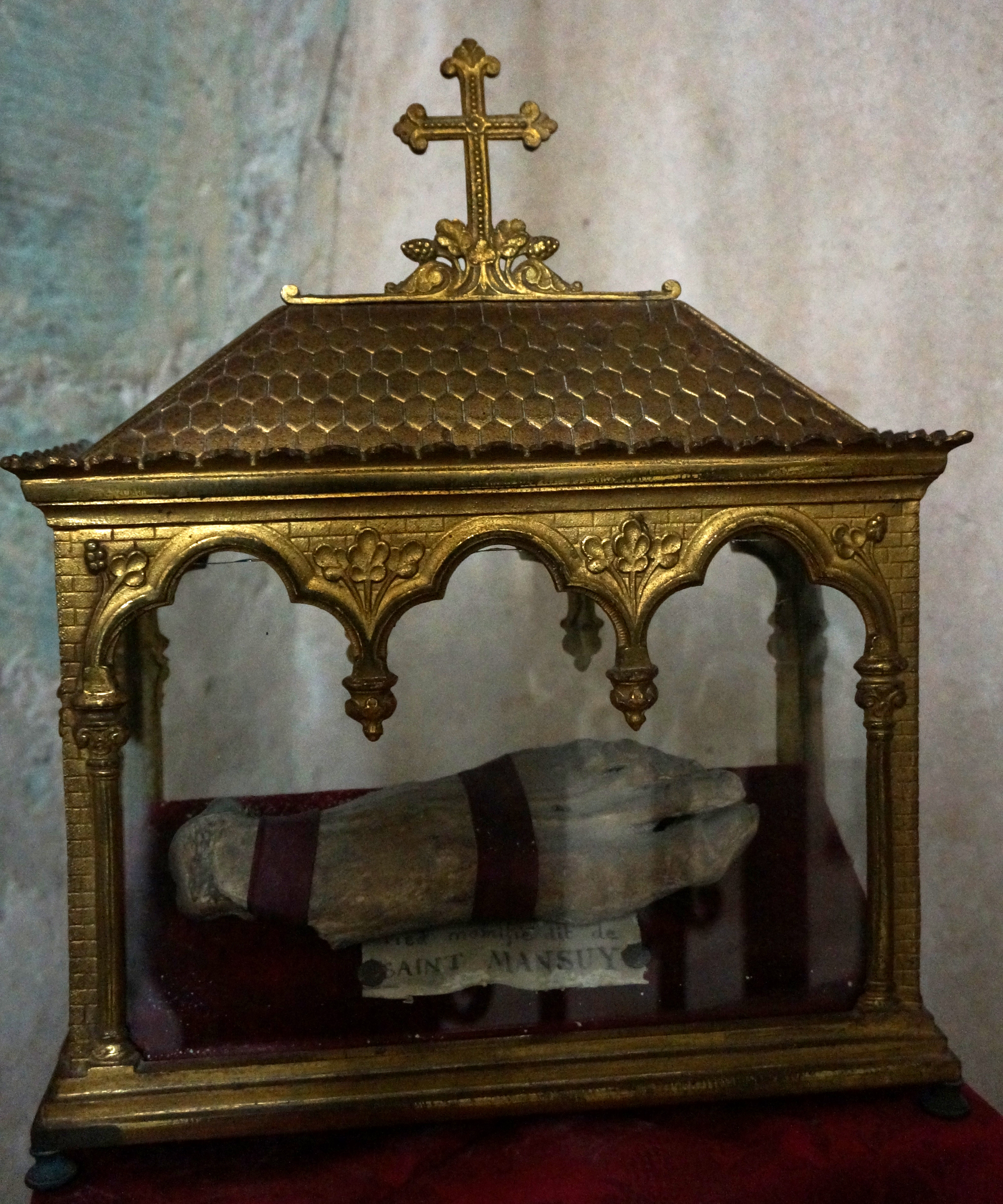
Reliquary.

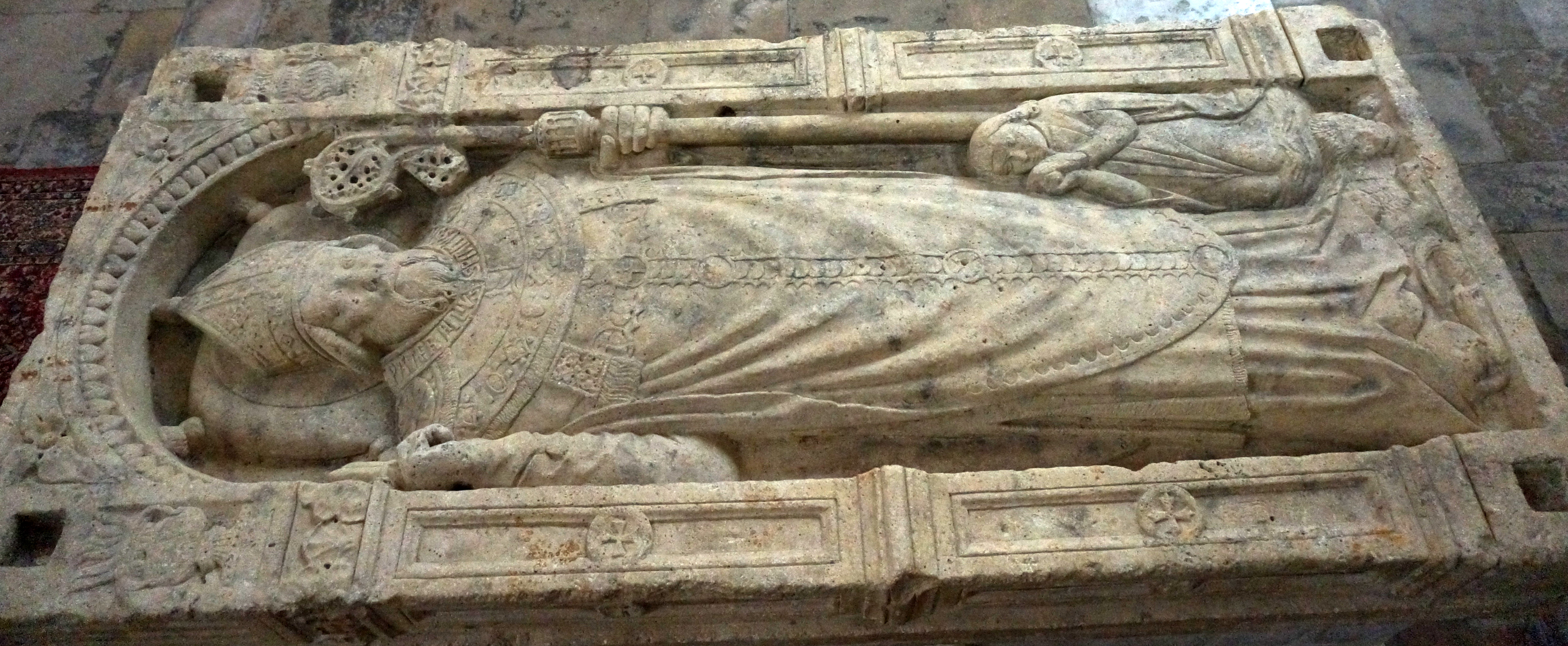
Funeral statue.

Iconography is found on the shrine of Vittel and a brotherhood statue, belonging to the Church of Fontenoy-le-Château. There are parish churches dedicated to St. Mansuy in Bouvron, Fontenoy-le-Château, Loisey-Culey, Nancy, Serécourt. The village of Dommary-Baroncourt had a church of that name, but it was destroyed in 1974.
