= Toul Cathedral =

Cathedral located in Meurthe-et-Moselle, in France

Coordinates: 48°40′31″N 5°53′40″E

- Cathédrale Saint-Étienne de Toul
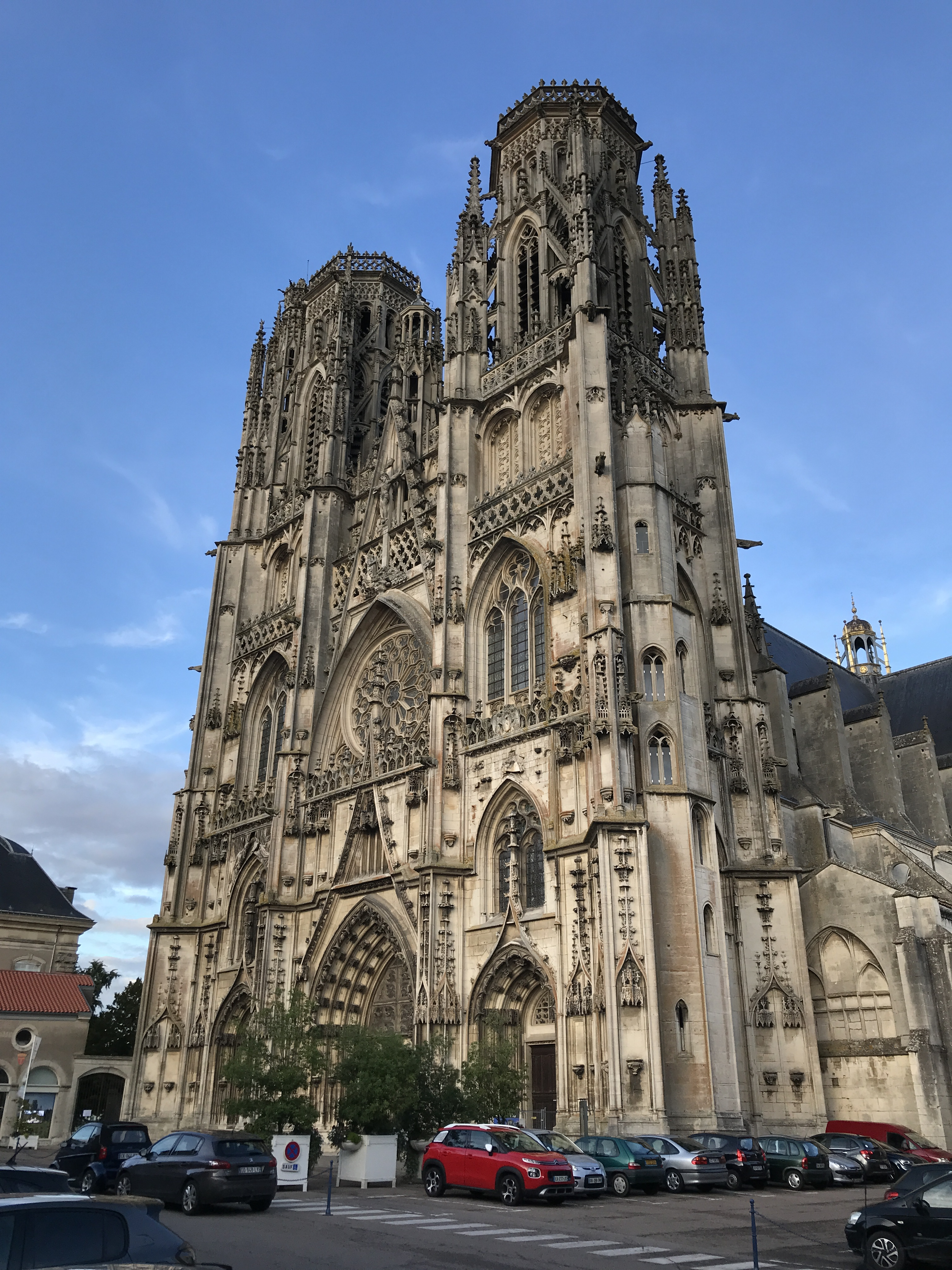
- Toul Cathedral in 2023
- Toul Cathedral
- Location: Toul, France
- Denomination: Roman Catholic Church
- Churchmanship: Roman

History
- Status: Cathedral

Architecture
- Functional status: Active
- Architectural type: church
- Style: Gothic, Flamboyant (Late Gothic), Renaissance
- Groundbreaking: 1278; 748 years ago
- Completed: 1496; 530 years ago

Administration
- Province: Diocese of Toul

Monument historique
- Official name: Cathédrale Saint-Étienne de Toul
- Type: Classé
- Designated: 1840
- Reference no.: PA00106371

Toul Cathedral or Cathedral of Saint Stephen of Toul (French: Cathédrale Saint-Étienne de Toul) is a Roman Catholic cathedral in Toul, Lorraine, France. It is a classic example of Flamboyant Gothic architecture and is notable for having the second largest cloister in France. The cathedral was formerly the seat of the Diocese of Toul and has been known as the Diocese of Nancy-Toul since 1824. The church has also been an important stop on the pilgrimage route to Santiago de Compostela since the Middle Ages.

== History ==
The earliest origins of the cathedral date to the 4th century AD, several hundred years after the annexation of Gaul by the Roman Republic, and after its reincorporation into the unified Roman Empire under the Emperor Aurelian in 274 AD. During the Roman period, the site hosted a temple on the banks of the Moselle River, and after the fall of the Empire to the Franks, was replaced by three Romanesque churches, dedicated to the Virgin Mary, Saint Stephen, and Saint John the Baptist. Following a second rebuilding of the largest church, a third expansion between 963-981 merged the existing two structures into a single basilica, consecrated first in 981 by Gerard of Toul, then later by Pope Eugene III in 1147.

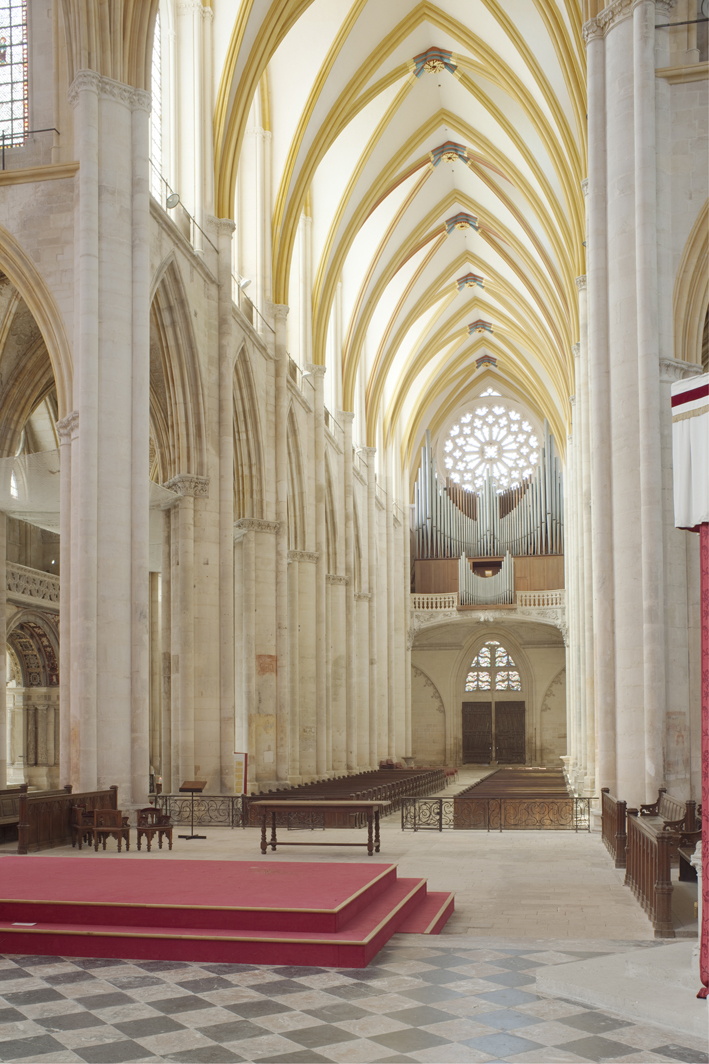
Interior of the cathedral

Construction on the current Gothic cathedral started in 1221, intending to rival nearby Metz Cathedral. The cathedral's plan was influenced by the Champagne Gothic style of Reims Cathedral while retaining the original Ottonian church layout of the Holy Roman Empire. The seven-sided choir was completed as early as 1235, and by 1240, construction on the cloister commenced, along with the addition of capitular stalls being installed around the tomb of Saint Gerard. In the second half of the 13th century, construction advanced to the transept, a sculpted porch, the eastern gallery of the cloister, and the demolition of the older Romanesque nave for a rib vaulted ceiling. Construction paused for nearly half a century due to a war between the Duke of Burgundy and the Duke of Lorraine, resuming around 1460. Additional work continued steadily into the 15th century in the Flamboyant Gothic style, when the façade, towers, and the first two bays of the nave were built, although the building was essentially considered complete by 1496.

During the Renaissance, the cathedral was topped with the so-called "Golden Ball" dome at the crossing of the transept roof and the construction of two bell towers surmounting the apse towers, aligning with the growing trend of the departure of Gothic architecture. New chapels were also added to the north and south aisles during the 16th century, including the Chapel of All Saints which served as the burial place for Jean Forget, a cantor and chaplain of the chapter.

During the late 18th century, the cathedral suffered vandalism from the French Revolution, including the destruction of the sculpted figures on its western façade as revolutionary forces closed the church and repurposed it as a Temple of Reason. By municipal decree, the statues that adorned the niches of the portals, rood screen, choir stalls, and ornaments were removed, along with the golden ball dome and 13th-century stained-glass windows of the choir apse in 1836. During World War II, the cathedral suffered severe damage when a 210mm German artillery shell penetrated the nave, causing a fire that destroyed the roof, organ, and rose window. A temporary cover was erected above the open roof, and services continued until 1978, when the structure was deemed unsafe. A major restoration campaign began in 1981, with the reconstruction of the high roof structure. Exterior restoration continued until 1995.

== Architecture ==
=== Exterior ===
The cathedral is notable for its significant elements of the late Gothic Flamboyant and Renaissance styles of architecture. The transept of Toul Cathedral features large Flamboyant Gothic windows, measuring up to 22 metres (72 ft) in height and 8 metres (26 ft) in width, which span nearly the full height of the walls. These quadripartite bays, among the earliest and most expansive of their type, represent a key innovation in regional Gothic design, influencing subsequent fenestration in nearby structures. Generally the cathedral structural style is considered to be a combination of the influence of the Verdun Cathedral choir for the design of crypt, and the towers and facade by Reims. The decoration of the towers of the cathedral is also likely inspired by those of the Church of St. Martin de Pont-à-Mousson.

=== Interior ===
The interior of the cathedral features a reconstructed soaring ribbed vault ceiling and transept which embraces large stained glass windows over the entire height of the transept wall. This glass wall effect is later seen in the western facade of Metz Cathedral and also in the reconstruction of the transept of the Basilica of St. Vincent de Metz. The first installation of the great organ on the north transept dates to 1356 under the episcopacy of Bishop Bertrand de la Tour d'Auvergne. Rebuilt twice during the 15th and 18th centuries, it was destroyed by fire during World War II and rebuilt in 2016.

=== Cloister ===
Construction of the cloister began around 1240, starting with the east gallery, built in a Rayonnant Gothic style with large, simple, open windows. Water was drained from gargoyles through gutters, an advanced system at the time which was studied by Eugène Viollet-le-Duc. In the 14th century, the chapter house was created in the north gallery, adjoining the nave of the cathedral and enclosed by a vast stained-glass window opening onto the garden. It is considered to be one of the largest Gothic cloisters in France, with the east gallery measuring 65 meters and comprising ten bays, from the cloister's outer entrance to the portal leading into the cathedral; the south gallery measuring 40 meters and pierced by six bays; and the west gallery measuring 52 meters and comprising eight bays. The cloister was built to the scale of one of the largest bishoprics in Western Christendom during the Middle Ages, and to the size of a cathedral chapter.

== Gallery ==
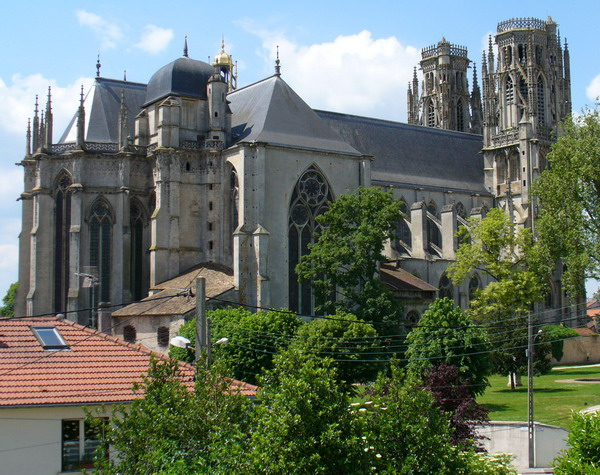
Toul Cathedral

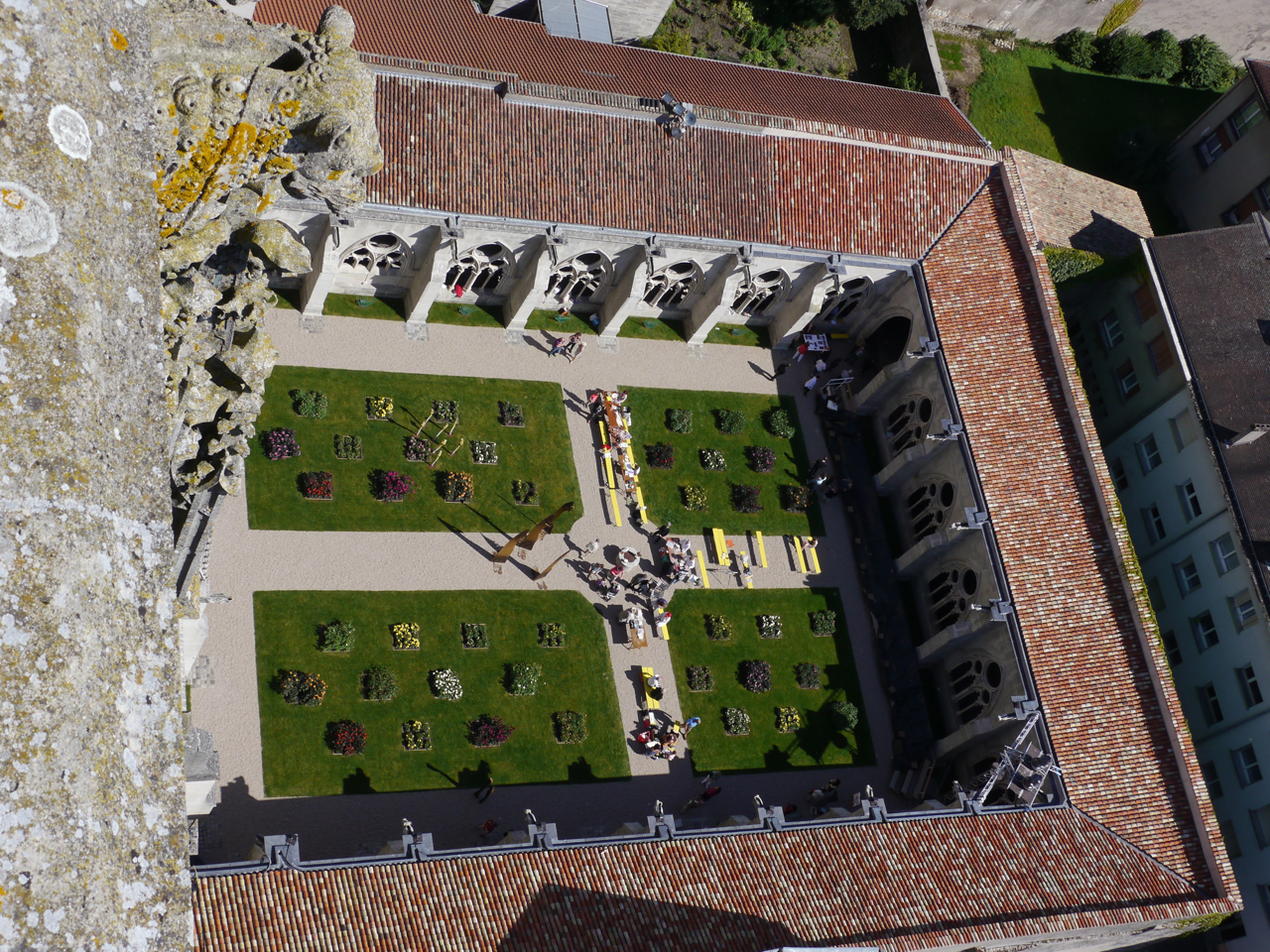
The cloisters

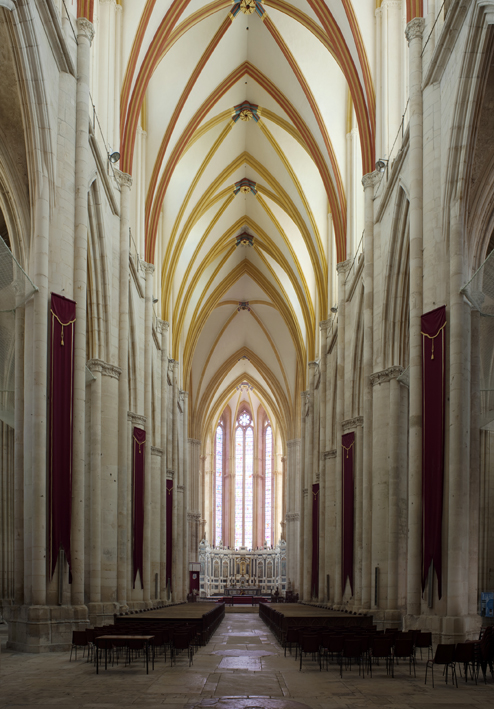
Nave

== See also ==
- Pierre Camille Le Moine
