= Diocese of Toul =

Former Roman Catholic diocese in present-day France

Coordinates: 48.68°N 5.89°E

Bishopric of Toul Fürstbistum Tull (German) Principauté épiscopale de Toul (French)
- Prince-bishopric of Holy Roman Empire
- 1048–1648
- Coat of arms

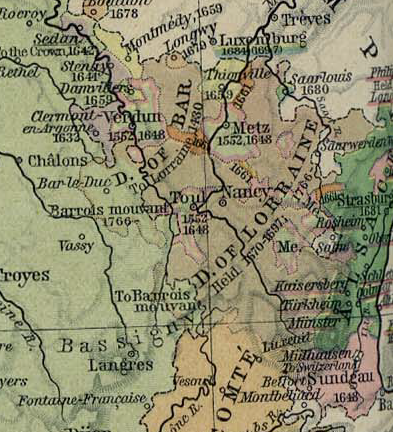
- The Three Bishoprics of Verdun, Metz and Toul
- Capital: Toul
  - Type: Ecclesiastical principality
- Historical era: Middle Ages
  - Bishopric established: 365
  - Acquired territory: 1048
  - Three Bishoprics annexed by France: 1552 1648
  - Treaty of Westphalia recognises annexation: 1648
Preceded by	Succeeded by
Duchy of Lorraine	Three Bishoprics

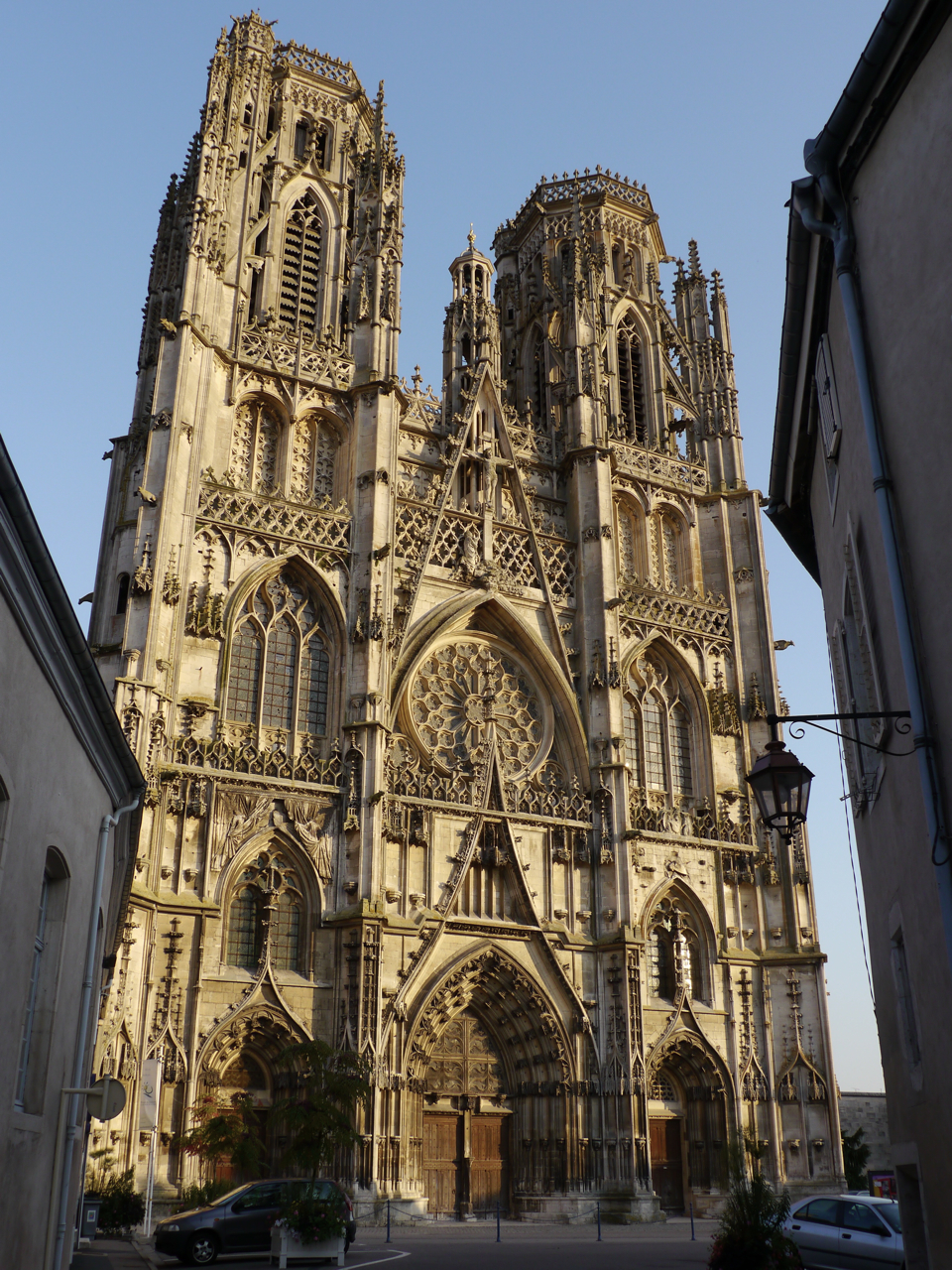
Toul Cathedral

The Diocese of Toul was a Roman Catholic diocese seated at Toul in present-day France. It existed from 365 until 1802. From 1048 until 1552 (de jure until 1648), it was also a state of the Holy Roman Empire.

== History ==
The diocese was erected in 338 AD by St. Mansuetus. The diocese was a suffragan of the ecclesiastical province of Trier. In 550 AD, the Frankish Council of Toul was held in the city.

By the high Middle Ages, the diocese was located at the western edge of the Holy Roman Empire; it was bordered by France, the Duchy of Bar, and the Duchy of Lorraine. In 1048 it become a state of the Empire while that city of Toul itself became a Free Imperial City.

In 1552, both states were annexed by King Henry II of France; the annexations were formally recognized by the Empire in 1648 by the Peace of Westphalia. By then, they were part of the French province of the Three Bishoprics.

In 1766, the Duchy of Lorraine became part of France. In 1777 and 1778, territory was carved out of Toul to form two new dioceses: Saint Dié and Nancy, both of them suffragans of Trier. By the terms of the Concordat of 1802, Toul was suppressed. Its territory was merged with that of Nancy to form a new diocese — the Diocese of Nancy-Toul with its seat in Nancy: after 1824 the bishops of Nancy have indeed borne the title of Bishops of Nancy and Toul, since nearly all of the territory of the ancient Diocese of Toul is united with that of Nancy.

The geographic remit included three Departments of France: Meurthe, Meuse, and Vosges but now the Diocese of Nancy-Toul includes only the department of Meurthe-et-Moselle.

== List of bishops and prince-bishops ==
=== Bishops ===
- Mansuetus 338–375, first bishop
- Amon c. 400?
- Alchas c. 423?
- Gelsimus c. 455?
- Auspicius c. 478?
- Ursus around 490
- Aprus (Aper) 500–507
- Aladius 508–525?
- Trifsorich 525–532
- Dulcitius 532?–549
- Alodius c. 549
- Premon
- Antimund
- Eudolius c. 602
- Theofred 640–653
- Bodo of Toul c. 660
- Eborinus around 664
- Leudinus 667?–669
- Adeotatus 679–680
- Ermentheus c. 690?
- Magnald c. 695?
- Dodo c. 705
- Griboald 706–739?
- Godo 739?–756
- Jakob 756–767
- Borno 775–794
- Wannich 794?–813
- Frotar 814–846
- Arnulf 847–871
- Arnald 872–894
- Ludhelm 895–905
- Drogo 907–922
- Gosselin 922–962
- Gerard I 963–994 (Saint Gerard)
- Stephen 994–995
- Robert 995–996
- Berthold 996–1019
- Herman 1020–1026

=== Prince-Bishops ===
- Bruno Egisheim-Dagsburg † (1026 - 12 February 1049; elected as Pope Leo IX, served until his death in 1054)
- Sede Vacant 1049-1051
- Odo 1052–1069
- Pippo 1070–1107
- Richwin of Commercy 1108–1126
- Henry I of Lorraine 1127-1167
- Peter of Brixey 1168–1192
- Odo of Vaudemont 1192–1197
- Matthias of Lorraine 1197–1206, † 1217
- Reinald of Chantilly 1210–1217
- Gerard II of Vaudemont 1218–1219
- Odo II of Sorcy 1219–1228
- Garin 1228–1230
- Roger of Marcey 1231–1251
- Giles of Sorcy 1253–1271
- Conrad II of Tübingen 1272–1296
- John I of Sierck 1296–1305
- Vito Venosa 1305–1306
- Odo III of Grançon 1306–1308
- Giacomo Ottone Colonna 1308–1309
- John II of Arzillières 1309–1320
- Amatus of Geneva 1320–1330
- Thomas of Bourlemont 1330–1353
- Bertrand de la Tour 1353–1361
- Pietro di la Barreria 1361–1363
- John III of Hoya 1363–1372
- John IV of Neufchatel 1373–1384, † 1398
- Savin de Floxence 1384–1398
- Philip II de la Ville-sur-Illon 1399–1409
- Henry II de la Ville-sur-Illom 1409–1436
- Louis de Haraucourt 1437–1449
- Guillaume Fillastre 1449–1460
- John V de Chevrot 1460
- Anthony I of Neufchatel 1461–1495
- Ulric of Blankenberg 1495–1506

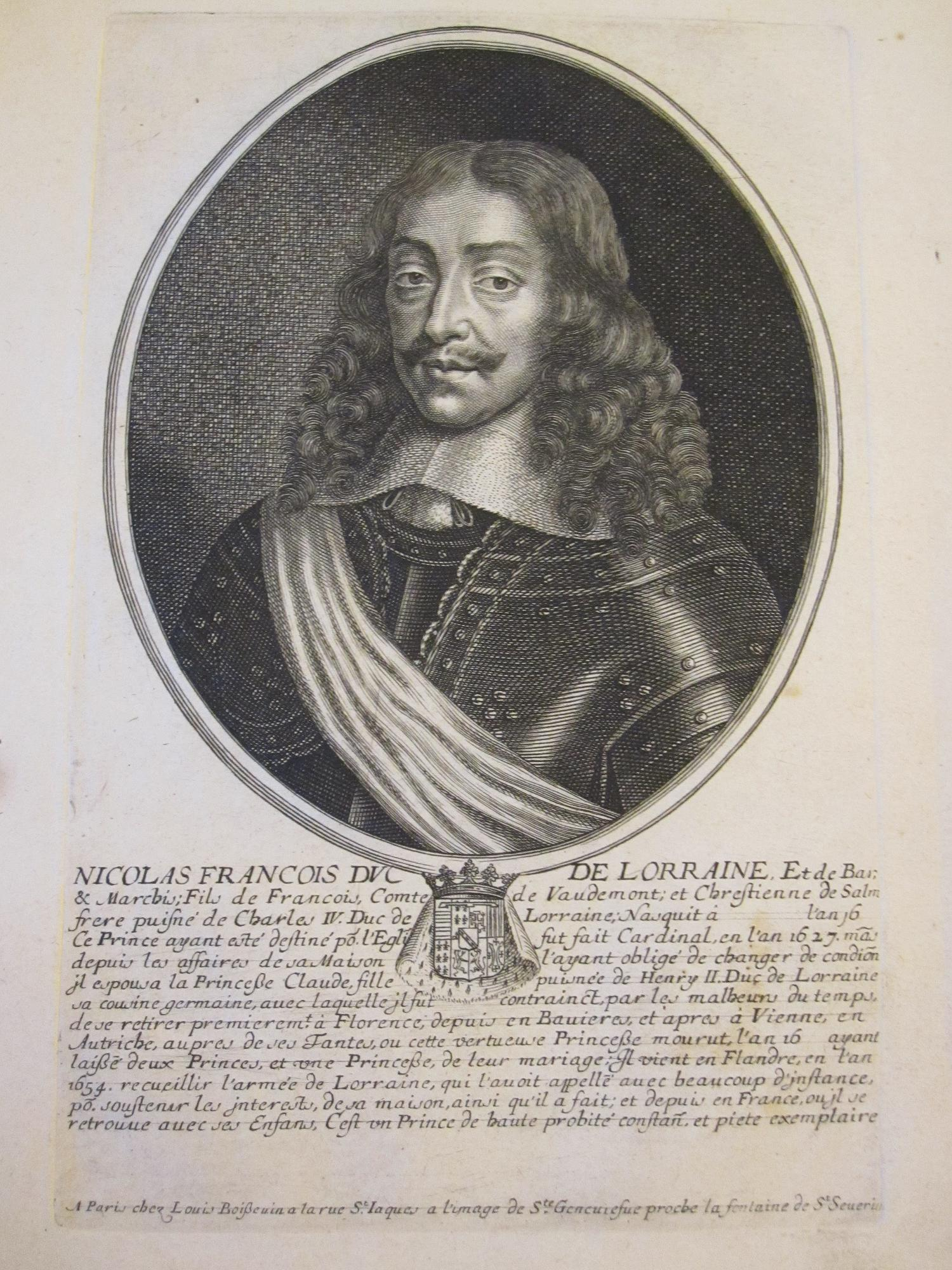
Nicholas Francis, cardinal, duke of Lorraine

- Hugh des Hazards 1506–1517
- John, Cardinal of Lorraine 1517–1524, † 1544 (Bishop of Verdun 1523–1544)
- Hector de Ailly-Rochefort 1526–1532
- John, Cardinal of Lorraine (again) 1532–1537
- Anthony II Pellagrin 1537–1542
- John of Lorraine-Guise (again) 1542–1543, † 1544

=== Bishops after the French annexation ===
- Toussaint de Hossey 1543–1565
- Peter III de Châtelet 1565–1580
- Charles de Lorraine de Vaudémont 1580–1587 (Bishop of Verdun 1585–1587)
- Christopher de la Vallée 1589–1607
- John VII Porcelet de Maillane 1609–1624
- Nicholas II, Duke of Lorraine 1625–1634
- Charles Christian de Gournay 1634–1637
- Henri Arnauld 1637-1643
- Paolo Fiesco 1643–1645
- Jacques Lebret 1645
- Henri-Pons de Thiard de Bissy 29 March 1687 to 10 May 1704 (Bishop of Meaux 1704–1737)
- François Blouet de Camilly 1706–1723
- Scipion-Jérôme Begon 1723–1753
- Claude Drouâs de Boussey 1754–1773
- Etienne-François-Xavier des Michels de Champorcin (Stephen-Francis-Xavier des Michels de Champorcin), last bishop, 1773–1802

Since 1824 the bishops of Nancy have borne the title of Bishops of Nancy and Toul, since nearly all of the territory of the ancient Diocese of Toul is united with that of Nancy.

== See also ==
- Catholic Church in France
- List of Catholic dioceses in France

== Bibliography ==
=== Reference Sources ===
- Gams, Pius Bonifatius (1873). Series episcoporum Ecclesiae catholicae: quotquot innotuerunt a beato Petro apostolo. Ratisbon: Typis et Sumptibus Georgii Josephi Manz. pp. 548–549. (Use with caution; obsolete)
- Eubel, Conradus, ed. (1913). Hierarchia catholica, Tomus 1 (second ed.). Münster: Libreria Regensbergiana. p. 301. (in Latin)
- Eubel, Conradus, ed. (1914). Hierarchia catholica, Tomus 2 (second ed.). Münster: Libreria Regensbergiana. p. 175.
- Eubel, Conradus, ed. (1923). Hierarchia catholica, Tomus 3 (second ed.). Münster: Libreria Regensbergiana.
- Gauchat, Patritius (Patrice) (1935). Hierarchia catholica IV (1592-1667). Münster: Libraria Regensbergiana. p. 219.
- Ritzler, Remigius; Sefrin, Pirminus (1952). Hierarchia catholica medii et recentis aevi V (1667-1730). Patavii: Messagero di S. Antonio.

=== Studies ===
- Jean, Armand (1891). Les évêques et les archevêques de France depuis 1682 jusqu'à 1801 (in French). Paris: A. Picard.
- Pisani, Paul (1907). Répertoire biographique de l'épiscopat constitutionnel (1791-1802) (in French). Paris: A. Picard et fils.
