= Gerard of Toul =

10th-century German bishop

Saint Gerard
- Bishop of Toul
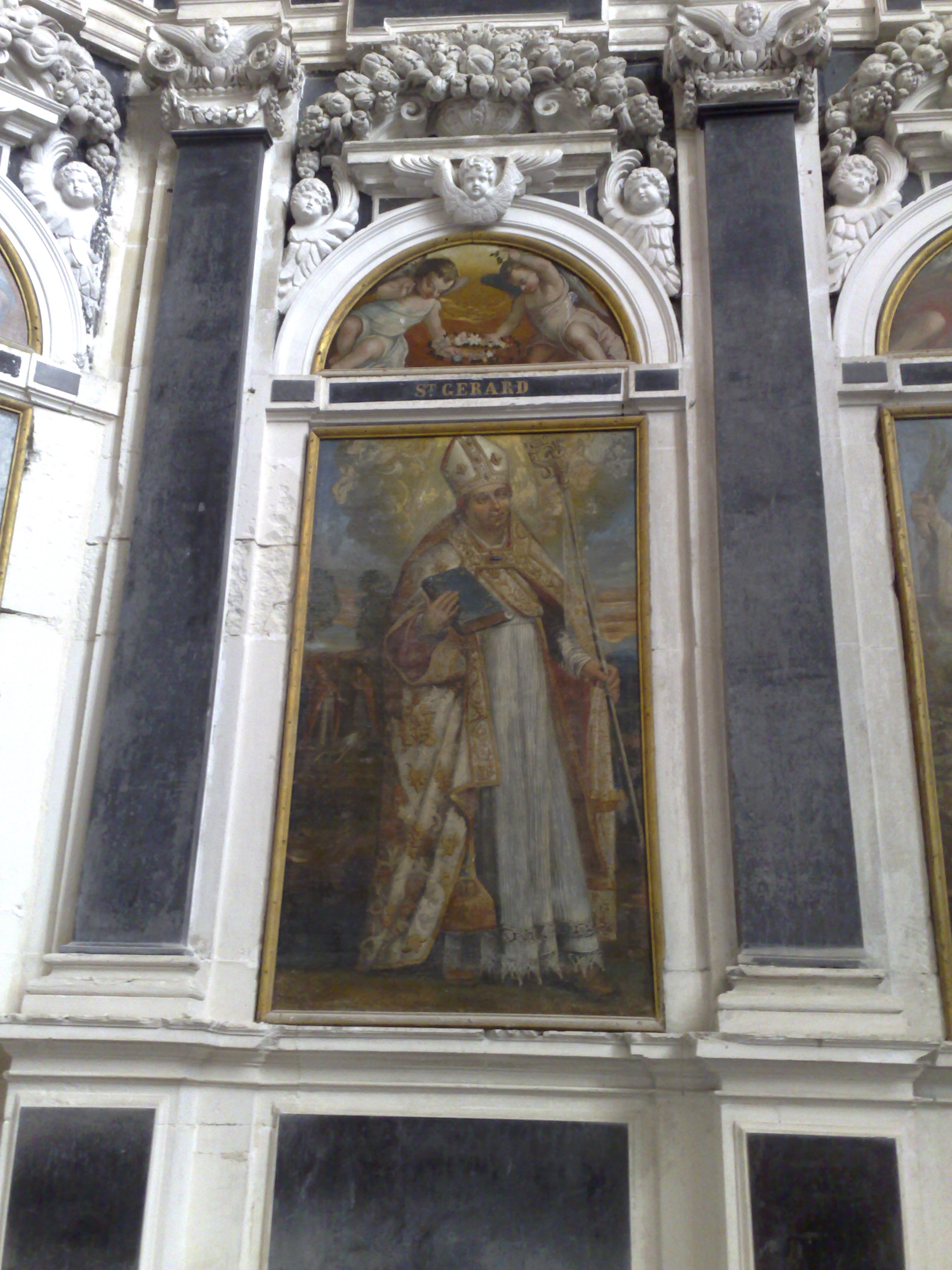
- Saint Gerard in Cathedral of Toul
- Church: Catholic Church; Eastern Orthodox Church
- Diocese: Toul
- See: Toul
- Appointed: 3 March 963
- Term ended: 23 April 994
- Predecessor: Gauzelin of Toul
- Successor: Étienne de Lunéville

Orders
- Consecration: 19 March 963 by Bruno the Great
- Rank: Bishop

Personal details
- Born: Gerard c. 935 Cologne, Kingdom of Germany
- Died: 23 April 994 (aged 58–59) Toul, Kingdom of France
- Buried: Toul Cathedral, Toul, France

Sainthood
- Feast day: 23 April
- Venerated in: Roman Catholic Church
- Canonized: 21 October 1050; Rome, Papal States by Pope Leo IX
- Attributes: Episcopal attire
- Patronage: Toul; Gérardmer

Gerard (French: Geraud; German Gerhard; c. 935 – 23 April 994) was a German prelate who served as the Bishop of Toul from 963 until his death. His entrance into the priesthood came about due to his mother being struck dead in a lightning strike which he believed was divine judgment for his sins and a call to service. But he had been known for his piousness and he accepted the position to the Toul diocese despite his reluctance. His concern as a bishop was to the restoration of all properties the Church managed and to ensure secular involvement in Church affairs ceased.

His reputation for holiness was evident in his life and miracles at his tomb were recorded after his death; Pope Leo IX – a successor in Toul – later canonized him on 21 October 1050 in Rome.

== Life ==
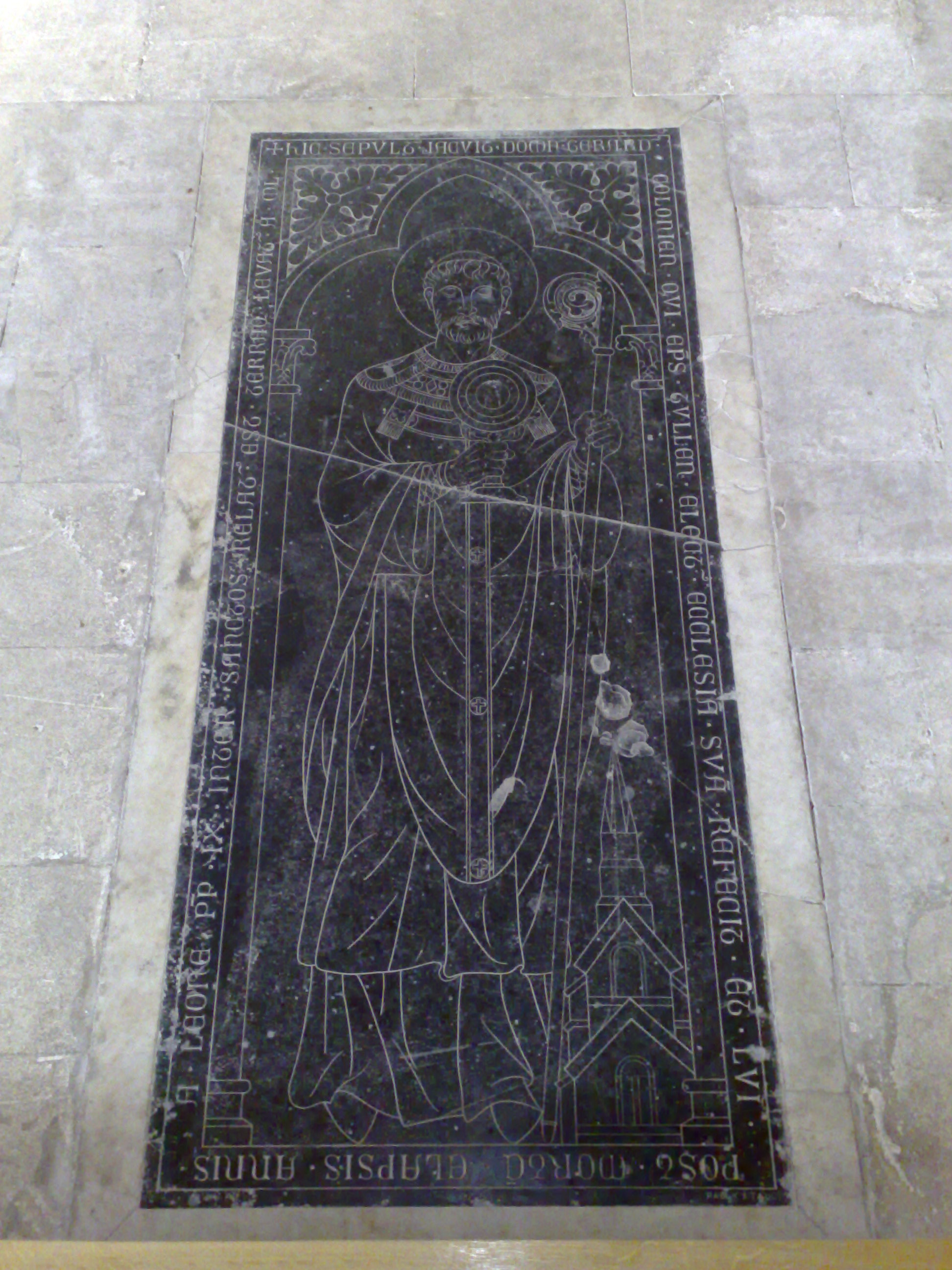
Tomb in the Toul Cathedral.

Gerard was born circa 935 in Cologne to the nobles Ingranne and Emma and was known for his piousness and he was educated in Cologne. It is believed that he entered the priesthood after lightning struck his mother and killed her which he believed to be divine judgment for his sins. Upon his ordination he became the canon for the Cologne Cathedral.

It was at this time that Toul had great independence under its bishops and Gerard himself proved to be quite successful and a respected leader after he was appointed as the Bishop of Toul (3 March 963) and consecrated (the following 19 March in Trier) as such. Bruno the Great – on the behalf of Pope John XII – appointed him to the Toul diocese He established religious schools in the diocese and he invited European scholars – more so Greeks – to come and teach at the school as well as learn there themselves. He rebuilt churches and the notable example to this is the Toul Cathedral which he himself consecrated in 981. Gerard also founded a convent for nuns. Gerard avoided meeting with Emperor Otto II who desired to have the bishop close to him as an advisor.

The "'Vita Sancti Gerardi" states that he had the relics of both Saint Mansuetus and Saint Aprus – earlier bishops of the diocese – brought and placed in the church of Saint John the Baptist while he was ill. He is said to have come up with the use of goutweed (once known as "herb Gerald") which was used in the Middle Ages to treat gout. Gerard also fought against secular intervention in ecclesial matters and also invited monks from Ireland to come to his schools to teach. He also studied Sacred Scripture and the lives and teachings of the saints.

He died during the night on 23 April 994 and was interred in the diocesan cathedral in the choir loft.

== Sainthood ==
His canonization was celebrated under Pope Leo IX in Rome on 21 October 1050 – that pontiff served as a successor in Toul and venerated the late bishop. Gerard's remains were exhumed in Leo IX's presence in Toul on the night of 20 October 1051 and he was found with his white hair to still be in good preservation.
