= Adso of Montier-en-Der =

French Benedictine abbot (910/920 – 992)

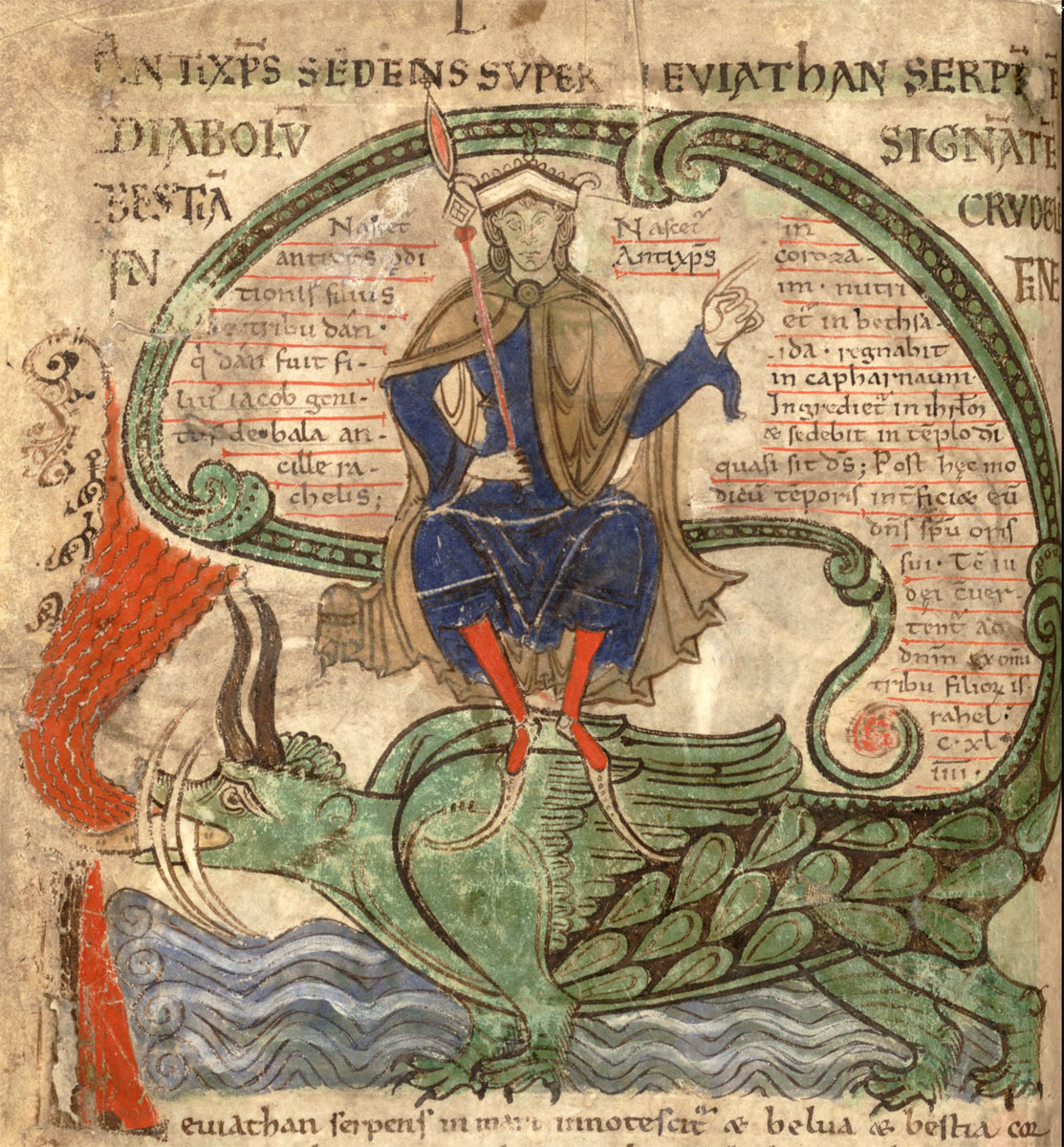
Antichrist seated above Leviathan; with his spear he points to a quote from Adso's De antichristo. Illustration from the Liber Floridus.

Adso of Montier-en-Der (Latin: Adso Dervensis; 910/920 – 992) was abbot of the Benedictine monastery of Montier-en-Der in France, and died on a pilgrimage to Jerusalem. Biographical information on Adso comes mainly from one single source and has come under question, but the traditional biography depicts him as an abbot who enacted important monastic reform, as a scholar, and as a writer of five hagiographies. His best-known work was a biography of Antichrist, titled "De ortu et tempore Antichristi", which combined exegetical and Sibylline lore. This letter became one of the best-known medieval descriptions of Antichrist, copied many times and of great influence on all later apocalyptic tradition, in part because, rather than as an exegesis of apocalyptic texts, he chose to describe Antichrist in the style of a hagiography.

== Biography ==
Biographical knowledge of Adso is limited to the comments made by a chronicler from his abbey, who wrote a half century after him; a successor of his under abbot Bruno finished Adso's final hagiography, on Bercharius, and in the process provided us with biographical detail. Supposedly born into a wealthy, noble family near Saint-Claude in the early 900s, he was educated at Luxeuil Abbey and became scholaster at Saint-Epvre near Toul. When his colleague Albéric was called from Saint-Epvre to become abbot at Montier-en-Der Abbey, Adso accompanied him there and was elected abbot on Albéric's death, around 968. When Hilduin II (brother of Manassès († 991), bishop of Troyes, who had committed many acts of violence) turned to him for penance, one of the things he imposed on him was a pilgrimage to Jerusalem. Following the example of Saint Bercharius, the patron saint of Montier-en-Der who had accompanied one of the murderers of Saint Leodegar to Jerusalem, he went with him but died at sea. He was buried on an island called Astilia, possibly identified as Astypalaia. Adso was charged with monastic reforms at St. Benignus' Abbey, Dijon, by Bruno of Roucy, which he enacted between 982 and 985.

Among his friends was Gerbert, abbot of Bobbio, afterwards Pope Sylvester II, and their correspondence indicates how Adso took great care in building a library. His collection was noteworthy: the detailed inventory lists (prepared by his monks after his departure, and preserved in an appendix to a copy of the Martyrology of Usuard) only three complete volumes of theology, and focused heavily on classical literature and commentary thereon.

The accepted biography, however, was questioned by a number of scholars since the late 20th century, with Daniel Verhelst, the most recent editor of the letter on Antichrist, being the first to doubt what is called the "long chronology", followed by Monique Goullet, editor of Adso's hagiographies. Its sourcing was already questionable, with one of the corroborating pieces of evidence a charter that was in fact used by the author of Adso's biographical sketch. This accepted account has Adso lead an extremely long life, going to Jerusalem sometime between age 72 and 82. But if his birth is placed close to 920, to have him on his pilgrimage as young as possible, he could hardly have been a teacher of renown in the 930s at Toul and either way it raises the question of why it took a scholar of such renown over 30 years to gain an abbacy. Another complicating factor is the Life of Clotilde, a hagiography of Clotilde possibly written for Gerberga of Saxony, the recipient of the letter on Antichrist, whose author is argued by a number of scholar to be identical with the author of the letter.

Goullet proposes a somewhat shortened biography, with Adso born in the 930s--which would mean that he would have written the letter possibly as a teenager. Simon Maclean proposes a radically different solution: in a nutshell, he suggests two Adsos ("Adso" being a very common name at the time)--the one, of Montier-en-Der, the author of the hagiographies; the other, Adso the abbot of St-Basle Abbey at Verzy (c. 970 – c. 991), whose epitaph was written by Adso of Montier-en-Der. Verzy is near Rheims, one of the most important locations in the sphere of influence of Gerberga, and a center of the monastic reform which she was interested in. This Adso, then, could be the author of the letter and of the Life of Clotilde.

== Works ==
The largest remaining part of Adso's literary output consists of hagiographies; he wrote the lives of five saints: Mansuetus, Frobert of Troyes, Waldebert, Basolus and Bercharius, and a short libellus on the translation of and miracles associated with Basolus. He also wrote hymns, and a rendering in verse of the second book of Dialogues (Pope Gregory I) (that second book is essentially a hagiography of St. Benedict), and the famous Epistola Adsonis ad Gerbergam reginam de ortu et tempore antichristi, frequently abbreviated De antichristo, a tract on the life and career of the Antichrist written as a letter to Gerberga of Saxony, the wife of Louis IV d'Outremer.

De antichristo was not an original work; it combined exegesis of biblical text with Sibylline (that is, oracular) accounts. The most important exegetical text was the commentary on 2 Thessalonians by Haimo of Auxerre, but Adso also used Jerome's De Antichristo in Danielem, and Alcuin's De Fide Sanctae et Individuae Trinitatis. The most important oracular one is the myth of the Last Emperor found in (Latin reworkings of the originally Syriac) Apocalypse of Pseudo-Methodius, besides the oracles of the Tiburtine Sibyl, though some scholars deny the latter as a source. Adso's true innovation (an argument proposed by Robert Konrad in 1964 and continued by Rihard Kenneth Emmerson in 1979) was the form in which he structured the material: he wrote it not in the form of a theological tract or exegetical commentary, which could have been organized by scriptural source, but rather as a hagiography, as a saint's life. Medieval hagiographies frequently used anti-types to bring out the virtuous characteristics of their protagonists, and Adso's setup of Antichrist as a chronologically organized biography allowed for an easy contrast with the life of Christ, and thus for easy access to a broad audience. The saintly biography is "a form easily understood and readily recognizable by every Christian", and his legend is an anti-legend.

The format did suit the times well, with its love of saintly biography: the biography of Antichrist became a standard entry in many saints' legends, including Jacobus de Voragine's Golden Legend, and it appears very frequently in vernacular legendaries, usually translated from the Libellus quote closely. In later editions of the letter, the prologue and the epilogue (which named Adso and Gerberga) were frequently cut off (which also makes it resemble a saint's life), and thus the letter was easily attributed to others including Rabanus Maurus, Alcuin, Jerome, and St. Augustine. Emmerson states there are most likely at least 76 versions in Latin between the 10th and 15th centuries. It is quoted by Ignaz von Döllinger among other writings of the medieval conception of Antichrist. It is printed in Corpus Christianorum Continuatio Mediaeualis vol 45, edited by D. Verhelst (Turnhout, 1976). The letter and Adso's hagiographies are found in Jacques Paul Migne (Patrologia Latina, CXXXVII, 597-700).

== Bibliography ==
- Dervensis, Adso (1976). Verhelst, Daniel (ed.). De ortu et tempore antichristi necnon et tractatus qui ab eo dependunt. Turnhout: Brepols.
- Dervensis, Adso (2003). Goullet, Monique (ed.). Adsonis Dervensis Opera hagiographica. Turnhout: Brepols.
