= Aprus of Toul =

Bishop of Toul

Saint Aprus of Toul
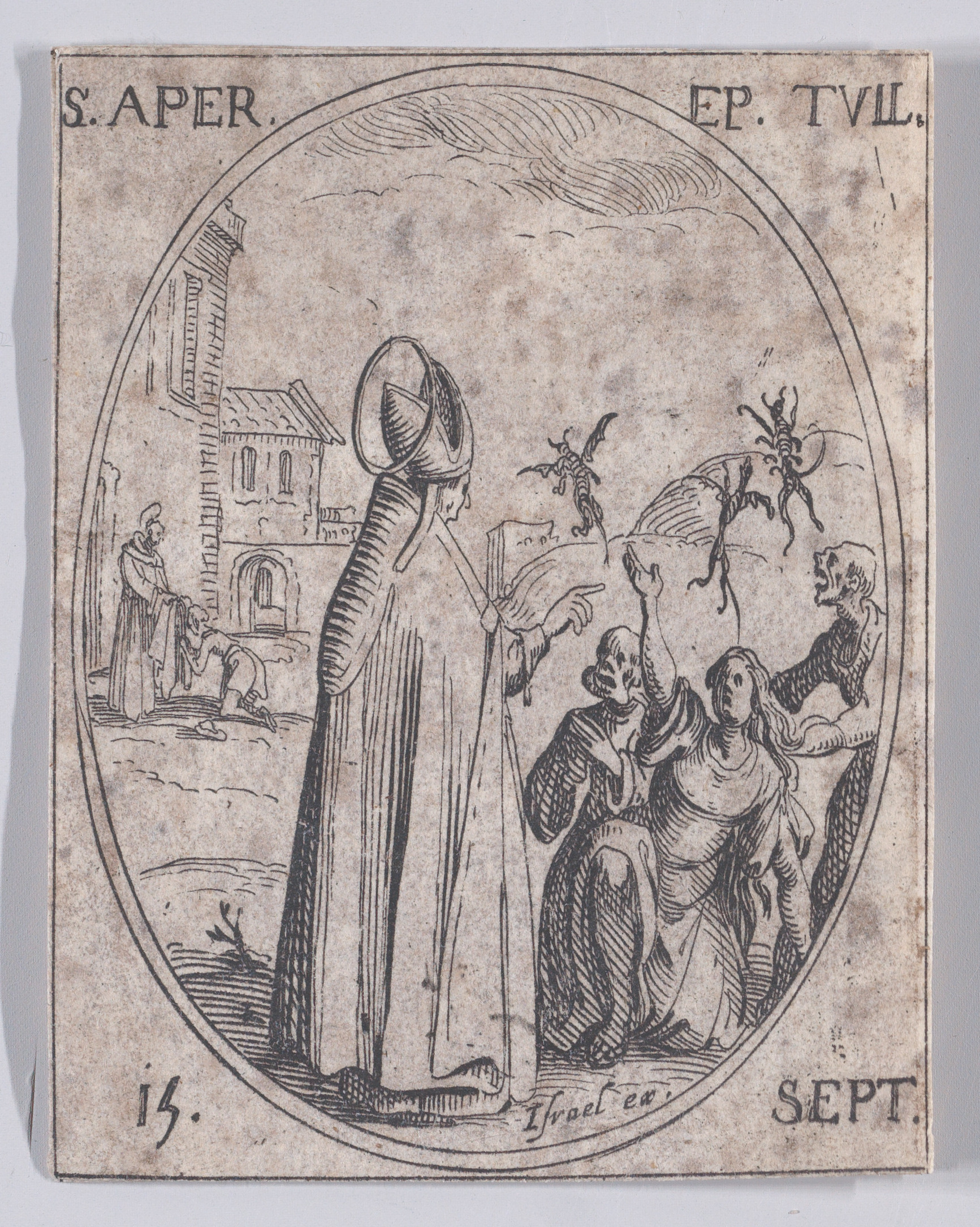
- Etching of St. Aper, Bishop of Toul by Jacques Callot

Bishop of Toul
- Born: 5th century Either Troyes or Trier
- Died: 15 September AD 507; Toul
- Venerated in: Roman Catholic Church; Eastern Orthodox Church
- Feast: September 15

Saint Aprus (or Aper, French: Apre, Epvre, Èvre, Avre; died 507) was the seventh bishop of Toul (r. 500–507). He has been considered a saint in Toul since the 10th century. His feast day is celebrated on 15 September.

== Life ==
The brother of Saint Apronia (Evronie), Saint Aprus was born near Trier. He may have studied as a lawyer.

According to his official hagiography, Aprus was born in Trancol near Troyes. Other popular variants state his birthplace as Trier, the center of the ecclesiastical province of Belgica prima. Whatever the venue, Troyes or Trier, he was a man of law, perhaps serving an advocate until he decided to become a priest. On the death of Bishop St. Ursus (Latin for bear), the faithful of Toul called for Aprus/Aper (Latin for wild boar) to become bishop. He was elected as bishop and his episcopate lasted for seven years.

Aper distributed all his goods to the poor and just lived in his diocese, admired and revered by his followers. Meanwhile, he fought strongly against the raging paganism in the countryside. He preached in particular in the city of Grand (Vosges), which was a centre of pagan pilgrimage, and still has important remains Gallo-Roman ruins.

== Burial ==
Aprus tried to commence the construction of a large church outside of Toul. It was to be dedicated to Saint Maurice, but he died before seeing this come to a pass. When he died, the people of the Toul interred his remains in that church under construction as per his will. A community of clerics in the eighth century watched over his church and sanctuary.

== Veneration ==
According to the hagiography, Aprus' final resting place is said to be the site of many miracles until the invasions of the 10th century. His relics remained preserved and hidden behind the walls of Toul. Many years later, these relics, which had reinstated the buildings of the Saint-Maurice church, were stolen by monks and rediscovered in 978 AD. According to the Vita Sancti Gerardi, Bishop St. Gerard I of Toul (r. 963–994) had the relics of both Saint Mansuy and Aprus brought into Toul and placed in the church of St. John the Baptist while he was ill.

In 1802, Bishop of La Fare, Bishop of Nancy, arranged the transfer of head of Aprus it installs in the eponymous church. This church was later destroyed. The windows of the monument that tell the life of the saint were destroyed during the 1914–18 war. The St Epvre Basilica was constructed in its place.

Today in Lorraine, forty churches bear the name of Aprus (Èvre) including:

- Domèvre-en-Haye en Meurthe-et-Moselle;
- Domèvre-sur-Vezouze en Meurthe-et-Moselle;
- Domèvre-sur-Avière dans les Vosges;
- Domèvre-sur-Durbion dans les Vosges;
- Domèvre-sous-Montfort dans les Vosges.
