= Agricultural Act =

Agricultural Act, the name of several United States federal laws, may refer to:

- Agricultural Act of 1949
- Agricultural Act of 1954
- Agricultural Act of 1956
- Agricultural Act of 1958
- Agricultural Act of 1961
- Agricultural Act of 1964
- Agricultural Act of 1970
- Agricultural Act of 2014
