= National Agricultural Law Center =

Research and information center

The National Agricultural Law Center
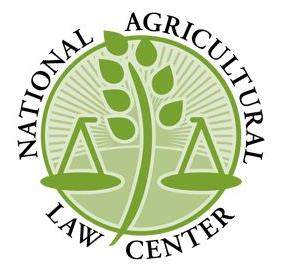
- Established: 1987
- Affiliations: The University of Arkansas
- Director: Harrison M. Pittman
- Location: Fayetteville, Arkansas, United States
- Website: http://www.nationalaglawcenter.org

The National Agricultural Law Center (NALC) at the University of Arkansas is a federally funded, nonpartisan research and information center that serves as the nation's leading source of agricultural and food law research and information. The center, created by Congress in 1987, is the only institution of its kind in the United States and serves the nation's vast agricultural community, including attorneys, farmers, federal and state policymakers, extension personnel, academics, students, consumers, and others.

The center receives federal appropriations through the United States National Agricultural Library, an entity within the USDA Agricultural Research Service. It partners with nine different institutions, including The Ohio State University, The National Association of State Departments of Agriculture, Western Resources Legal Center, Iowa State University, Pennsylvania State University, San Joaquin College of Law, and Texas A&M AgriLife Extension Service.

== About ==
NALC was established in 1987 with a mission to help the agricultural sector better understand the laws and regulations implemented in response to the farm crisis of the 1980s. It was meant to be a nonpartisan entity which takes no position on the views expressed in the articles, writings, and resources published on their website; all articles and writings are included for their legal and practical discussions of agricultural or food law topics rather than any particular viewpoint. Effort is made to supply accurate and up-to-date information, however, the website is not meant as a source of legal advice, nor is it a substitute for a competent legal professional.

The center's website is the primary means by which its agricultural and food law research and information products are disseminated. The website is a clearinghouse for legal information that spans agricultural and food law topics both in the United States and around the world. As such, the website incorporates components that cannot be found elsewhere and provides an important resource to those needing information on legal issues surrounding food and agriculture. To make the information maintained by the website more user-friendly, the site is divided into sections to help focus a user on a particular topic. The center works to serve all members of the agricultural community including producers, federal and state policymakers, extension personnel, and attorneys.

== Services ==
=== Glossary ===
Due to the unique vocabulary contained within food and agricultural law, not commonly used or understood by laypersons, or even attorneys, a glossary was put together to help provide a uniform level of understanding. Chuck Culver, Director for Development for the Division of Agriculture at the University of Arkansas, created and published the Glossary of Agricultural Production, Programs, and Policy—Fourth Edition, an extensive list of legal and non-legal terms, definitions, and acronyms used in the food and agricultural fields. This glossary has been made freely accessible through the NALC website.

=== Reading Rooms ===
One of the most expansive services provided by the National Agricultural Law Center are its Reading Rooms. A Reading Room is a compilation of electronic resources that provides readers with a way to access extensive agricultural and food law research and information related to various agricultural and general law topics. At the beginning of each Reading Room is an Overview article designed to familiarize the reader with the particular subject area and offers a sketch of both the history and the development of the subject; followed by a listing of major federal statutes affecting the area, links to applicable federal regulations, and a case law index of citations to recent common-law authority. Secondary sources relevant to the Reading Room, including Center research publications, Congressional Research Service reports addressing agricultural and food law issues, governmental and non-governmental reference resources, and other publications are also included.

For example, the Agritourism Reading Room defines the term "agritourism" and briefly outlines some potential legal issues inherent in the topic, lists the relevant state and federal statutes that affect this area of the law, provides a case law index of precedential cases, and supplies links to various publications from the federal government, state governments, interested organizations, and experts in the field.

=== Farm bills ===
Another important service provided by the National Agricultural Law Center, and one of the most popular, is the complete collection of digitized farm bills from the original legislation in 1933 to the most recently enacted 2008 Farm Bill, technically known as the Food, Conservation, and Energy Act of 2008. Legislative history of each U.S. Farm Bill, research articles, and links to outside sources concerning the farm bills are included also included in this section of the center's website.

The depth and breadth of material provided in this area of the website surpasses anything else currently available, making it one of the most complete reference collections anywhere for United States Farm Bills.

=== State compilations ===
The State Law Clearinghouse provides readers with access to state statutes and administrative codes that regulate agricultural issues. Many issues pertaining to agriculture and food are administered on the state or local level, and this resource is geared towards providing the statutory language of state laws and regulations that affect agriculture.

=== Reference desk ===
This section contains the links to many different organizations that have some focus on agriculture or agricultural law. Links on this page include government websites, universities, law reviews and journals, associations, practice groups, libraries, and publications.

== Offerings and publications ==
=== The AgLaw Reporter ===
This section includes all issues of the Agricultural Law Update, the professional monthly newsletter of the American Agricultural Law Association (AALA). The Agricultural Law Update Newsletters contain useful and timely articles on a variety of agricultural topics ranging from conservation programs to taxation issues. In addition, the newsletters cover recent cases and laws that affect the nation's agricultural community and the attorneys and policymakers who represent them.

Also included in the area updates to the Federal Register Digest since January, 2002 that provide a brief summary of agricultural and food law regulatory changes published in the Federal Register.

Judicial Officer Decisions on cases heard by those delegated authority by the Secretary of Agriculture to act as the final deciding officer in USDA adjudicatory proceedings are also contained on this page. Case Law Indexes and Case Summaries compiled and written by Center staff and the ever-expanding are also included in the AgLaw Reporter. The case law indexes and the summaries of these cases provide an extensive annotation of the common law surrounding agricultural and food law issues throughout the country and around the world.

The State Law Clearinghouse provides readers with access to state statutes and administrative codes that regulate agricultural and food law issues such as states' biofuels statutes, recreational use statutes, animal cruelty laws, alternative dispute statutes, and climate change legislation. Many issues pertaining to agriculture are administered on the state or local level, and this resource is geared towards providing the statutory language of state laws and regulations that affect agriculture and food.

=== Publications ===
This section contains articles researched and written by the center's staff, leading agricultural and food law scholars, and legal practitioners throughout the country and the world. The publications are grouped by topic and listed in alphabetical order.

As a nonpartisan entity, the center does not advocate for or against any particular viewpoint. While many articles may espouse an author's position on any given issue, the center publishes the articles for the background and legal analysis on the subject. As such, the publications are provided to assist researchers in understanding the complex web of agricultural and food law issues that confront all components of the agricultural sector.

=== Agricultural law bibliography ===
Professor Drew Kershen, Earl Sneed Centennial Professor of Law at the University of Oklahoma College of Law, created the Agricultural Law Bibliography, which is a bibliography of agricultural law that spans over 50 years of law journals, law reviews, and legal periodicals that publish articles, comments, notes, and developments that comprise the body of published research in agricultural and food law. The Agricultural Law Bibliography is updated quarterly and published on the center web site.

Center staff are currently contacting authors and publications listed in the bibliography in an effort to provide digitized copies of as many of the listed articles as possible. More than 1000 articles have been digitized to date.

=== Congressional Research Service Reports ===
The center provides an extensive database of Congressional Research Service Reports pertinent to agricultural and food law and policy issues. The Congressional Research Service reports are a non-partisan objective analysis of a question posed by a congressman or woman and commonly range in length from 5 to around 30 pages. The reports are grouped according to topic and subtopic, including areas such as animal agriculture, international trade, climate change, and environmental law. The center continuously publishes new Congressional Research Service reports as they become available.

== See also ==
- Agricultural Act of 1949
- Agricultural Act of 1954
- Agricultural law
- American Agricultural Law Association
- Food, Conservation, and Energy Act of 2008
