= American Agricultural Law Association =

- Founded: Topeka, Kansas, 1980
- Type: Professional association
- Headquarters: Topeka, Kansas
- Location: Topeka, Kansas, United States
- President: Brandon Davis
- Website: www.aglaw-assn.org

The American Agricultural Law Association (AALA) is a professional organization focusing on the legal needs of the agricultural community in the United States. The association was founded in 1980.

The AALA's mission is:

- That the agricultural industry at every level and rural communities of every size are served by highly competent members of various professions who take pride in their respective professions, are amply rewarded for their contributions, and who are valued members of the community and their professions;
- That members of the legal and other professions serving agriculture and rural communities in every capacity are well-informed, particularly sensitive of the needs of agriculture and rural communities, well-educated, skilled, and knowledgeable, and that every member of the various professions serving agriculture has access to the best, most advanced, and most useful information and support services related to legal and other matters related to agriculture and rural communities;
- That excellent information, advice, and counsel on all issues of agricultural law and law affecting rural communities are readily accessible to those who will benefit therefrom, including farmers, agribusinesses, businesses associated with and serving agriculture, members of the legal profession, educators, policy-makers, and interested members of the public; and
- That the laws and public policies affecting the agricultural industry and rural communities are based on a fundamental understanding of agriculture and individuals comprising agriculture and rural communities, and that such laws and policies are reflective of the special needs and conditions of agriculture and rural communities.

The AALA holds an annual two-day educational symposium in a different U.S. city each year, generally in October.

The AALA has a membership listserv, providing members with a national network of connections and a website with helpful agricultural law information.

== See also ==
- Agricultural Law
- National agricultural law center
- The United States Agricultural & Food Law and Policy Blog
- Agricultural Act of 1949
- Agricultural Act of 1954
