= United States farm bill =

Primary agricultural and food policy instrument of the federal government

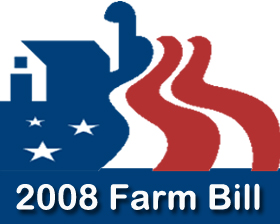
2008 Farm Bill logo

In the United States, the farm bill is a comprehensive omnibus bill that is the primary agricultural and food policy instrument of the federal government. Congress typically passes a new farm bill every five to six years.

Congress makes amendments to provisions of permanent law, reauthorizes, amends, or repeals provisions of preceding temporary agricultural acts, and puts forth new policy provisions for a limited time into the future. Beginning in 1933, farm bills have included sections ("titles") on commodity programs, trade, rural development, farm credit, conservation, agricultural research, food and nutrition programs, marketing, etc.

Some provisions are highly controversial. Provisions can impact international trade, the environment, the food supply, food safety, and the economies of rural America. Powerful interest groups are poised to intervene, including organizations claiming to represent farmers (such as the American Farm Bureau Federation), as well as big agribusiness corporations (such as John Deere, Cargill, Pioneer Hi Bred International (owned by Corteva since 2019), and Monsanto (owned by Bayer since 2018). Congress is polarized along lines of ideology and interest groups. Republicans are more conservative, represent rural areas, and are tied to agricultural groups. On the other hand, Democrats are more liberal and represent rural areas and beneficiaries of nutrition programs. Critics sometimes warn against putting together the agricultural and nutrition parts. However, doing so helps to bridge some of the politically relevant cultural differences that exist between legislators of urban and rural, coastal and heartland areas of the country. Traditionally, the agriculture programs have been more important for rural areas of the heartland, while urban and coastal regions have been more concerned with the nutrition assistance programs. There are stakeholders outside of the government that are also interested in food and agriculture issues. These include national farm groups, commodity associations, state organizations, nutrition and public health officials, advocacy groups representing conservation, recreation, rural development, faith-based interests, local food systems, and organic production. Putting nutrition and agriculture topics together allows for stakeholders and advocacy coalitions with different interests to find common ground on topics that are potentially contentious between them.

Some of the programs that are authorized in a farm bill fall into the spending category of mandatory, while others are discretionary. Programs with mandatory funding have their funds authorized directly within the farm bill. On the other hand, programs with discretionary funding require for congressional appropriators to designate funding to them because they are not funded directly in the farm bill. Cost projections for funding estimates are calculated by the Congressional Budget Office using a baseline, which is an estimate of future costs over ten years if the existing costs were to continue unchanged. Adjustments to funding levels between programs generally occurs from one year to the next, incrementally.

The Agriculture, Rural Development, Food and Drug Administration, and Related Agency Appropriations Act, 2026 included in Public Law 119-37 which ended the 2025 United States federal government shutdown extended the Agriculture Improvement Act of 2018, also known as the 2018 United States farm bill, until September 30, 2026.

== History of farm bills: 1914 to 1981 ==
=== 1920s ===
Farmers demanded relief as the agricultural depression grew steadily worse in the mid-1920s, while the rest of the economy flourished. Farmers had a powerful voice in Congress, and demanded federal subsidies, most notably the McNary–Haugen Farm Relief Bill. It was passed but vetoed by President Coolidge. Coolidge instead supported the alternative program of Commerce Secretary Herbert Hoover and Agriculture Secretary William M. Jardine to modernize farming, by bringing in more electricity, more efficient equipment, better seeds and breeds, more rural education, and better business practices. As president (1929–1933), Hoover set up the Federal Farm Board to promote efficiency and assist funding of cooperatives.

=== New Deal ===
When the Great Depression began in 1929, farm prices fell sharply, and exports fell as well. In this time of agricultural crisis, farmers continued to produce as much as possible in the hopes that selling high quantities would make up for low prices, further contributing to the surplus and low prices. At the same time, the urban areas faced high unemployment, so the entire nation was struggling economically.

The New Deal started three closely related programs after 1933. The Commodity Credit Corporation (CCC) made 12-month loans of cash against the farmers newly planted crops at a fixed price. If the market price rose higher, the farmer could pay off the loan by selling the crop for a profit. If the market price dropped below the fixed loan price, the farmer would give the harvested crop to the CCC. That would cancel the debt and leave the CCC with a storage issue. In effect CCC set a minimum price for crops such as corn, cotton and wheat. The second program was the Agricultural Adjustment Administration (AAA). It paid farmers to replace part of their cash crops with soil conservation grasses. This hoped to reduce the crop supply on the open market and was intended to artificially inflate prices. The CCC and AAA were permanent. The third program was the temporary Farm Credit Administration (FCA) which refinanced farm mortgages in 1934–1935, at lower interest rates.

Farm bills gave financial assistance to farmers who were struggling due to an excess crop supply creating low prices, and also to control and ensure an adequate food supply. The limited benefit to farmers was supposed to outweigh the ongoing hurt to consumers who paid higher food prices. On May 12, 1933, President Franklin D. Roosevelt signed the Agricultural Adjustment Act (AAA) of 1933 into law. The AAA also included a nutrition program for consumers, the precursor to food stamps.

The AAA of 1933 was an abrupt change in policy and was designed as an emergency response to the low prices of commodity crops during the Great Depression. The AAA established a primary federal role in limiting the production of certain agricultural crops including wheat, corn, and cotton hoping to reduce supply in order to artificially inflate food crop prices.

President Roosevelt's New Deal agriculture focused legislation paid farmers to reduce the number of productive acres on their farms, hoping to limit the supply of commodity crops on the market. This was, however, a voluntary program, meaning farmers were not required to remove farm acres from production if they were not interested in government subsidy. Those who participated tended to remove land from production that was already producing poorly, thereby reducing their yield as little as possible, and ultimately limiting the effectiveness of the Act. The AAA was short-lived as the Supreme Court deemed it unconstitutional on January 6, 1936. This was partially due to the processing tax that was used to finance payments to farmers and partially because the Court ruled government regulation of agricultural production within the states unconstitutional.

In 1938, Congress created a more permanent farm bill (the Agricultural Adjustment Act of 1938) with a built-in requirement to update it every five years. The Commodity Credit Corporation limited farm acreage and purchased surplus crops to maintain high prices for farmers.

=== 1940–1980 ===
The Brannan Plan was a 1949 proposal of "compensatory payments" to farmers in response to the problem of large agricultural surpluses stemming from price supports for farmers. It was proposed by Charles Brannan, who served as the fourteenth United States Secretary of Agriculture from 1948 to 1953 as a member of President Harry S. Truman's cabinet. It was blocked by conservatives. The start of the Korean War in June 1950 made the surpluses a vital weapon and prices soared as surpluses were used up, making the proposal irrelevant.

Senator Hubert Humphrey, a leading Democrat, in 1953 convinced bipartisan majorities in Congress to use the Commodity Credit Corporation's store of surplus crops as part of American foreign aid. The idea was that needy nations could buy grain with local currencies rather than scarce dollars, thereby exporting American surpluses and become a major part of American foreign trade policy during the Cold War.

=== 1981–1995 ===
Farm programs under the presidency of Ronald Reagan (1981–1989) were not very successful, even as the rest of the economy soared. Federal budget outlays reached $60 billion during his first term, but real farm income declined to its lowest level in postwar years. The price of farmland declined, causing a series of bankruptcies to farmers who had borrowed to buy neighboring acreage, as well as bankruptcies of local banks. Reagan advisor William A. Niskanen concluded: "One can hardly imagine a more disastrous policy outcome." The 1981 farm bill involved only small changes and continued the policy of restricting supply rather than increasing demand. The 1984 budget proposal was designed to cut subsidies rather than reform the system, but Congress rejected it. Instead, Congress continued the same policies in the 1985 farm bill, which Reagan reluctantly signed. The succeeding George H. W. Bush administration (1989–1993) again continued the same policies. Niskanen said: "The U.S. farm program is still a scandal—raising the price of food to the hungry of the world, increasing the burden to U.S. taxpayers, and restricting the output of the world's most productive farmers."

=== 1996 reforms ===
In 1996, the first major structural change was made to the farm bill when Congress decided farm incomes should be determined by free market forces and stopped subsidizing farmland and purchasing extra grain. Instead, the government began requiring farmers to enroll in a crop insurance program in order to receive farm payments. This led to years of the highest farm subsidies in American history. Direct payments also began in the late 1990s as a way to support struggling farmers, regardless of crop output. These payments allowed grain farmers to receive a government check every year based on yields and acreage of the farm as recorded the previous decade.

== Farm bills since 1996 ==
The first farm bill of the new millennium was the Farm Security Act of 2002, which was signed into law on May 13, 2002. Some of the bill's major changes in comparison to the 1996 bill include an alteration of the farm payment program and the introduction of counter-cyclical farm income support. It also mandates the expansion of conservation land retirement programs and places an emphasis on environmental practices on the farm. Importantly, it restores the eligibility of legal immigrants to food stamps. Additionally, the 2002 farm bill relaxes the rules of the previous farm bill so that more borrowers may be eligible for Federal farm credit assistance, includes several commodities in the list of those that require labeling from their country of origin, and includes new provisions on the welfare of animals.

In 2008, the farm bill was passed as the Food, Conservation, and Energy Act of 2008. The bill included approximately $100 billion in annual spending for Department of Agriculture programs, around 80 percent of which was allocated for food stamps and other nutritional programs.

The 2008 Farm bill increased spending to $288Bn therefore causing controversy at the time by increasing the budget deficit. It increased subsidies for biofuels which the World Bank has named as one of three most important contributors, along with high fuel prices and price speculation, to the 2007–2008 world food price crisis.

President George W. Bush had vetoed the 2008 bill because of its size and cost. However, the veto was overridden by Congress. In 2007, it was found that about 62 percent of farmers did not receive subsidies from the farm bill.

In 2012, while writing the new farm bill, known as the Agriculture Reform, Food and Jobs Act, Congress proposed many ways to cut down the overall cost of the bill, including stricter eligibility standards for food stamps and moving away from direct payments to farmers. However, food stamps and nutrition remained the largest portion of the bill's cost, amounting to a proposed $768.2 billion over ten years. The 2012 bill ultimately failed to pass in the House, which caused Congress to extend the 2008 bill until September 30, 2013. This was enacted as part of the American Taxpayer Relief Act of 2012, passed by Congress on January 1, 2013, and signed into law the next day by President Barack Obama. (Public Law No: 112-240)

Between the passage of the 2008 farm bill and the creation of the 2013 bill, the food stamp program changed its name to the Supplemental Nutrition Assistance Program (SNAP), and nearly doubled in size. The proposed 2013 bill would cut funding to SNAP by about $400 million a year, which amounts to half a percent of spending from previous years. Under an amendment introduced by Senators Dick Durbin (D-Ill.) and Tom Coburn (R-Okla.), it would also reduce crop insurance subsidies by 15 percent for the top 1 percent of U.S. wealthiest farmers, those with a gross annual income of more than $750,000. The new bill also proposed a new insurance program for dairy producers which would cut costs by eliminating other dairy subsidies and price supports.

The 2013 farm bill was approved in the Senate on June 10, 2013, but did not pass the House.

The 2014 farm bill, known as the Agricultural Act of 2014, was passed by Congress and signed into law by President Barack Obama on February 7, 2014, two years late, as authority under its predecessor, the Food, Conservation, and Energy Act of 2008 had expired September 30, 2012. Instating modifications across multiple fronts, the bill optimized conservation programs, targeted adjustments to the Supplemental Nutrition Assistance Program (SNAP), and broadened initiatives for upcoming farmers, crops, rural development, and bioenergy. Introduced as part of the Agricultural Act of 2008, the 2014 Farm Act repealed the Direct and Counter-Cyclical Program (DCP) and the Average Crop Revenue Election (ACRE) programs. In their place, it introduced new commodity programs, including the Price Loss Coverage (PLC) program and the Agriculture Risk Coverage (ARC) program. These programs provided support to farmers when crop prices or revenues fell below certain reference levels. The bill further enhanced the crop insurance safety net by offering additional choices for insurance coverage, including options for different levels of protection against yield losses and price declines. With a forecasted budget reduction of $17 billion over ten years, the federally subsidized crop insurance program received an annual disbursement of $1.4 billion to provide farmers with policies. Meanwhile, the food stamp program remained unaltered, shouldering 62 percent of farmers' premium expenditures.

=== 2018–2027 ===
The 2018 farm bill, or Agriculture Improvement Act of 2018, was passed by Congress and signed into law by President Donald Trump on December 20, 2018. It primarily reauthorized many programs in the 2014 Farm Bill. About three-quarters of the budget was allocated for nutritional programs such as SNAP, though the remaining quarter placed a higher emphasis on conservation efforts. With the introduction of the Clean Lakes, Estuaries, and Rivers Initiative (CLEAR 30) and the Soil Health and Income Protection Pilot Program (SHIPP), greater emphasis was placed on soil and water quality, thereby advancing conservation initiatives. It also introduced the declassification of hemp and hemp seed products, entrusting the Food and Drug Administration (FDA) to oversee hemp production and application. Resulting in the formation of the CBD Policy Working Group, the FDA employed cannabidiol as an active ingredient in pediatric treatments and other innovations.

The following titles in the 2018 farm bill fund efforts to reduce the environmental impact of farming and to address climate change.

- Title II, Conservation: Provides assistance to agricultural producers to address environmental resource concerns on private land. It encourages environmental stewardship and improved management through land retirement, conservation easements, working lands assistance, and partnership opportunities.
- Title VIII, Forestry: Supports forestry management programs run by USDA's Forest Service. Some of the areas that relate to climate change are wildland fire management, forest management, and restoration and protection of water sources and watersheds. Provisions are included to protect, restore, or improve greater sage-grouse and/or mule-deer habitat.
- Title IX, Energy: Encourages the development of farm and community renewable energy systems through various programs, including grants and loan guarantees. It funds research and development of energy obtained from agricultural or forestry feedstocks, commonly called bioenergy. The most prevalent form of bioenergy is ethanol. Title IX provides some financing for commercial scale production of such energy resources.

== Non–farm bill agriculture legislation ==
- Federal Farm Loan Act of 1916
- Frazier–Lemke Farm Bankruptcy Act of 1934
- Bankhead–Jones Farm Tenant Act of 1937
- Farm Credit Act of 1971

== Farm bills ==
According to a Congressional Research Service primer about the 2018 farm bill, eighteen farm bills have been enacted since the 1930s.

1. Agricultural Adjustment Act of 1933
2. Agricultural Adjustment Act of 1938
3. Agricultural Act of 1948
4. Agricultural Act of 1949
5. Agricultural Act of 1954
6. Agricultural Act of 1956
7. Food and Agriculture Act of 1965
8. Agricultural Act of 1970
9. Agriculture and Consumer Protection Act of 1973
10. Food and Agriculture Act of 1977
11. Agriculture and Food Act of 1981
12. Food Security Act of 1985
13. Food, Agriculture, Conservation, and Trade Act of 1990
14. Federal Agriculture Improvement and Reform Act of 1996
15. Farm Security and Rural Investment Act of 2002
16. Food, Conservation, and Energy Act of 2008
17. Agricultural Act of 2014
18. Agriculture Improvement Act of 2018

== Proposed farm bills ==
- Federal Agriculture Reform and Risk Management Act of 2013 (H.R. 1947; 113th Congress) (H.R. 1947) – failed passage in the House
- Agriculture Reform, Food, and Jobs Act of 2013 (S. 954; 113th Congress) (S. 954) – passed the Senate, failed in the House
- Farm, Food, and National Security Act of 2026 (H.R. 7567; 119th Congress)

== Criticism ==
Critics have alleged that, regardless of the initial intent of farm bills dating back to 1933, farm bills dating from at least the 1990s to the present have caused numerous harms, including:

- Increasing the cost of food for lower- and middle-income consumers, especially sugar.
- Incentivizing the farming of only a select small number of crops, making Americans and global consumers less healthy by focusing diets more and more on fewer and fewer commodity food items, harming national security by highly centralizing the food production and supply chain within the United States.
- Harming public health in terms of authorizing certain pesticides to be used without oversight.

One expert said of the farm bill that:

"It is a symbol of everything that’s wrong with Congress, revealing how life-sustaining policies can be taken hostage by a handful of parochial lawmakers; how incredibly difficult it is to make even minor changes that would actually help consumers and small businesses; and how intractable the divide on Capitol Hill has become, particularly between urban and rural legislators."

Numerous attempts have been made to repeal the need to continue to reauthorize any sort of so-called "farm bill" at all, and instead leave farm and food prices to market forces, these attempts have failed.

The aspect of the bill that specifically benefits big domestic sugar and the Fanjul brothers of Domino Sugar in particular has also had numerous attempts at repeal, but each time has thus far as of 2023 failed to be repealed, artificially raising the price of sugar for domestic United States consumers, while at the same time personally enriching domestic sugar producers. The largest donor in support of this particular aspect of the farm bill is the Fanjul brothers, infamous for giving to both Republican Party candidates as well as Democratic Party candidates to lobby to keep the sugar subsidy and keep out international competition from the American market demands for sugar.

== See also ==
- Alternative Agricultural Research and Commercialization Corporation
- Farmers' suicides in the United States
