= CSFP =

CSFP may refer to:

== Programs ==
- Commonwealth Scholarship and Fellowship Plan, an international programme under which Commonwealth governments offer scholarships and fellowships to citizens of other Commonwealth countries.
- Commodity Supplemental Food Program, a program of the United States Department of Agriculture.

== Places ==
- City of San Fernando, Pampanga, abbreviated as CSFP, regional center of Central Luzon and provincial capital of Pampanga, Philippines.

== Other ==
- Compact Small Form-factor Pluggable transceiver, a Small Form-factor Pluggable transceiver variant
