= Agricultural law =

Law relates to agribusiness

Agricultural law, sometimes referred to as Ag Law, deals with such legal issues as agricultural cooperatives, seed, water, fertilizer, pesticide use, agricultural finance, agricultural labour, agricultural marketing, agricultural insurance, farming rights, land tenure and tenancy system and law on Agricultural processing and rural industry. With implementation of modern technologies, issues including credit, intellectual property, trade and commerce related to agricultural products are dealt within the sphere of this law.

Simply put, agricultural law is the study of the special laws and regulations that apply to the production and sale of agricultural products. "Agricultural exceptionalism," i.e., the use of legal exceptions to protect the agricultural industry, is pervasive, worldwide.

== History ==
Agriculture law is ancient, dating at least from the English Common law in the 17th century; Aldred's Case (1610) is an English land law and tort law case on nuisance, whereby a person has a cause of action when their immediate neighbor has a pigsty adjacent to their house.

Ireland's parliament passed what might have been the first animal welfare legislation, An Act against Plowing by the Tayle, and pulling the Wooll off living Sheep, in 1635.

American law schools and legal scholars first recognized agricultural law as a discipline in the 1940s when law schools at Yale, Harvard, Texas, and Iowa explored and initiated agricultural law courses. These early efforts were short-lived, however, and agricultural law as a distinct discipline did not resurface for three decades. In 1979, a scholarly journal, The Agricultural Law Journal was initiated. In 1980, the American Agricultural Law Association was formed and an advanced law degree program, the LL.M. Program in Agricultural Law was founded at the University of Arkansas School of Law. In 1981, a fifteen volume Agricultural Law Treatise was published and in 1985, the first law school casebook, Agricultural Law: Cases and Materials was published by West Publishing.

In recent years, agricultural law studies have expanded to incorporate a wider consideration of the impact of agricultural production, including issues of environmental law, sustainability, animal welfare, and food law and policy. Reflecting this expanded perspective, in 2009, the LL.M. Program in Agricultural Law at Arkansas changed its name to the LL.M Program in Agricultural and Food Law. In 2010, the second law school textbook was published with the title, Food, Farming & Sustainability: Readings in Agricultural Law. And, in 2012, the American Association of Law Schools changed the name of its Agricultural Law section to Agricultural and Food Law. The emerging discipline of food law & policy traces its roots to the discipline of agricultural law as well as tradition food and drug law.

== Agricultural exceptionalism ==
Agricultural exceptionalism is defined as "the notion that farm life and food production require special protections." Today, agricultural exceptionalism in the U.S. is seen in national policy and legal frameworks, as well as in the political power imbalance between agricultural employers and agricultural workers. A key example of agricultural exceptionalism is “right to farm laws.” These laws make it difficult to protect farm workers and their surrounding communities and environments by following a legal framework known as “coming to the nuisance.” The framework essentially prioritizes people who use the land first and provides them protection from nuisance lawsuits. For example, people who move near a farming area would have difficulty successfully suing a farm on the basis of pollution or similar grievances, because the law prioritizes the group that first made use of the land. As a result, agricultural employers tend to have more protections from nuisance law suits regarding how their practices may impact its surroundings.

Politically, farmworkers are also at a disadvantage. Agricultural employers have strong influence in national policymaking, for example, they have a dedicated national agency (U.S. Department of Agriculture). A majority of the farmworker population also identifies as immigrants, as a result increasing their vulnerability because their immigration status is tied to their employer. 17% of agricultural workers are considered H-2A employees, meaning that their visa is directly tied to their employer or the H-2A labor contractor. In a report by the human trafficking non-profit Polaris, agriculture makes up 87.47% of the H-2A labor trafficking industry. Among all labor trafficking victims, 58% reported being threatened with immigration consequences if they spoke up against unfair labor practices. Overall, agricultural exceptionalism is a key characteristic of agricultural law.

== See also ==
- Adjusted Gross Revenue Insurance
- Agricultural Act of 1949
- Agricultural Act of 1954
- Agricultural district
- National Agricultural Law Center
- American Agricultural Law Association
