= Love v. Vilsack =

2001 U.S. case relating to female farmers

Love v. Vilsack refers to the 2001 lawsuit filed by a group of women farmers against the USDA. The lawsuit alleged that the USDA discriminated against female farmers through the agricultural loan process, and specifically named the Farm Service Agency (FSA). This lawsuit is often discussed in conjunction with Garcia v. Vilsack because of its similar timeline and like the Garcia v. Vilsack, the claims process for female farmers was voluntary, which meant that female farmers had to file claims individually.

== Lawsuit ==
The plaintiffs claimed that they were being discriminated against based on their gender. This discrimination focused on the number of loans that were denied to female farmers, the unequal distribution of loans, tardy loans given by the USDA, and the failure to investigate claims filed by the female farmers. The plaintiffs also alleged that the discrimination occurred at their local USDA offices and that government officials did not classify women as farmers.

In court, the female farmers attempted to be certified as a class. The female farmers did so under the ECOA and the APA. However, in 2001, the district court presiding over the case dismissed one of the female farmer's claims, the claim that the USDA had failed to investigate claims filed by the female farmers. In 2004, the female farmers were denied class certification. The court ruled this because the plaintiffs were unable to present a commonality as a class. Subsequent appeals by the plaintiffs were dismissed at the DC Circuit Court and in 2010, the Supreme Court refused to hear the plaintiff's appeal.

== Verdict ==
The 2008 farm bill placed $1.33 billion aside for women farmers and Hispanic farmers that had filed claims against the USDA. In 2012, the resolution process became known as the "Hispanic and Women Farmers and Ranchers Claims Resolution Process". Similar Garcia v. Vilsack, the settlement process for female farmers was voluntary, which meant that female farmers had to file claims individually.

== Claims process ==
Claimants had to have been the owner or tenant operator of a family farm, between January 1, 1981, and December 31, 1996, or between October 19, 1998, and October 19, 2000. Claimants also had to follow certain criteria's in relation to the failure of the USDA in providing loans to the female farmers. Claimants also had to believe that the actions of the USDA happened because the claimants were female and that these actions caused economic damage to the farmers. In addition, claimants must have filed a complaint with the USDA claiming discrimination on the basis of their gender. The USDA separated successful claimants into two tiers, tier two would receive a full payment of $50,000 while tier one claimants would receive less than $50,000, any judicator would make the final decision concerning compensation.
