= National Wool Act of 1954 =

- Long title: An Act to provide for greater stability in agriculture; to augment the marketing and disposal of agricultural products; and for other purposes.
- Nicknames: Agricultural Act of 1954
- Enacted by: the 83rd United States Congress
- Effective: August 28, 1954

Citations
- Public law: 83-690
- Statutes at Large: 68 Stat. 897 aka 68 Stat. 910

Codification
- Titles amended: 7 U.S.C.: Agriculture
- U.S.C. sections created: 7 U.S.C. ch. 44 § 1781 et seq.

Legislative history
- Introduced in the House as H.R. 9680; Passed the House on July 2, 1954 (228-170); Reported by the joint conference committee on August 17, 1954; agreed to by the Senate on August 17, 1954 (44-28) and by the House on August 17, 1954 (agreed/passed); Signed into law by President Dwight D. Eisenhower on August 28, 1954

The National Wool Act of 1954 (Title VII of Agricultural Act of 1954 (P.L. 83-690)) provided for a new and permanent price support program for wool and mohair to encourage increased domestic production through incentive payments.

Wool and mohair commodity programs were in effect through marketing year 1995, at which time it was terminated under the explicit mandate of P.L. 103–130, Sec. 1.

== See also ==
- Amendments to the National Wool Act
