= Commodity Supplemental Food Program =

United States food assistance program

The Commodity Supplemental Food Program (CSFP) provides supplementary United States Department of Agriculture (USDA) food packages to the low-income elderly of at least 60 years of age. It is one of the fifteen federally-funded nutrition assistance programs of the Food and Nutrition Service (FNS), a USDA agency. The CSFP currently serves about 600,000 low‐income people every month.

CSFP formerly served low-income pregnant and breastfeeding women and children, until February 6, 2014, when the responsibility to supplement their diets was shifted to the WIC: Special Supplemental Nutrition Program for Women, Infants and Children.

== History ==
CSFP began in 1969, and originally aimed at providing foods to pregnant or postpartum women, infants, and children up to age six. And as every Farm Bill passed, the program evolved. In 1973, the program was officially authorized and funded with the Agriculture and Consumer Protection Act, and with the 1977 Farm Bill, its current name was set.

Eight years later, with the Food Security Act of 1985, the program expanded to include elderly participation, albeit at a lower priority than the original ones. However, in the Food, Conservation, and Energy Act of 2008, the priority status given women, infants, and children before the elderly in program participation is removed and food packages are distributed equally.

With the Agricultural Act of 2014, the Commodity Supplemental Food Program stopped serving women and receiving new eligible children, focusing only on serving to the seniors. And as of April 2026, the remaining women and children have been completely phased out of the program

== Eligibility ==
In order to be eligible for CSFP as of 2016, certain requirements need to be met:

Territory: The program is available in every state; the District of Columbia as well as the Red Lake and Pine Ridge Indian Reservations.

Age: Individuals interested in joining must be at least 60 years old.

Income limits: Elderly candidates' incomes are measured under 130% of the Federal Poverty Income Guidelines, while remaining children's household incomes (under six years old) are evaluated under 185%:

	Federal Poverty Guidelines - 100%	Children - 185%			Elderly - 130%		
Household Size	Annual	Annual	Monthly	Weekly	Annual	Monthly	Weekly
1	$11,880	$21,978	$1,832	$423	$15,444	$1,287	$297
2	16,020	29,637	2,470	570	20,826	1,736	401
3	20,160	37,296	3,108	718	26,208	2,184	504
4	24,300	44,955	3,747	865	31,590	2,633	608
5	28,440	52,614	4,385	1,012	36,972	3,081	711
6	32,580	60,273	5,023	1,160	42,354	3,530	815
7	36,730	67,951	5,663	1,307	47,749	3,980	919
8	40,890	75,647	6,304	1,455	53,157	4,430	1,023
For each household member add	4,160	7,696	642	148	5,408	451	109

== Food packages ==
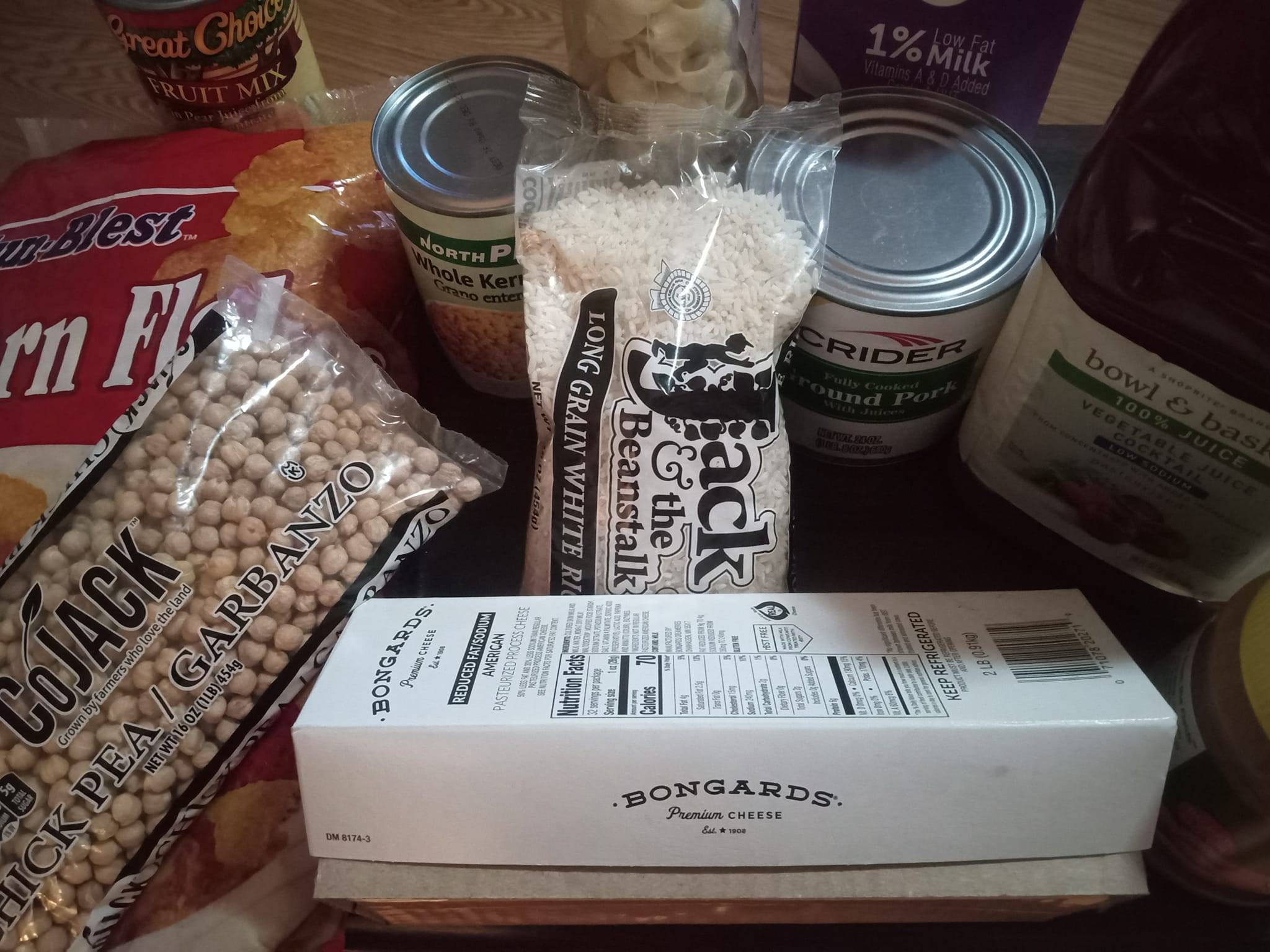
A commodities distribution under the Commodity Supplemental Food Program

CSFP food monthly distribution rates for 2016 include:

- Cereals, dry ready-to-eat; farina; rolled oats; potatoes; pasta
- Fruits and vegetables: beans, carrots, peas,
- Proteins: beef stew, chili, chicken, salmon
- Milk, peanut butter and cheese.

According to Policy Memorandum FD-079, redistribution of CSFP food packages is not permitted.

== Funding ==
CSFP funding is currently set by USDA at $74.53 per participant slot every year, as a system based on caseload allocation. It then provides food and administrative funds to the states, which are used for the storage, delivery & distribution of food packages.

As a discretionary program, CSFP can only serve as many eligible participants as funding per state allows. This may drastically vary, since some states count with the support of non-profit local distribution agencies, and Feeding America food banks are only available in 22 states.

Federal funding is reauthorized through the Farm Bill every 5 years. In 2016, the total of administrative funds amounted to $45,854,335, with a total caseload of 619,000 participants.

== See also ==
- Food and Nutrition Service
- United States Department of Agriculture
- Special Supplemental Nutrition Program for Women, Infants and Children
