= NALC =

NALC may refer to:

- National Agricultural Law Center, a research and information center for agriculture and food law in the United States
- National Association of Letter Carriers, a labor union of city letter carriers employed by the United States Postal Service
- National Association of Local Councils, a body which represents the interests of parish and town councils in England
- North American Lutheran Church a Lutheran church synod formed in 2010
