= Colorado Protect Animals from Unnecessary Suffering and Exploitation Initiative (2022) =

Ballot measure

In Colorado, backers of a proposed 2022 ballot initiative are collecting signatures to stop “sexual acts on animals” and revamp animal cruelty statutes. The proposed initiative was given the go-ahead in March, 2021 to collect signatures of registered voters, to qualify the initiative to appear on the ballot. The initiative petitions will be due on October 18, 2021. If it is found that the petitions were signed by at least 124,632 registered Colorado voters, the initiative will be placed on Colorado's November 8, 2022 general election ballot.

The initiative is self-named, within its text, as the Protect Animals from Unnecessary Suffering and Exploitation initiative. Its current numerical designation is "Initiative 16".

The proposed initiative requires cows, pigs, and other livestock to live at least 25% of their natural lives before slaughter. The ballot measures define lifespans as 20 years for cows, eight years for chickens, 10 years for turkeys, 15 years for pigs and sheep, and six years for rabbits and ducks. It would also expand the statutory definition of "sexual act on an animal".

According to KUSA-TV, "The Colorado Cattlemen's Association has joined other Ag groups like Colorado Farm Bureau, Colorado Wool Growers Association, Colorado Dairy Farmers, Colorado Livestock Association and Colorado Pork Producers Council to unite against the initiative".

== Ballot Title ==
Colorado's Ballot Title Setting Board designated the initiative's title as follows:

A change to the Colorado Revised Statutes concerning expanding crimes relating to cruelty to animals, and, in connection therewith, expanding the definition of “livestock” to include fish; expanding the definition of “sexual act with an animal” to include intrusion or penetration, however slight, into an animal’s anus or genitals with an object or part of a person’s body and removing the existing exception for animal husbandry practices and creating an exception for care to improve the animal’s health; defining the “natural lifespan” for certain species of livestock and providing that slaughtering those animals is not criminal animal cruelty if done according to accepted animal husbandry practices after the animal has lived 1/4 of the natural lifespan; removing the exception to the animal cruelty statutes for animal husbandry practices used in the care of companion or livestock animals; eliminating some exceptions to certain sentencing requirements; and providing that, in case of a conflict with animal care otherwise authorized by law, the criminal cruelty to animals statutes control.

== Support and opposition ==
=== Supporting organizations ===
- Colorado PAUSE
- Fur Free Boulder
- Yes On IP13

=== Opposing organizations ===
- Coloradans for Animal Care—A coalition of livestock and farming groups formed for the purpose of opposing the initiative
- Colorado Egg Producers
- Colorado Horse Council
- Livestock Marketing Association
- Rocky Mountain Farmers Union

== See also ==
- Cruelty to animals
- Animal law
- Animal welfare
- Intensive animal farming
- Agricultural law
