= Agriculture and Consumer Protection Act of 1973 =

United States federal law

- Long title: An original bill to extend and amend the Agricultural Act of 1970 for the purpose of assuring consumers of plentiful supplies of food and fiber at reasonable prices.
- Nicknames: 1973 U.S. Farm Bill; Agriculture and Consumer Protection Act
- Enacted by: the 93rd United States Congress
- Effective: August 10, 1973

Citations
- Public law: 93–86
- Statutes at Large: 87 Stat. 221

Legislative history
- Introduced in the Senate as S. 1888 by Herman Talmadge (D–GA) on May 23, 1973; Committee consideration by Agriculture, Nutrition and Forestry; Passed the Senate on June 8, 1973 (78–9); Passed the House of Representatives on July 19, 1973 (226–182) with amendment; Senate agreed to House of Representatives amendment on July 31, 1973 (85–7) with further amendment; House of Representatives agreed to Senate amendment on August 3, 1973 (252–151, with further amendment; Senate agreed on August 3, 1973); Signed into law by President Richard Nixon on August 10, 1973

The Agriculture and Consumer Protection Act of 1973 (P.L. 93-86, also known as the 1973 U.S. Farm Bill) was the 4-year farm bill that adopted target prices and deficiency payments as a tool that would support farm income but reduce forfeitures to the Commodity Credit Corporation (CCC) of surplus stocks. (Target prices were eliminated by the 1996 farm bill (P.L. 104-127), but restored by the 2002 farm bill (P.L. 101-171, Sec. 1104).) It reduced payment limitations to $20,000 (from $55,000 set in 1970) for all program crops. The Act might be considered the first omnibus farm bill because it went beyond simply authorizing farm commodity programs. It authorized disaster payments and disaster reserve inventories; created the Rural Environmental Conservation Program; amended the Food Stamp Act of 1964 (P.L. 88-525), authorized the use of commodities for feeding low income mothers and young children (the origin of the Commodity Supplemental Food Program; and amended the Consolidated Farm and Rural Development Act of 1972 (P.L. 92-419).
