= Optional flex acreage =

United States agricultural policy

Optional flex acreage is a term in United States agricultural policy.

Under the planting flexibility provision of the Agricultural Act of 1949, as amended by the 1990 farm bill, producers could choose to plant up to 25% of the crop acreage base in other Commodity Credit Corporation (CCC)-specified crops (except fruits and vegetables) without a reduction in crop acreage bases on the farm, but receive no deficiency payments on this acreage. The Omnibus Budget Reconciliation Act of 1990 further amended the 1949 Act to make a 15% reduction in payment acreage mandatory. The remaining 10% was optional flex acreage. Optional flex acreage was eligible for deficiency payments when planted to the program crop. The 1996 farm bill (P.L. 104-127) expanded planting flexibility to all of the base acres, and this policy was continued by the 2002 farm bill (P.L. 101-171, Sec. 1106).
