= Soil Bank Act =

The Soil Bank Act of 1956 was part of the Agricultural Act of 1956 passed by the U.S. Congress. This act created the Soil Bank Program, which removed farmland from production in an effort to reduce large crop surpluses after World War II. Land deposited into the Soil Bank was then converted into conservation use. The idea for the Soil Bank was taken from legislation from the 1930s dust bowl and was similar to many depression-era solutions to lower crop prices. Eventually, the Soil Bank act of 1956 was overturned by the Food and Agriculture Act of 1965.

== History ==
Following World War II, the government struggled with how to deal with the large farm surpluses that had been created by price supports. The first proposed solution to the problem was the Brannan Plan proposed by Secretary of Agriculture, C. F. Brannan, in 1949. The Brannan plan allowed for the treasury to pay farmers the difference between market prices and a modernized parity price. The Brannan plan was praised because it would eliminate the need to store surpluses and is also beneficial to the American for the goodbye across the low prices. However, the Brannan plan was never instituted. Many labor consumer groups supported plan as well as the Americans for Democratic action, and the NFU. However, most labor economists opposed the plan "for its failure to make provisions for the adjustment for support levels in light of demand and supply and for setting these levels and excessive 100% parity." The Soil Bank act fall of the Brannan plan and was a less radical solution to the problem of crop surpluses. The Soil Bank act was similar to many Depression-era solutions.

== Effects ==
The Soil Bank act of 1956 created the Soil Bank Program. This act was devised to reduce supplies of basic commodities by achieving a 10 to 17% reduction in plowland through payments to farmers who shifted land out of production to be held in the Soil Bank. The Soil Bank converted 80% of the cost of converting from crop to conservation land. Annual payments were also provided to participating states. The payments were based on base price per commodity in the amount of land surrendered. In the south, these annual payments varied from about $8.68 per acre in 1956 to about $11.85 per acre in 1960. From 1956 to 1960, the Soil Bank converted 28,700,000 acres nationwide from crop production to conservation uses. 2.2 million of these acres were used for tree planting, of which 1,922,604 were planted in the southern states of Virginia, South Carolina, North Carolina, Georgia, Florida, Alabama, Mississippi, Tennessee, Arkansas, Louisiana, Texas and Oklahoma.

Studies on the effects of the Soil Bank have shown that in Georgia, after 18 years, 83.1% of the land dedicated to trees remains forested. The study showed that after 33 years, 80% of land nationally remains forested. The same study found that only 2.5% of the land dedicated to trees has been re-converted back to cropland.

== Economic impact ==
By reducing the amount of land that was actually producing crops, the Soil Bank act hoped to reduce the supply of certain crops. Due to this decrease in the supply, many food prices would rise, which was the government solution to the large surpluses. In 1957, J. Carol Bottum found that the Soil Bank program was unsuccessful in the Wisconsin corn and dairy area because it failed to materially reduce agricultural output. However, some benefits of the Soil Bank or found including that increased mobility of farmers by "making it possible to reduce farm operations without loss of income and still retain the security of the farm case of layoff." One negative effect of the Soil Bank with that also shrunk the amount of land farmers were able to rent out to others or rent for themselves. This made it difficult for some small farmers to expand their operations. The Soil Bank act was repealed by the Food and Agriculture Act of 1965.
