= Food and Agriculture Councils =

The Food and Agriculture Councils (FACs) were instituted in 1982 by the United States Department of Agriculture (USDA) to function as interagency coordinating groups on three levels: national, state, and local. The state FACs are composed of senior level officials of individual USDA agencies within each state, and in the mid-90s they played a major role in managing the reorganization of USDA's field office structure. Local FACs have consisted of USDA representatives at county or area-wide levels; and a national FAC at USDA's Washington headquarters has served as a liaison with the state and local FACs.
