= Fameal =

Fameal is a general word for a food product, used by Non-governmental organizations (NGOs), in programs to feed the hungry as a part of the Agricultural Act of 1949. The food product is made up of a wheat-soy meal blend or a cornmeal-soy blend (WSB or CSB, corn soy blend). This food is distributed, often aided by volunteers, in the Caribbean and West Africa.

== Typical usage ==
A premade mix of fameal is extrusion cooked for usage under primitive conditions. In this form, the meal is eaten as a thin paste or thickened and made into dumplings or bread.

== Nutritional components ==
The general measures of fameal are:

- 50% (by volume) Cornmeal or Whole-wheat flour.
- 30% (by volume) Bean meal, of any kind, including soy. Lentils are sometimes used due to ease of grinding and fast cooking.
- 10% (by volume) Cooking Oil. Any cooking oil works.
- 10% (by volume) Sugar, honey, syrup, or similar sweetener.
- Salt for taste.
- Multi-vitamin powder, or multi-vitamins ground to a meal.

The fameal is a powder which can be mixed slowly with boiling water or used as a flour replacement for baking, similar to cornbread, or as a cake mix.

CSB Plus - formula ingredients percentage (by weight):

- Corn (white or yellow) 78.47
- Whole soybeans 20
- Vitamin/Mineral 0.20
- Tri-Calcium Phosphate 1.16
- Potassium chloride 0.17

Nutritional value per 100g dry matter:

- a. Energy: 380 kcal minimum
- b. Protein: 14.0% (N x 6.25) minimum
- c. Fat: 6.0% minimum
- d. Crude Fiber: 5.0% maximum
