= Alternative Agricultural Research and Commercialization Corporation =

As authorized by the 1990 farm bill (P.L. 101–624), the Alternative Agricultural Research and Commercialization Corporation (AARCC) was originally established as the Applied Agricultural Research Commercialization Center in the USDA to be a public venture capital agency that would invest in small businesses to help them develop and commercialize new nonfood products from agricultural and forestry commodities. The 1996 farm bill (P.L. 104–127) changed the center from a government agency to a wholly owned venture capital corporation of USDA. Congress repealed the authority for AARCC in the 2002 farm bill (P.L. 107–171, Sec. 6201).
