= Garcia v. Vilsack =

Garcia v. Vilsack refers to a 2000 lawsuit brought by a hundred Hispanic farmers against the USDA, with the farmers claiming the organization had discriminated against Latino/Hispanic farmers. This lawsuit was filed at the US District Court for the District of Columbia.

The lawsuit is often recognized in conjunction with other group lawsuits filed against the USDA which include: Pigford v. Glickman (filed by African American farmers), Keepseagle v. Vilsack (filed by Native American farmers), and Love v. Vilsack (filed by female farmers). The lawsuit claimed that the USDA discriminated against Hispanic/Latino farmers in credit transactions, disaster benefits, and loan distributions, which violated the Equal Credit Opportunity Act (ECOA), and in failing to review cases of alleged discriminations.

== Background ==
Prior to the Garcia v. Vilsack, a 1994 study of the Farm Service Agency, a program within the USDA, was conducted by the consulting firm D.J. Miller & Associates on behalf of the USDA. The purpose of the study was to look into the FSA's treatment of females and minorities, and specifically the organizations programs and payments. The study ultimately found that minority farmers were less likely to participate in the program because of the lengthy process, because farmers were not knowledgeable on rules and regulations, and minority farmers distrust of those processing appeals.

The case name comes from Jose Guadalupe Garcia, the primary plaintiff who was a third generation farmer from Las Cruces, New Mexico. In an appearance before the US House of Representatives, Garcia stated that loan officers and neighbors had worked in conjunction to bankrupt Garcia and his brother. Garcia's neighbors did eventually purchase his land.

The Garcia case came a year after Pigford v. Glickman (1999) which awarded African American farmers nearly $2 billion. Meanwhile, Native American farmers filed a class action lawsuit against the USDA, also known as Keepseagle v. Vilsack. Keepseagle was ultimately settled in 2010 for $680 million.

== Rulings ==
A 2002 ruling by the district court did not classify the Hispanic/Latino farmers as a class therefore, Hispanic farmers who still wanted to file against the USDA had to do so individually. In addition to this, the farmers also experienced difficulties pinpointing the source of discrimination within the organization. This is in part due to the practice due to the large number of employees that the USDA employed across a number of departments who were then responsible for making decisions regarding farmers qualifications for loans and benefits. The statute of limitations established by the 2002 ruling, which gave a time frame from January 1, 1981, through December 31, 1996 and October 13, 1998, through 2002, meant that a number of Hispanic farmworkers were ineligible to file against the USDA.

In 2011, the USDA and the Department of Justice began allowing Hispanic and Latino farmers to participate in a voluntary claims process that would:

- set aside $1.33 billion to compensate eligible farmers and their discrimination claims
- provide $160 million in debt relief
- provide awards ranging from $50,000 or $250,000. This amount varied depending on the claim filed.
- provide tax relief and loan forgiveness to some farmers whose claims were accepted
- provide tax relief and loan forgiveness to some farmers whose claims were accepted

The deadline to file a settlement claim ended on March 25, 2013. As of 2015, the USDA had only approved 14.4% of the 50,000 claims filed. A common response by the USDA in denying claims was the following: "You failed to provide sufficient documentation, or the documentation that you provided was not sufficient to meet the requirements under the Framework".

Some Hispanic farmers believe that the settlement offer In the 2011 ruling was not enough compared to the settlement offered in the Pigford case. Because of this, some farmers used the fifth amendment to file a lawsuit claiming that the Garcia settlement offer was itself discriminatory. However, this lawsuit was dismissed by a federal district court.
