= Agricultural district =

In United States agricultural law, agricultural district is a planning term which defines an area within a local jurisdiction where farming is the preferred economic activity. Districts may be voluntarily created by landowners who receive benefits, usually in return for not developing the land for a certain number of years, or they may be designated in a local land use plan. An agricultural district is not a conservation district.
