= United States Agricultural Society =

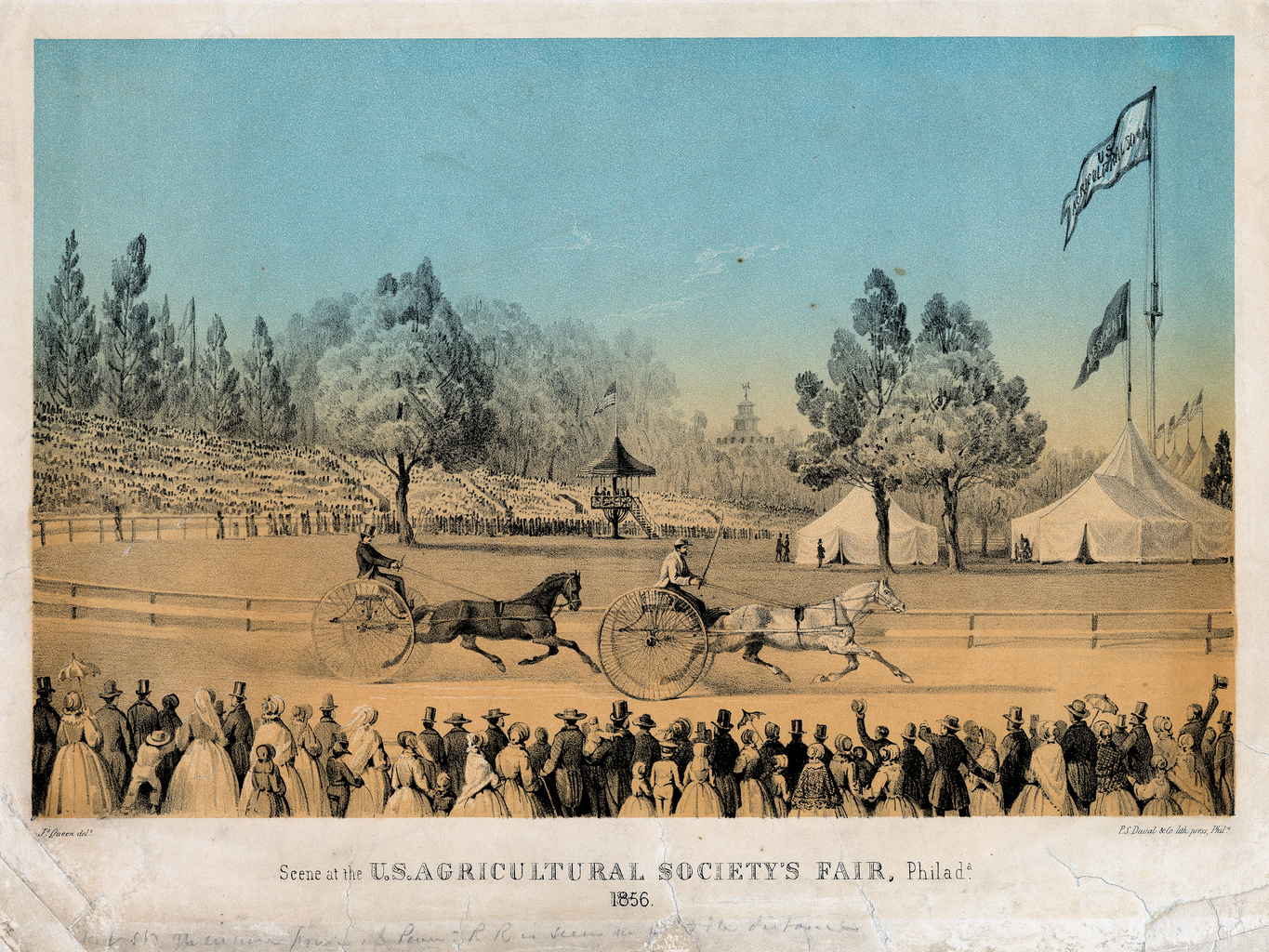
Scene at the U.S. Agricultural Society's Fair, Philadelphia, 1856

United States Agricultural Society (USAS) was founded in 1852.

== Background ==
The United States Agricultural Society was founded during a convention. Twelve different states in the country had agricultural societies. They decided to become one unit, creating the USAS. It was started at a time when there was no Department of Agriculture in the United States government, before Abraham Lincoln established an independent Department of Agriculture. An attempt was made by Solon Robinson to start an agricultural body in 1841, but it was given up in 1843. The United States Agricultural Society was founded when the Massachusetts State Board of Agriculture along with 11 other bodies decided to form the United States Agricultural Society. The Society held its annual meeting in Washington DC and held exhibitions in other cities in the United States. It was powerful body with the ability to influence Congress and was able to influence the Congress to bring in enactments the Land Grants Act and creation of Department of Agriculture in 1862 can be attributed to it.
