= United States Department of Agriculture Building =

Department of Agriculture Building
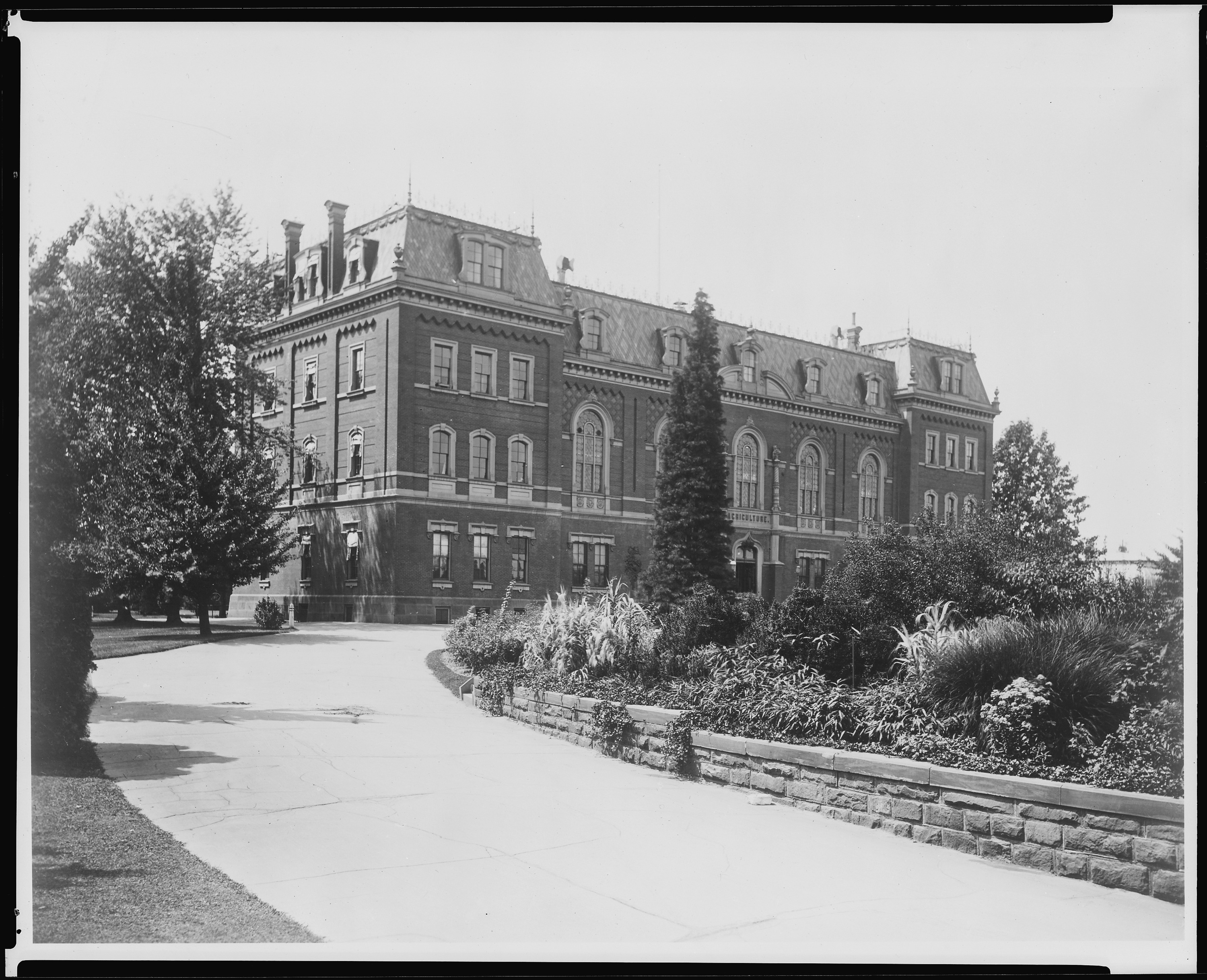
- The USDA Building, c. 1895

- Location within Washington, D.C.

General information
- Status: Demolished
- Type: Government Building
- Location: Between 12th and 14th Street SW, Washington, DC, United States
- Coordinates: 38°53′18″N 77°01′47″W
- Construction started: 1867
- Completed: 1868
- Demolished: 1930

Technical details
- Material: Pressed bricks and sandstone
- Floor count: 2

Design and construction
- Architect: Adolf Cluss

The Department of Agriculture Building was the original headquarters of the United States Department of Agriculture located on the National Mall between 12th and 14th Street SW in Washington, D.C. after its creation in 1862. It was first occupied in 1868. Incompatible with the McMillan Plan, it was demolished in 1930.

== History ==
On May 15, 1862, during the Civil War, Congress approved the creation of the U.S. Department of Agriculture. The President appointed a Commissioner of Agriculture without Cabinet status. President Abraham Lincoln appointed the agriculturalist Isaac Newton to be the first commissioner. A building was needed to house the employees.

On March 20, 1867, the local newspapers announced that the design for the building had been prepared by Adolf Cluss and Mr. Kammerhueber and had been accepted by Commissioner Newton. It was to be constructed on the land of Reservation No. 2 (between 14th and 12th Street SW) between the Washington Memorial Grounds and the Smithsonian Institution on the National Mall. $100,000 had been appropriated the year before by Congress for this project. It was to be 172 feet by 61 1/2 feet, two stories high with a basement and be fire-proof. It would be made of pressed bricks with a sandstone base.

Construction for the new building started on 2 August 1867. On August 16, 1867, it is announced that the excavation of the foundation is complete and that the building should be completed by the Spring of 1868. By June 18, 1868, the building was finished and the interior was being completed. Terracing in the "German Style" was also going to take place in front of the building with over 3,000 different forest and fruit trees to be planted throughout the grounds though it seems the funds had come short by that time and it was hoped that Congress would be able to provide the additional amount. On September 1, 1868, the building was ready to be occupied by the Department moved into the new building.

On the west side of the building a conservatory was built in the same alignment along with other smaller buildings on the south. The areas on the north and south of the building were landscaped into a Victorian garden and arboretum between 1867 and 1879 and crops were being planted on the south side. After the Washington City Canal was filled in 1871, the propagating garden closed. In exchanged, four acres previously used by the canal were acquired.

Exterior view of the building around 1900

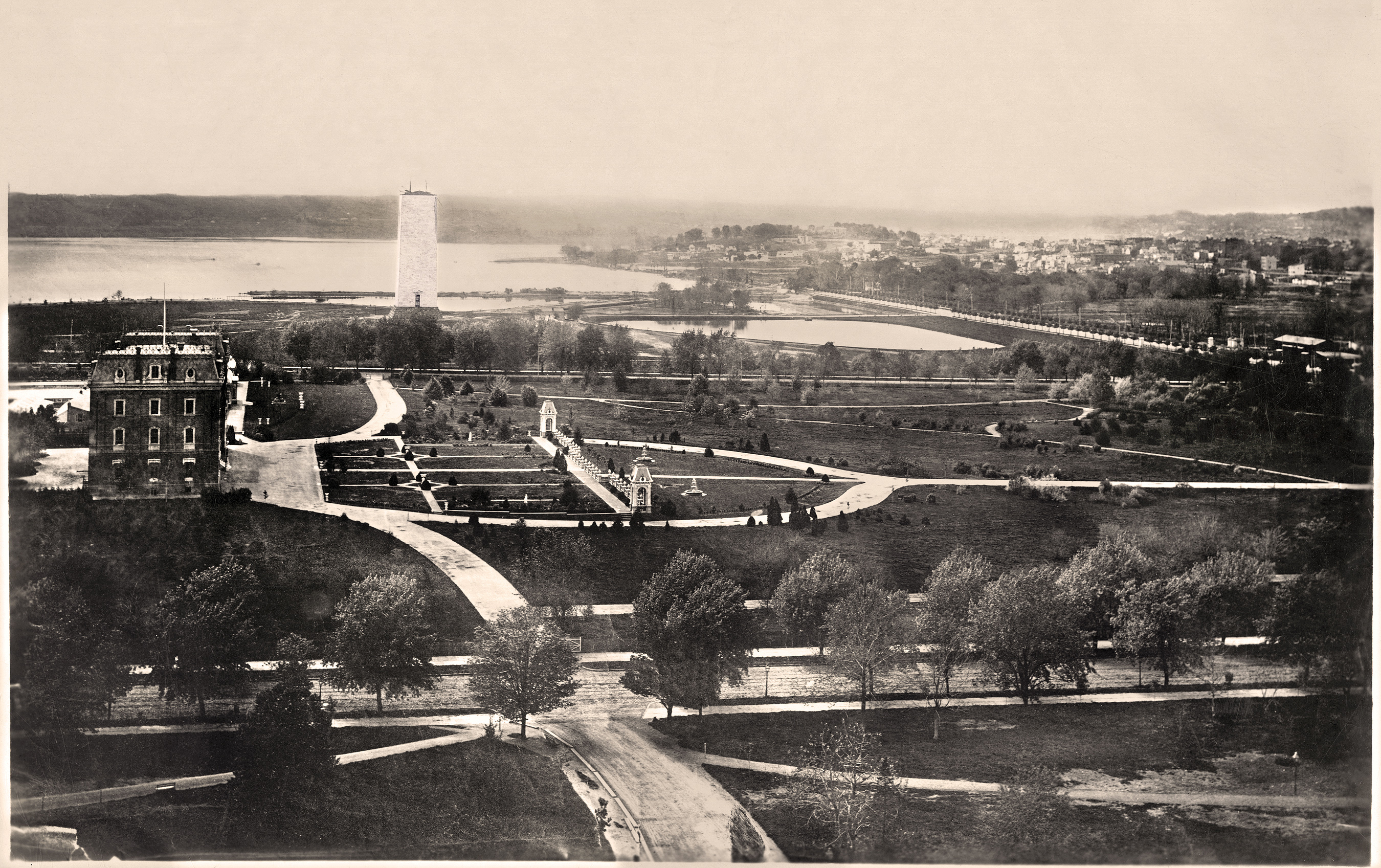
Side view of the building and the gardens. The Washington Memorial is under construction.

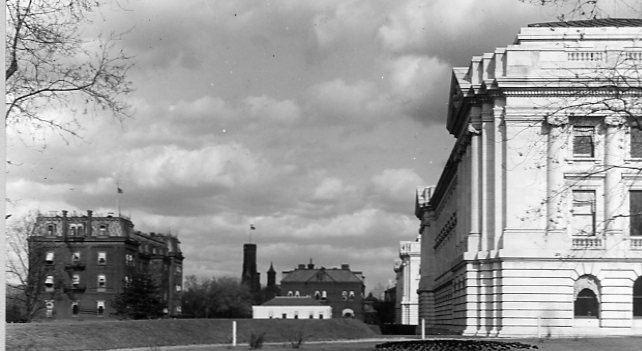
The old building (left) and the new one (right). The Smithsonian Castle tower is visible in the middle.

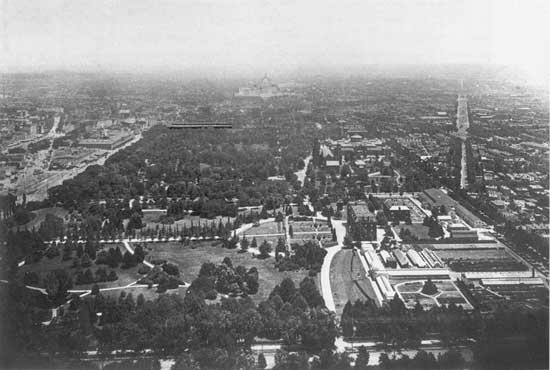
The Department of Agriculture on the Mall around 1901

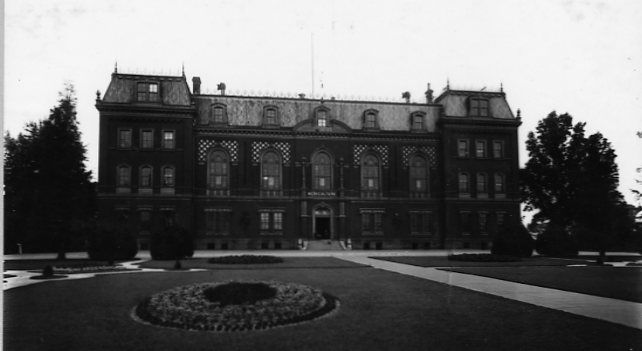
Front view of the building around 1900

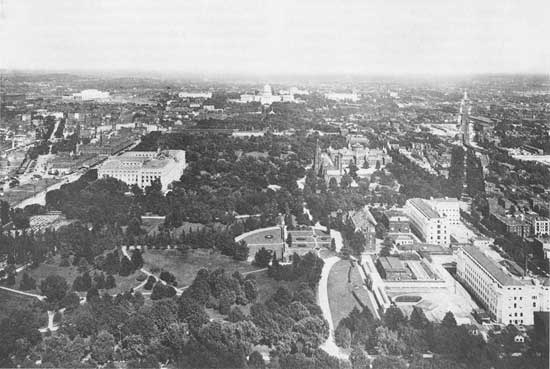
View of the Department of Agriculture around 1908

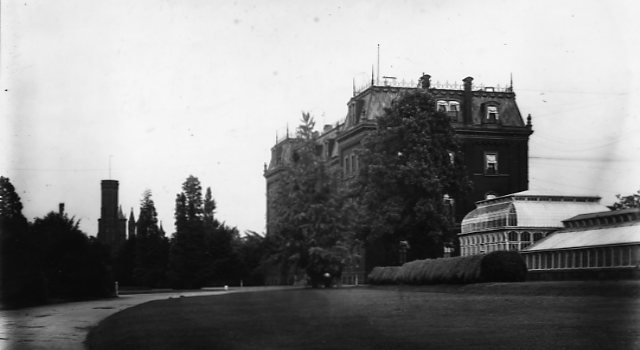
The Building with the Conservatory around 1900

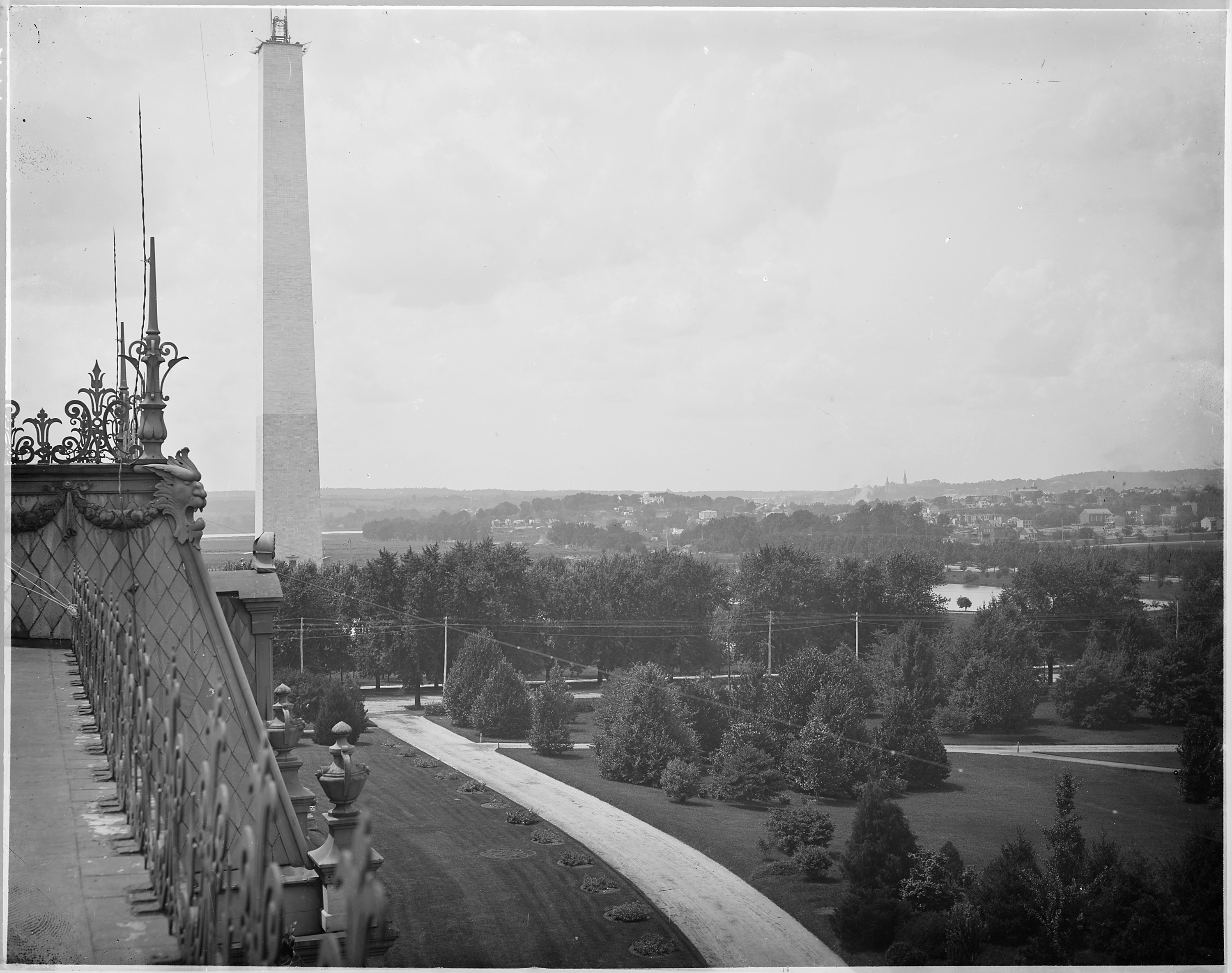
Details of the roofline around 1880. The Washington Memorial is under construction.
