= Amendments to the National Wool Act =

National Wool Act Amendments
- Long title: An Act to amend the National Wool Act of 1954 to reduce the subsidies that wool and mohair producers receive for the 1994 and 1995 marketing years and to eliminate the wool and mohair programs for the 1996 and subsequent marketing years, and for other purposes.
- Nicknames: National Wool Act Amendments of 1993
- Enacted by: the 103rd United States Congress
- Effective: November 1, 1993

Citations
- Public law: 103-130
- Statutes at Large: 107 Stat. 1368

Codification
- Titles amended: 7 U.S.C.: Agriculture
- U.S.C. sections amended: 7 U.S.C. ch. 44 § 1781

Legislative history
- Introduced in the Senate as S. 1548 by Patrick Leahy (D–VT) on October 14, 1993; Committee consideration by Senate Agriculture, Nutrition, and Forestry; Passed the Senate on October 15, 1993 (passed voice vote); Passed the House on October 15, 1993 (passed unanimous consent); Signed into law by President William J. Clinton on November 1, 1993

The Amendments to the National Wool Act Pub. L. 103-130 (selected provisions), 107 Stat. 1368-1369 (1993), signed into law November 1, 1993, phased out wool and mohair price supports at the end of 1995.

== See also ==
National Partnership for Reinventing Government
National Wool Act of 1954
