= Adjusted Gross Revenue Insurance =

Adjusted Gross Revenue Insurance (or AGR Insurance) is a term used in United States federal agricultural law referring to a revenue insurance program implemented in 1999 as a pilot program by the USDA, which continues on a limited basis. It allows some farmers to receive a guarantee of a percentage of their revenue for multiple agricultural products, including some livestock revenue, rather than just the revenue from an individual type of product.

Adjusted Gross Revenue AGR-Lite is similar to the AGR insurance program described above, except that AGR-Lite is available to smaller farmers (income below $512,821 and liability below $250,000). Where the basic AGR program limits eligible livestock coverage to 35% of expected allowable income, AGR-Lite contains no limitations to the proportion of livestock income.
