= Disaster payments =

U.S. agricultural compensation policy

In United States agricultural policy, disaster payments are direct federal payments provided to crop producers when either planting is prevented or crop yields are abnormally low because of adverse weather and related conditions. Between 1988 and 2005, ad hoc disaster legislation was enacted for each crop year, providing a total of nearly $20 billion in direct disaster payments to farmers. These payments were made both to producers with crop insurance and those without insurance.
