= Soil Bank Program =

Former US Federal Government agricultural & land management program

The Soil Bank Program is a federal program (authorized by the Soil Bank Act, P.L. 84-540, Title I) of the late 1950s and early 1960s that paid farmers to retire land from production for 10 years. It was the predecessor to today’s Conservation Reserve Program (CRP). Proposed by President Eisenhower as part of the 1956 Agriculture Act, the original idea was for the government to buy back sub-marginal land that was homesteaded in the late 1800s. This would both extend pastures, forests and watersheds and also reduce the need for the government to support overproduction.

The maximum enrollment was 28,700,000 acres (116,000 km^{2}) in 1960. Some elements in the CRP, such as a limit on CRP acres per county, were a response to the Soil Bank experience.
