= Agricultural Act of 1956 =

United States federal law

- Long title: An Act to enact the Agricultural Act of 1956
- Nicknames: Soil Bank Act
- Enacted by: the 84th United States Congress
- Effective: May 28, 1956

Citations
- Public law: 84-540
- Statutes at Large: 70 Stat. 188

Codification
- Titles amended: 7 U.S.C.: Agriculture
- U.S.C. sections created: 7 U.S.C. ch. 45 § 1801
- U.S.C. sections amended: 7 U.S.C. ch. 35 § 1281

Legislative history
- Introduced in the House as H.R. 10875; Passed the House on May 3, 1956 (314-78); Passed the Senate on May 18, 1956 (49-22); Reported by the joint conference committee on May 23, 1956; agreed to by the House on May 23, 1956 (305-59) and by the Senate on May 23, 1956 (agreed/passed); Signed into law by President Dwight D. Eisenhower on May 28, 1956

The Agricultural Act of 1956 (P.L. 84-540) created the Soil Bank Program (Title I was called the Soil Bank Act), addressed the disposal of Commodity Credit Corporation (CCC) inventories of surplus stocks, contained commodity support program provisions, and contained forestry provisions. The Soil Bank Act authorized short- and long-term removal of land from production with annual rental payments to participants (Acreage Reserve Program and Conservation Reserve Program, respectively). The Acreage Reserve Program, for wheat, corn, rice, cotton, peanuts, and several types of tobacco, allowed producers to retire land on an annual basis in crop years 1956 through 1959 in return for payments. The Conservation Reserve Program allowed producers to retire cropland under contracts of 3, 5, or 10 years in return for annual payments. The Soil Bank Act was repealed by Section 601 of the Food and Agriculture Act of 1965 (P.L. 89-321). The Conservation Reserve portion of the Soil Bank was a model for the subsequent Conservation Reserve Program (CRP), enacted in 1985.
