= Marketing year =

A marketing year is a period of one year (or sometimes less), designated for reporting and (or) analysis of production, marketing and disposition of a commodity. (Disposition of an agricultural crop might include such uses as food, animal feed, industry, seed, and export, as well as changes in stocks.) Because of year-to-year fluctuations in production, much marketing and disposition of some commodities may reflect production that occurred during a previous calendar year. For this reason, analysis is often facilitated if the marketing year for a crop commences at about the time of harvest. However, world markets or other factors may also influence choice of beginning date for the marketing year for some commodities in some countries. Especially in the case of certain perishable fresh fruits and vegetables, the marketing year may be less than a full year in length, because economic activity of interest for reporting and analysis may be concluded within just a few months.

== Crop marketing years in various nations ==
Wheat – The marketing year commences April 1 for Japan, June 1 for the United States, July 1 for the European Union and New Zealand, August 1 for Canada and October 1 for Australia.

Coarse grains - The marketing year commences April 1 for Japan, July 1 for the European Union and New Zealand, August 1 for Canada and October 1 for Australia. The US marketing year commences June 1 for barley and oats and September 1 for corn (maize) for grain and sorghum for grain.

Oilseed – The marketing year commences April 1 for Japan, July 1 for the European Union and New Zealand, August 1 for Canada and October 1 for Australia. The US marketing year begins June 1 for canola (rapeseed), and September 1 for soybeans and sunflower seed.

Rice – The marketing year commences April 1 for Japan and Australia, August 1 for the United States, September 1 for the European Union, October 1 for Mexico, November 1 for Korea and January 1 for other countries.

== Commodity marketing years in the United States ==
For the following commodities, the United States marketing year is a full year, commencing on the date indicated:

January 1: cattle, sheep, lambs, wool, mohair, milk, turkeys, honey, cauliflower, celery, lettuce, onions, strawberries, sweet corn, tomatoes

May 1 hay

June 1: barley, oats, wheat

July 1: canola, flax seed, apples (fresh)

August 1: cotton, peanuts, rice

September 1: corn for grain, sorghum for grain, soybeans, sweet potatoes, hops

December 1: broilers, eggs, hogs.

For some of the above commodities, the marketing year in some US states differs from that for the US as whole. For several other commodities, notably some perishable fruits and vegetables and some tobacco categories, the marketing year for the US and (or) for various US states is less than a 12-month period.
