= Agricultural Act of 1970 =

United States federal law

- Long title: An Act to establish improved programs for the benefit of producers and consumers of dairy products, wool, wheat, feed grains, cotton, and other commodities, to extend the Agricultural Trade Development and Assistance Act of 1954, as amended, and for other purposes.
- Enacted by: the 91st United States Congress
- Effective: November 30, 1970

Citations
- Public law: 91-524
- Statutes at Large: 84 Stat. 1358

Codification
- Titles amended: 7 U.S.C.: Agriculture
- U.S.C. sections amended: Chapter 26 § 601

Legislative history
- Introduced in the House as H.R. 18546; Passed the House on August 5, 1970 (212-171); Passed the Senate on September 15, 1970 (65-7); Reported by the joint conference committee on October 13, 1970; agreed to by the House on October 13, 1970 (191-145) and by the Senate on November 19, 1970 (48-35); Signed into law by President Richard M. Nixon on November 30, 1970

In United States federal agriculture legislation, the Agricultural Act of 1970 (P.L. 91-524) initiated a significant change in commodity support policy.

This 3-year farm bill replaced some of the more restrictive and mandatory features of previous law (acreage allotments, planting restrictions, and marketing quotas) with voluntary annual cropland set-asides and marketing certificate payments to achieve parity prices (the precursor to target prices and deficiency payments). For the first time, the law adopted an annual payment limitation per producer (set at $55,000 per crop). Among other things, the Act also amended and extended the authority of the Class I differential in federal milk marketing order areas.
