= Food and Agriculture Act of 1965 =

United States federal law

- Long title: An Act to maintain farm income, to stabilize prices and assure adequate supplies of agricultural commodities, to reduce surpluses, lower Government costs and promote foreign trade, to afford greater economic opportunity in rural areas, and for other purposes.
- Enacted by: the 89th United States Congress
- Effective: November 4, 1965

Citations
- Public law: 89-321
- Statutes at Large: 79 Stat. 1187

Codification
- Titles amended: 7 U.S.C.: Agriculture
- U.S.C. sections amended: 7 U.S.C. ch. 26 § 601

Legislative history
- Introduced in the House as H.R. 9811; Passed the House on August 19, 1965 (221-172); Passed the Senate on September 14, 1965 (72-22); Reported by the joint conference committee on October 8, 1965; agreed to by the House on October 8, 1965 (219-150) and by the Senate on October 8, 1965 (passed); Signed into law by President Lyndon B. Johnson on November 4, 1965

The Food and Agriculture Act of 1965 (Pub. L. 89-321, 79 Stat. 1187), the first multiyear farm legislation, provided for four year commodity programs for wheat, feed grains, and upland cotton. It was extended for one more year through 1970 (P.L. 90 559). It authorized a Class I milk base plan for the 75 federal milk marketing orders, as well as a long term diversion of cropland under a Cropland Adjustment Program. It also continued payment and diversion programs for feed grains and cotton, and marketing certificate and diversion programs for wheat.
