= Agricultural Act of 1954 =

United States federal law

- Long title: An Act to provide for greater stability in agriculture; to augment the marketing and disposal of agricultural products; and for other purposes.
- Nicknames: National Wool Act of 1954
- Enacted by: the 83rd United States Congress
- Effective: August 28, 1954

Citations
- Public law: 83-690
- Statutes at Large: 68 Stat. 897

Codification
- Titles amended: 7 U.S.C.: Agriculture
- U.S.C. sections amended: Chapter 35a § 1421; Chapter 44 § 1781

Legislative history
- Introduced in the House as H.R. 9680; Passed the House on July 2, 1954 (228-170); Reported by the joint conference committee on August 17, 1954; agreed to by the Senate on August 17, 1954 (44-28) and by the House on August 17, 1954 (agreed/passed); Signed into law by President Dwight D. Eisenhower on August 28, 1954

The Agricultural Act of 1954 (P.L. 83-690) is a United States federal law that, among other provisions, authorized a Commodity Credit Corporation reserve for foreign and domestic relief.

The Act established a flexible price support for basic commodities (excluding tobacco) at 82.5-90% of parity and authorized a Commodity Credit Corporation (CCC) reserve for foreign and domestic relief. Title VII was designated the National Wool Act of 1954 and provided for a new price support program for wool and mohair to encourage increased domestic production. Price support for wool and mohair continued through marketing year 1995, at which time it was phased down and terminated under the explicit mandate of P.L. 103-130 (November 1, 1993). Mandatory support for wool and mohair was restored by the 2002 farm bill (P.L. 101–171, Sec. 1201–1205).

This Act is separate from, and should not be confused with, the Agricultural Trade Development and Assistance Act of 1954.
