= Agricultural Act of 1949 =

United States federal law

- Long title: An Act to stabilize prices of agricultural commodities.
- Enacted by: the 81st United States Congress
- Effective: October 31, 1949

Citations
- Public law: Pub. L. 81–439
- Statutes at Large: 63 Stat. 1051

Codification
- Titles amended: 7 U.S.C.: Agriculture
- U.S.C. sections amended: Chapter 35a § 1431

Legislative history
- Introduced in the House as H.R. 5345; Passed the House on July 21, 1949 (384-25); Reported by the joint conference committee on October 19, 1949; agreed to by the Senate on October 19, 1949 (46-7) and by the House on October 19, 1949 (passed); Signed into law by President Harry S. Truman on October 31, 1949

The Agricultural Act of 1949 (Pub. L. 81–439) is a United States federal law (7 U.S.C. 1431) that is known as the "permanent legislation" of U.S. agricultural policy and is, in its amended form, still in effect. The Act was enacted on October 31, 1949. The purpose of the act is "To provide assistance to the States in the establishment, maintenance, operation, and expansion of school-lunch programs, and for other purposes."

== Section 416(b) ==
Section 416 (b) of the 1949 Agriculture Act provides for the first time permanent legal basis by which surplus food can be donated to friendly overseas countries as development aid. This is a principal means, still in use today by which surplus food can be donated to friendly countries directly to the recipient national government or to an agreed NGO (PVO) or international body such as WFP to execute the program on behalf of USDA and the host government.

Donation of surplus commodities owned by the Commodity Credit Corporation (CCC) to developing nations and friendly countries. Donated food must not affect existing food programs or normal commercial sales.

CCC is the US government agency which purchases the surplus food from the market. Food can either be used directly or be monetized in the recipient country's market. Money gained from the sale can be then put to use on a pre-agreed program.

The type of surplus food can vary, but what is available will depend on the last year's harvest in the US.

Typical donations include these:

- Wheat (varieties of wheat such as DRS, HRW, SWW, and a type of ready-to-eat mix of wheat-soy blend)
- Corn, corn soy blend, instant corn soy milk, corn meal, etc.
- Flour (all-purpose flour, bread flour, wheat flour etc.)
- Milk powder, peas, beans and lentils
- Rice
- Soy bean
- Tallow
- Vegetable oil
- Wood
- Canned pink salmon
- Fameal
