= State technical committee =

State technical committees are advisory groups to state conservationists (coordinators of all Natural Resources Conservation Service activities within a state) created in the 1990 farm bill and amended in the 1996 farm bill. These groups can include representatives from agencies, agriculture, agribusiness, and non-profits, as well as individuals with a demonstrated expertise. Responsibilities assigned by the 1996 farm bill include establishing procedures for evaluating petitions on new conservation practices and identifying priority areas for the Environmental Quality Incentive Program (EQIP) and Wetland Reserve Program (WRP).
