= Muddy flood =

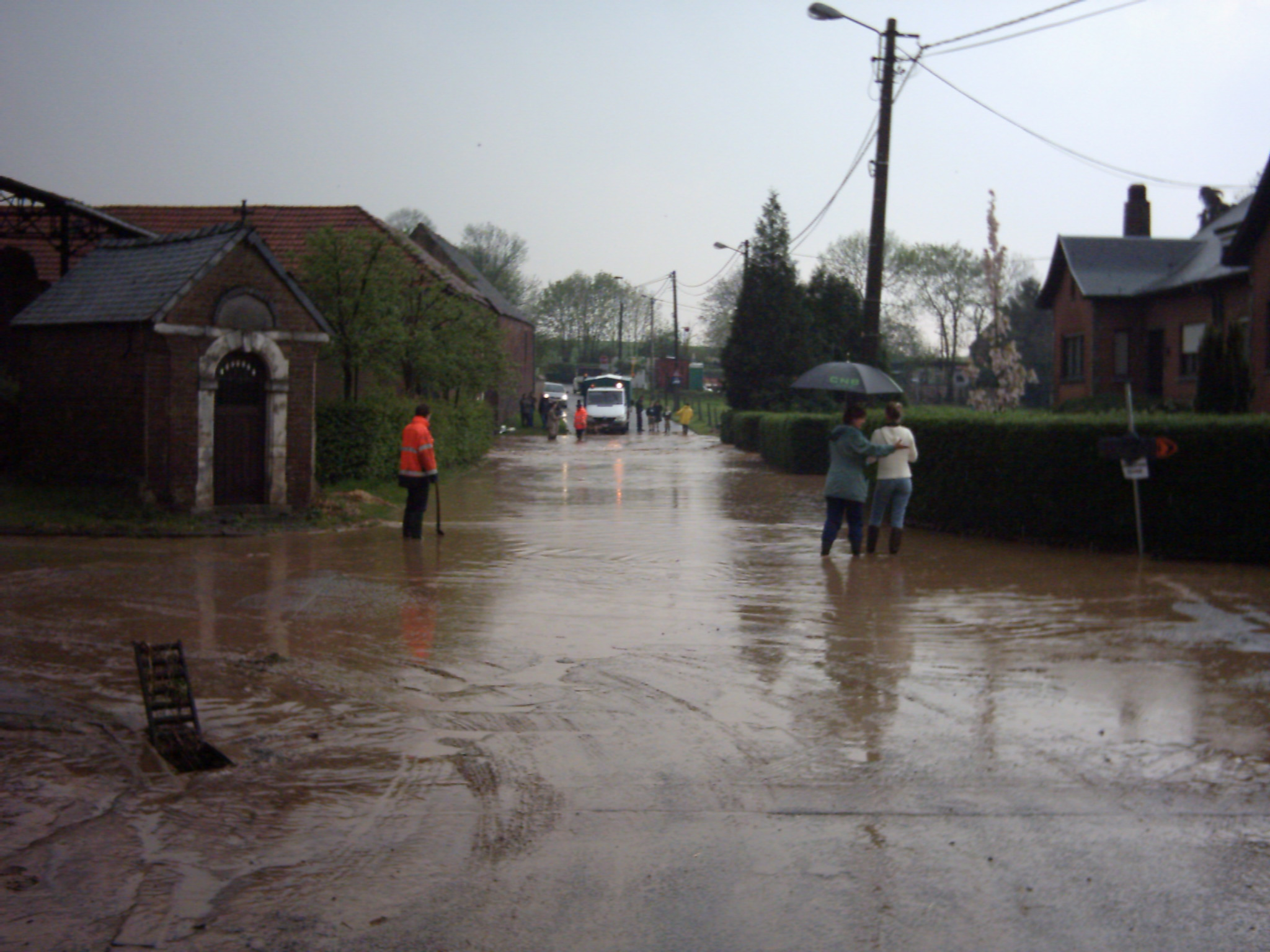
Muddy flood occurring in Chaumont-Gistoux, Belgium

A muddy flood is produced by an accumulation of run-off over agricultural land. Sediments are picked up by the run-off and carried as suspended matter or bed-load. Muddy floods are typically a hill-slope process, and should not be confused with mudflows produced by mass movements.

Muddy floods can damage the road infrastructure and may deposit layers of mud blanket and may also clog sewers and damage private property.

It has been referred to 'muddy floods' since the 1980s. A similar designation appeared in French ('inondations boueuses') during the same period.

== Generation ==
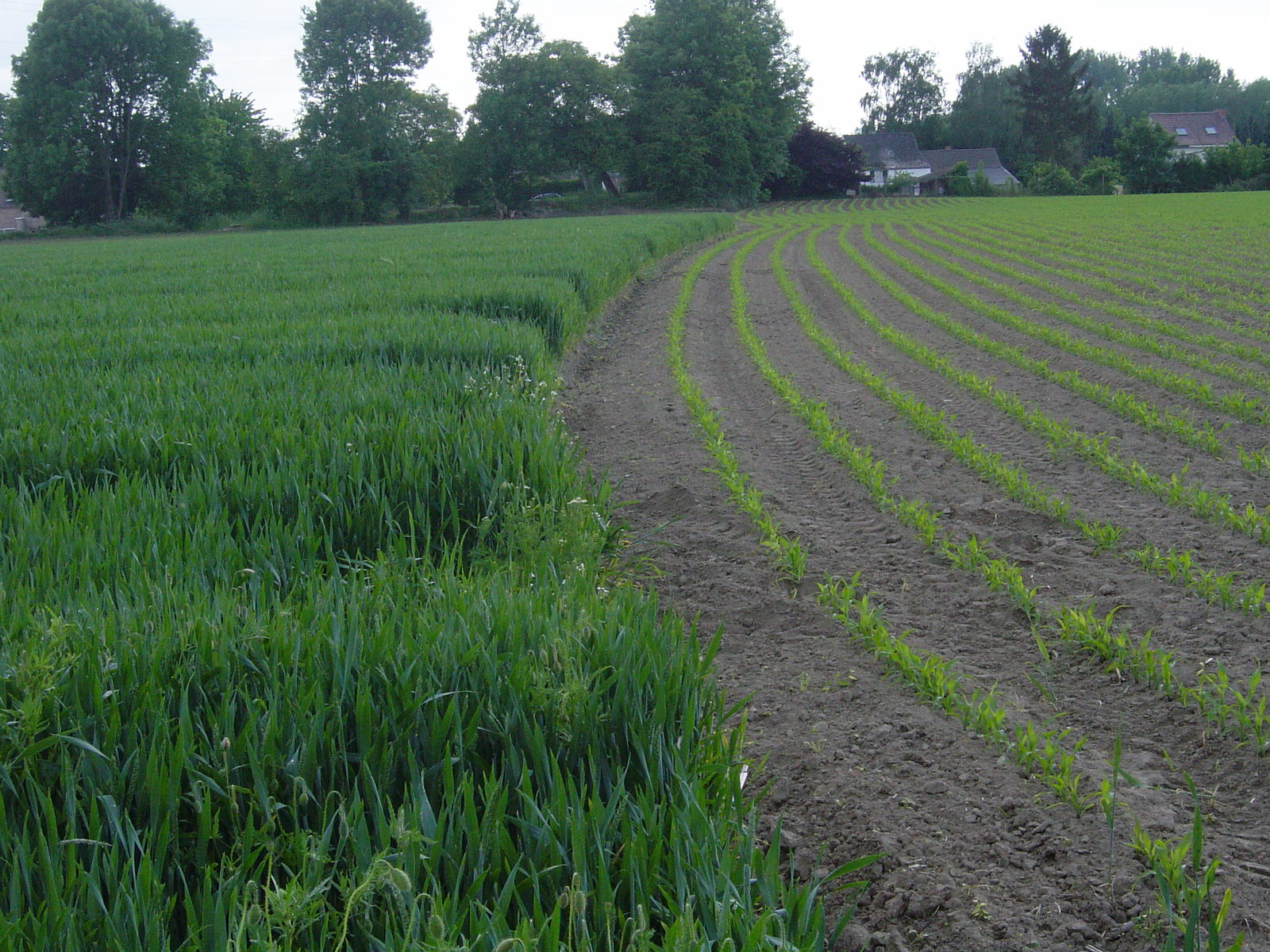
Difference of soil cover by vegetation for two crops (winter wheat vs. maize) at the end of May, in central Belgium

Muddy runoff is generated on agricultural land when the soil surface is exposed or sparsely covered by vegetation. Large quantities of run-off usually generated by heavy storms is needed to start such a flood.

== Occurrence ==
Muddy floods have been observed in the entire European loess belt. Other affected areas include Normandy and Picardy (France), central Belgium and southern Limburg, the Netherlands.

Muddy floods have also been observed in Slovakia and Poland.

== Temporal evolution ==
An increase in muddy flood frequency has been observed during the last twenty years (e.g. in central Belgium,). This increase in their frequency may be due to a number of factors including:

- Change in agricultural practices that leave field bare of crops in the autumn and winter
- A shift to crops that are more sensitive to soil erosion
- land consolidation (enlargement of fields, removal of landscape buffer elements such as hedges
- construction of new houses, upstream of cropland increasing run-off volumes and intensity
- increased frequency of heavy rainfall

== Control measures ==
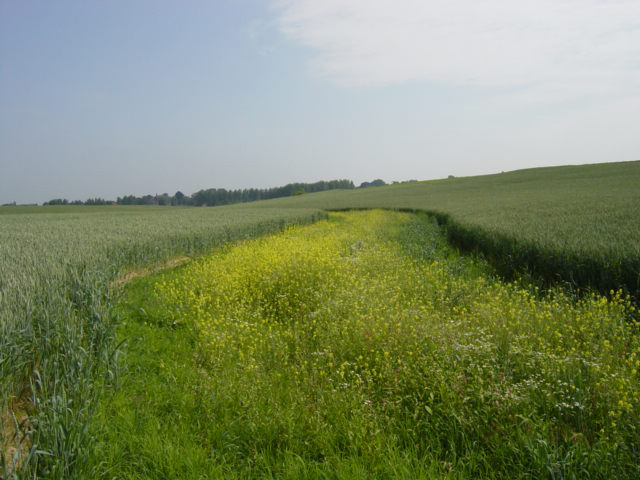
Grassed waterway during a beautiful day in Velm, Belgium

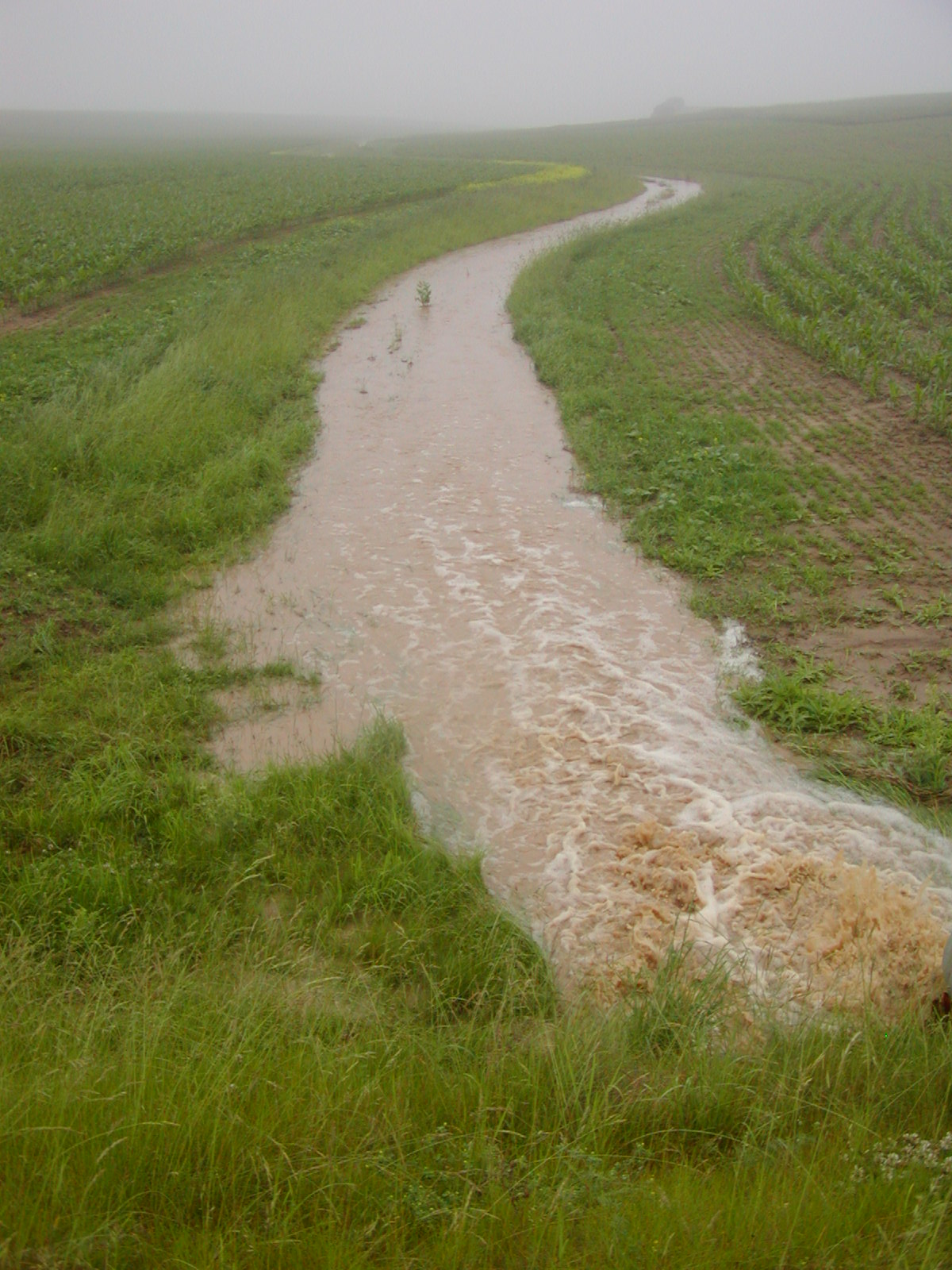
Grassed waterway in Velm, Belgium, after a thunderstorm

Preventive measures consist in limiting runoff generation and sediment production at the source. Alternative farming practices (e.g. reduced tillage) to increase runoff infiltration and limit erosion in their fields may assist.

Curative measures generally consist in installing retention ponds at the boundary between cropland and inhabited areas.

An alternative is to apply other measures than can be referred to as intermediate measures. Grass buffer strips along or within fields, a grassed waterway (in the thalwegs of dry valleys) or earthen dams are good examples of this type of measures. They act as a buffer within landscape, retaining runoff temporarily and trapping sediments.

Implementation of these measures is best coordinated at the catchment scale.

== See also ==
- November 2010 European Windstorms
