= Restoration Cost-sharing Agreements =

In the United States, Restoration Cost-sharing Agreements are an enrollment option of less than 30 years under the Wetland Reserve Program. It is the shortest term enrollment option for this program, and pays participants the lowest amount per acre.
