= Pesticide Recordkeeping Program =

The Pesticide Recordkeeping Program (PRP), authorized by the 1990 farm bill (P.L. 101–624, Sec. 1491), requires that private pesticide applicators keep records of the pesticides they use in agricultural production and that the records be surveyed to provide a database on restricted-use pesticides.
