= Frothar =

Frothar or Frotar (Latin Frotharius, French Frotaire) is a Frankish given name and may refer to:

- Frothar of Toul, bishop of Toul c. 813 – 847
- Frothar (archbishop of Bordeaux) (before 859 – after 893)
- Frotaire I, bishop of Nîmes 987 – 1016
- Frotaire II, 11th century bishop of Nîmes
