= Haying and grazing rules =

Haying and grazing rules in response to natural disaster conditions

In United States agricultural policy, the haying and grazing rules dictate that in response to natural disaster conditions (usually a drought), Conservation Reserve Program land can be used for haying and grazing, but only after the Secretary approves it for the entire county. CRP participants who then choose to hay or graze receive reduced financial payments, reflecting the decreased environmental benefits being provided on enrolled lands.
