= Trifsorich =

Trifsorich or Trisorik of Toul (died 532) was the 9th bishop of Toul. Trifsorich succeeded Albaud of Toul in 525, but very little is known about him.

== Biography ==
When Theuderic I, king of Austrasia and son of Clovis I, ordered a special tax to be levied on all cities of his states, the bishop Trifsorich, aware that Toul would be unable to produce the sum demanded, as recent wars had exhausted its resources, resolved to ask the king for relief. He therefore sent to him one of his deacons, who so eloquently explained the position of the city that the king waived its entire contribution.

Trifsorich died in 532 and was buried at the Abbey of St. Evre, Toul. His successor was Dulcitius.
