= October 1 (Eastern Orthodox liturgics) =

Day in the Eastern Orthodox liturgical calendar

Eastern Orthodox liturgical calendar
September 30	October 1	October 2
October 1 O.S. ≍ October 14 N.S. October 1 N.S ≍ September 18 O.S.

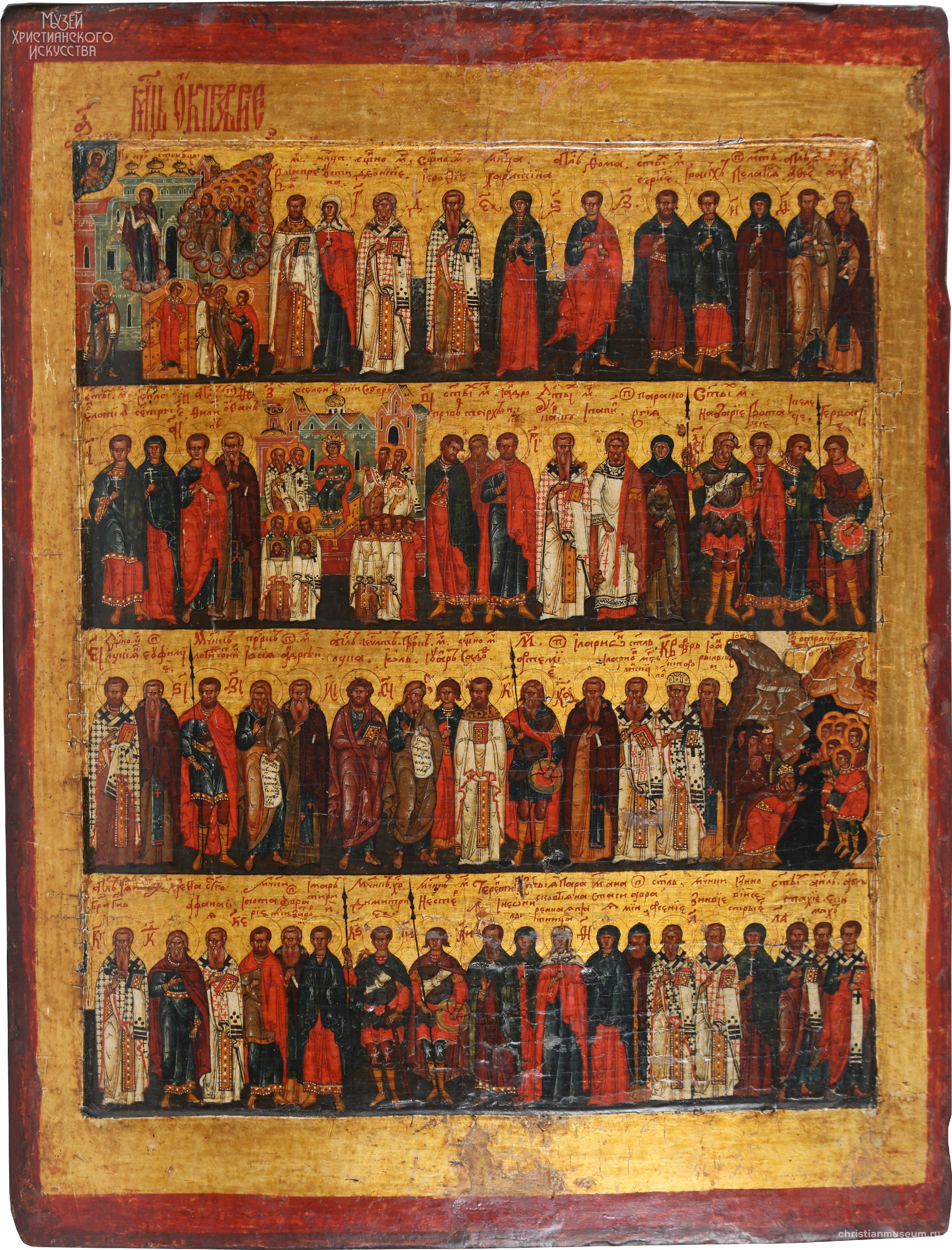
Menaion Calendar icon - October: one day = one saint.

October 1 in Eastern Orthodox liturgical calendars is a feast day and a day of commemoration of saints and martyrs. Although some Orthodox churches use the Revised Julian Calendar and others use the traditional Julian calendar, the fixed commemorations for their respective October 1 are broadly the same, no matter which calendar is used. (Note: Despite the dates being the same, the days to which they refer typically differ by 13 days. The notation Old Style or O.S. is sometimes used to indicate a date in the traditional Julian Calendar (the "Old Calendar"). The notation New Style or N.S. indicates a date in the Revised Julian calendar (the "New Calendar").)

== Feasts ==
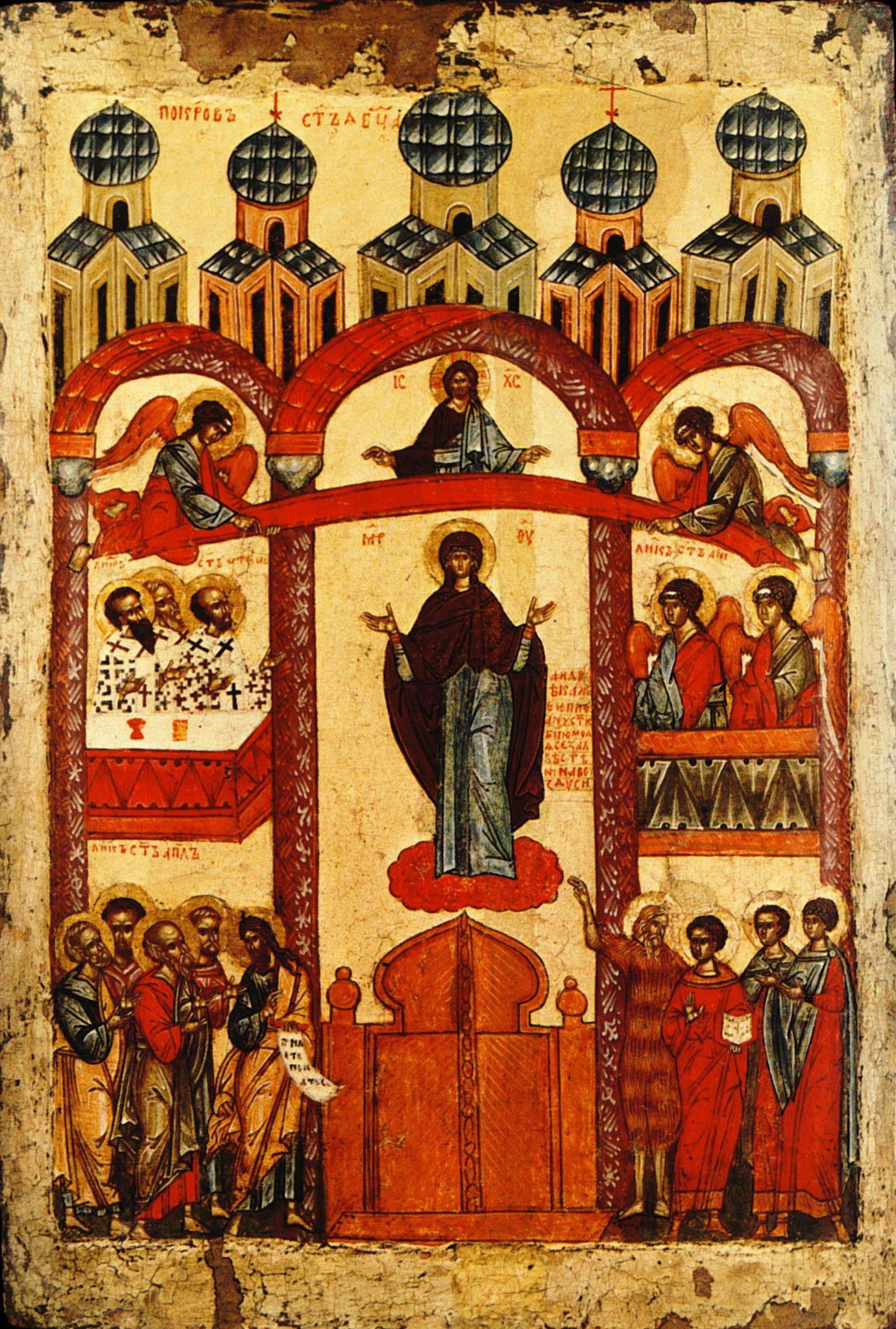
The Protection of Our Most Holy Lady Theotokos. (Novgorod Icon, 1401-1425).

- The Protection of Our Most Holy Lady Theotokos and Ever-Virgin Mary, at the Blachernae church in Constantinople (911) (Note: "This is a great feast-day in Ukraine and commemorates several events during which the Mother of God appeared over embattled cities to save them with her Mantle of Protection (e.g. Pochaiv in 1675).") (see also: October 28 - Greek Orthodox Church)

== Saints ==
- Saint Ananias of Damascus, Bishop and one of the Seventy Apostles (1st century)
- Martyr Domninus of Thessalonica (4th century) (Note: "At Thessalonica, St. Domninus, martyr, under the same Maximian.")
- Ezana of Axum, king of Ethiopia (4th century).
- King Mirian III of Iberia (c. 361) and Queen Nana of Mtskheta (c. 364) - Equals-of-the-Apostles, St. Abiathar of Mtskheta, and St. Sidonia, disciple of St. Nina (4th century)
- Venerable Romanos the Melodist, "Sweet-singer" (c. 556)
- Monk-Martyrs Michael, Abbot of Zovia Monastery near Sebaste, and 36 fathers with him (c. 790) (see also: October 2)
- Venerable Melchizedek I, Catholicos-Patriarch of Georgia (c. 1030)

== Pre-Schism Western saints ==
- Saint Piatus of Tournai, he enlightened the areas around Tournai in Belgium and Chartres in France (c. 286) (Note: "At Tournay, St. Piaton, priest and martyr, who, with blessed Quinctinus and his companions, went from Rome to Gaul to preach the faith, and afterwards, in the persecution of Maximian, having consummated his martyrdom, passed from earth to heaven.") (Note: "SAINT PIATUS, it is pretended, was a native of Beneventum, who went to Gaul with S. Dionysius of Paris, and preached in the region near Lille and Tournay. He was attacked by the barbarians and killed. The body was found by S. Eligius at Seclin where he was martyred, and translated in the 9th century to S. Omer, thence to Chartres, and then to Tournay. The relics were shown in 1143 at Seclin; the Chartres people, however, showed the entire body in their cathedral, and disputed its translation from Chartres to Tournay. Each entire body has established its authenticity by miracles; that at Chartres, however, disappeared at the Revolution.")
- Martyrs Verissimus, Maxima and Julia, in Portugal under Diocletian (c. 302) (Note: "At Lisbon, in Portugal, the holy martyrs Verissimus, and his sisters, Maxima and Julia, who suffered in the persecution of Diocletian." They have a full Mozarabic service.)
- Martyrs Aretas, and five-hundred-and-four other martyrs, at Rome. (Note: "At Rome, blessed Aretas and five hundred and four other martyrs.")
- Saint Aladius (Albaud), Bishop of Toul in France. (c. 520)
- Saint Wasnulf (died c. 650), missionary in Condé-sur-l'Escaut in Hainaut, Austrasia.
- Saint Bavo of Ghent, penitent and hermit, confessor and patron of Haarlem in the Netherlands (659) (Note: "Aldowin, commonly called Bavo, was Count of Hesbain, married to the daughter of Count Adilio, and by her became the father of S. Adeltrude. He lived a careless, merry life till the death of his wife, when he felt her loss so keenly, that the world and its pleasures became bitter to his taste; then in a fit of sorrow he went to S. Amandus and asked him his advice. Amandus advised him to distribute his goods among the poor, and build a church and monastery to S. Peter at Ghent. Wherever Amandus went preaching Bavo followed, eager to hear the Word of God. The seed sank deep into his heart and bare fruit in an altered life. He returned to Ghent and became a recluse in the monastery he had erected there, and there he died in the odour of sanctity.")
- Saint Dodo, Abbot of Wallers-en-Faigne (750)
- Saint Fidharleus, restorer of the monastery of Rathin in Ireland (762)
- Martyr-prince Mylor of Brittany (Melorius). (Note: "MELORIUS, whose name is also written MELIORUS, was venerated with great devotion in the Abbey Church of Amesbury. It appears that he was an early Martyr, and of the ancient British race, but we have no authentic record of his Acts. It is said that he was the son of a prince of Cornwall and one of the first converts to the Christian Faith, on which account he was put to a cruel death by his father; that he was buried in Cornwall, and afterwards translated to Amesbury.")
- Saint Virila, Abbot of the Monastery of the Saviour in Leyre in Spain (c. 1000)

== Post-Schism Orthodox saints ==
- Saint Gregory the Singer of the Great Lavra of Mount Athos (Gregory Domesticus) (1355)
- Saint John Kukuzelis of Mount Athos (1360)
- Venerable Sabbas, abbot of Vishera in Novgorod, the Wonderworker (1460)

=== New Martys and Confessors ===
- New Hieromartyr Alexis Stavrovsky, priest (1918)
- New Hieromartyr Michael (Vologodsky), priest of Krasnoyarsk (1920).
- New Hieromartyr George (Archangelsky), priest (1937) (Note: For his biography see: (in Russian) Октября 1 (14). Священномученик Георгий (Архангельский). (.pdf): Дамаскин (Орловский), игумен. Мученики, исповедники и подвижники благочестия Русской Православной Церкви XX столетия. Кн. 6. Тверь, 2002.)
- New Hieromartyrs Alexander Agafonikov, Gregory, Nicholas Kuligin, priests (1937)
- Martyr John Artemov (1937)
- New Hieromartyr Archpriest Ismael (Rozhdestvensky) of Strelna, St. Petersburg (1938)
- New Hieromartyr Theodore (1940)

== Other commemorations ==
- Commemoration of the Apparition of the Pillar over the Robe of the Lord at Mtskheta, Georgia (c. 330)
- Translation of the relics of Saint Remigius of Rheims, Apostle to the Franks (533) (Note: "AT Rheims, in France, St. Remigius, bishop confessor, who converted the Franks to Christ, regenerated Clovis, their king, in the sacred font of baptism and instructed him in the mysteries of . faith. After he had been many years bishop, and had distinguished himself by his sanctity and the power of working miracles, he departed this life on the 13th of January. His festival, however, is kept on this day, when his sacred body was translated.") (see also: January 13)
- Synaxis of the Most-Holy Theotokos Gorgoepikoos ("She who is quick to hear"), at the Dochiariou monastery on Mount Athos (1664)
- Synaxis of the Saints of Moldova. (Note: See: (in Russian) Собор Молдавских святых. Википедии. (Russian Wikipedia).)
- Repose of Hiero-schemamonk Euthemius of Valaam (1829)

=== Icons ===
- Icon of the Most Holy Theotokos “Pokrov” (Pskov-Protection Icon of the Most Holy Theotokos) (1581)
- Icon of the Theotokos of Brayiliv-Pochaiv (Brailovska) at Brayiliv near Vinnitsa.
- Icon of the Most Holy Theotokos Lublin (Liublinsk)
- Transfer of the Terebovlya Icon of the Most Holy Mother of God from Terebovlya to Lvov (1672)
- Icon of the Mother of God of Gerbovets (Herbovetska) (1790, 1859)
- Icon of the Mother of God of Kasperov (Kasperivska), defended the city of Odessa during the Crimean War (1853-1855)
- Icon of the Mother of God of Barsk (Barska) (1887)
- Icon of the Mother of God “Eleutherotrias” (Deliveress) (1889) (see also: October 17, October 28 and April 4)

== Icon gallery ==
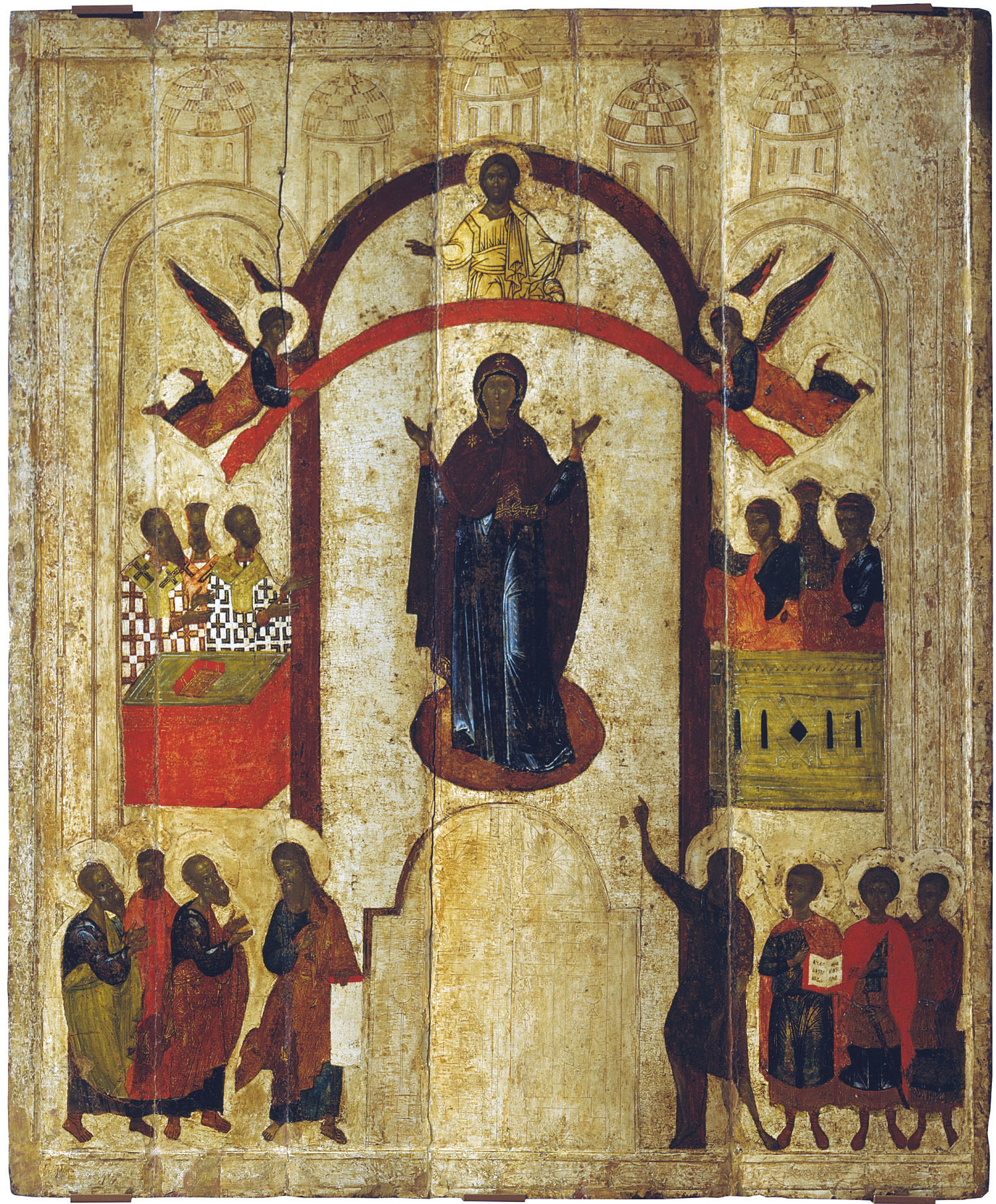
The Protection of Our Most Holy Lady Theotokos and Ever-Virgin Mary.

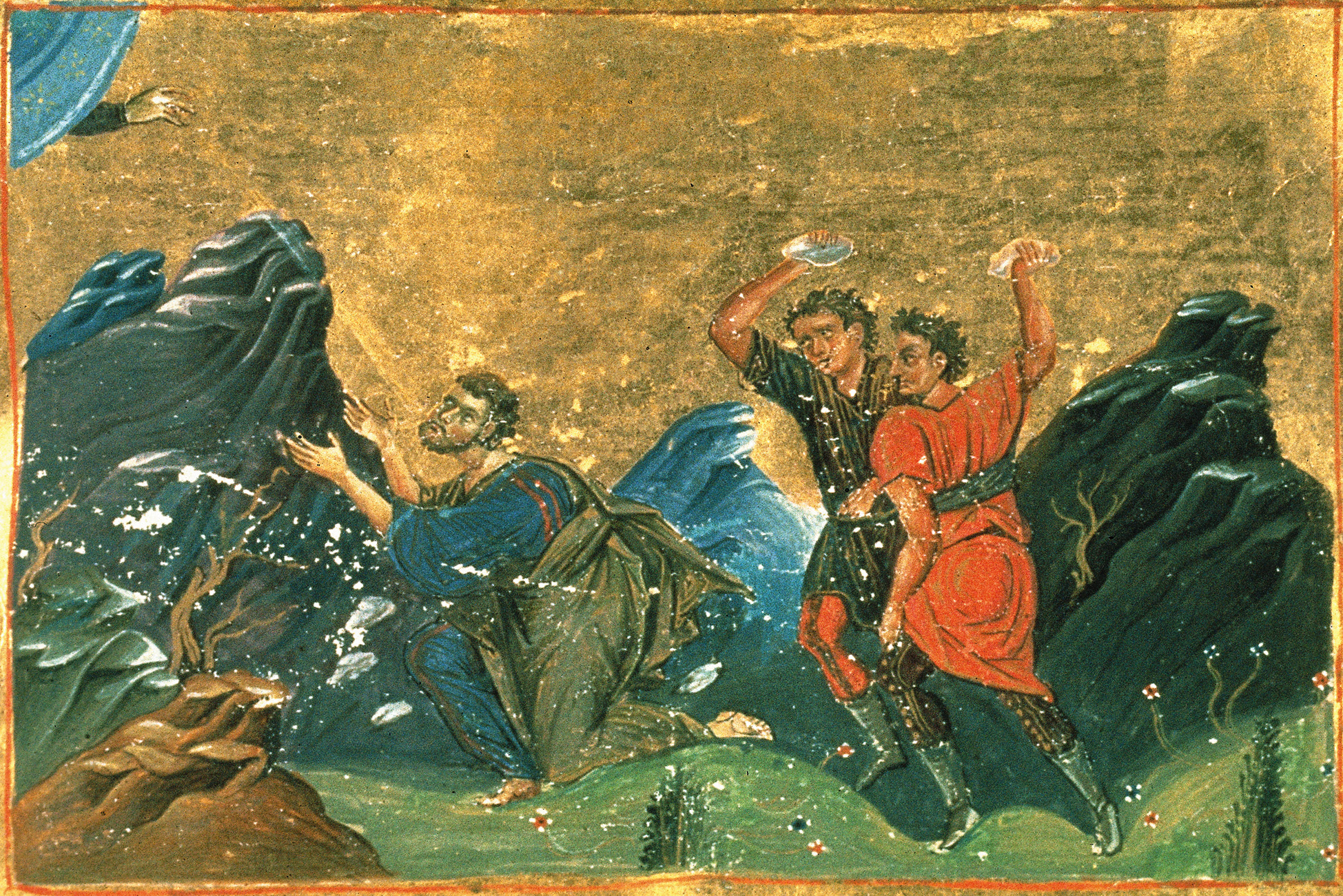
Martyrdom of Saint Ananias of Damascus.
(Menologion of Basil II, 10th century).

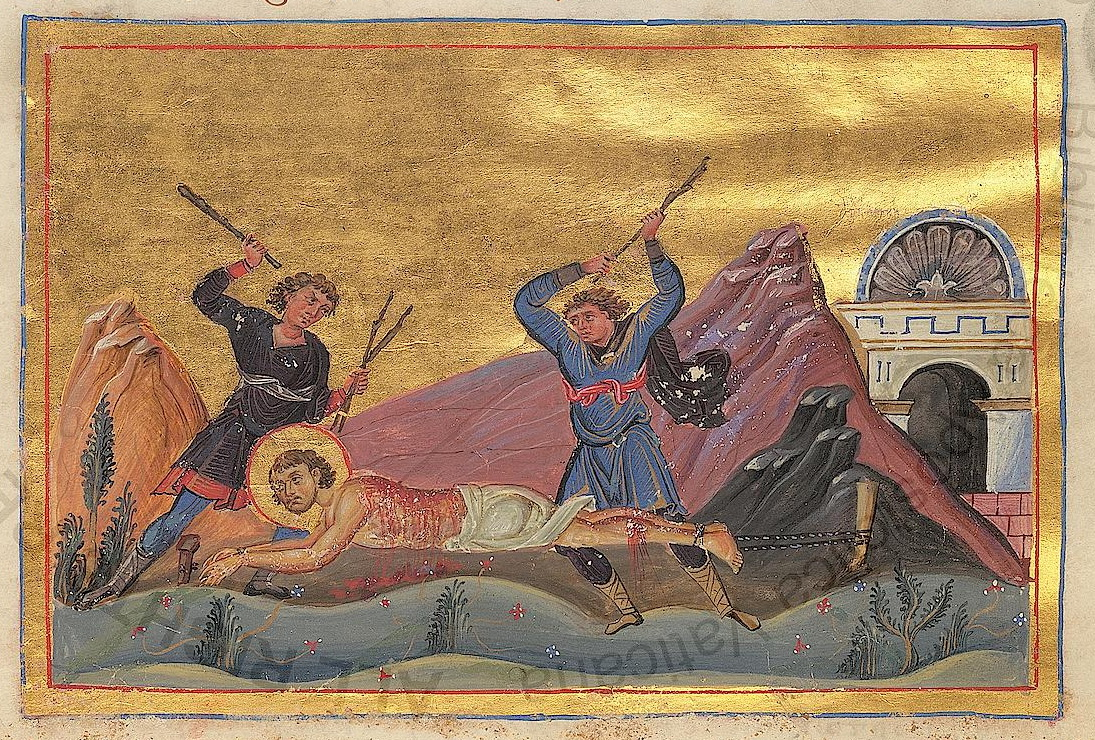
Martyr Domninus of Thessaloniki.
(Menologion of Basil II, 10th century).

Martyr Domninus of Thessaloniki.

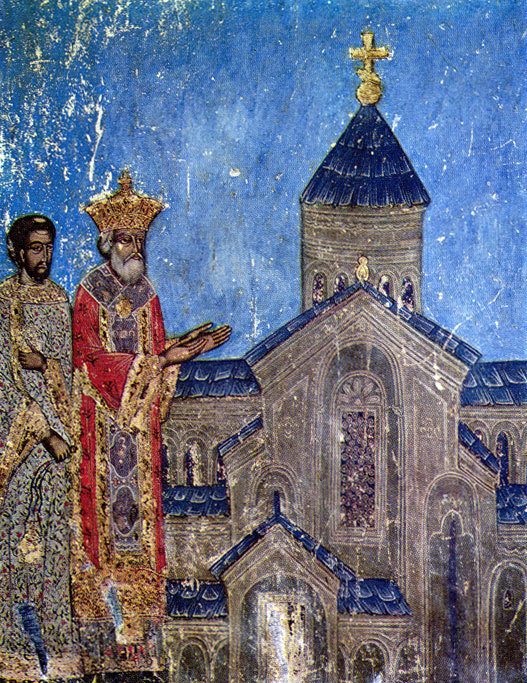
King Mirian III of Iberia.
(Fresco from Svetitskhoveli Cathedral, Georgia).

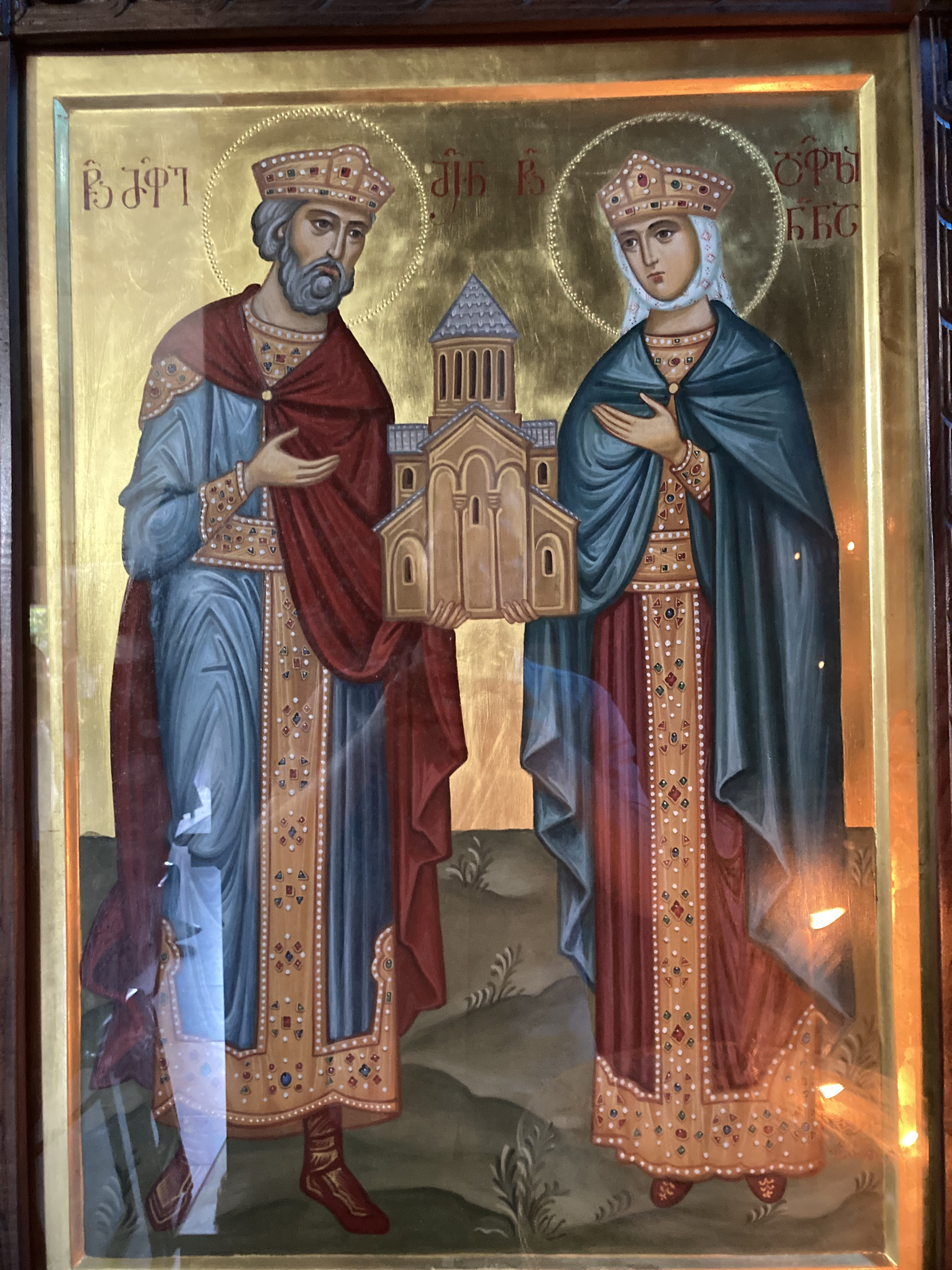
King Mirian III of Iberia and Queen Nana of Mtskheta.

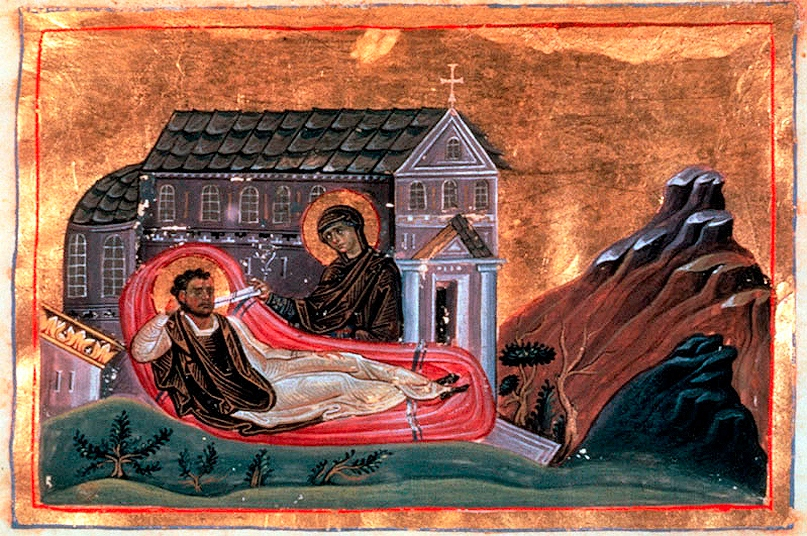
St. Romanus the Melodist.
(Menologion of Basil II, 10th century).

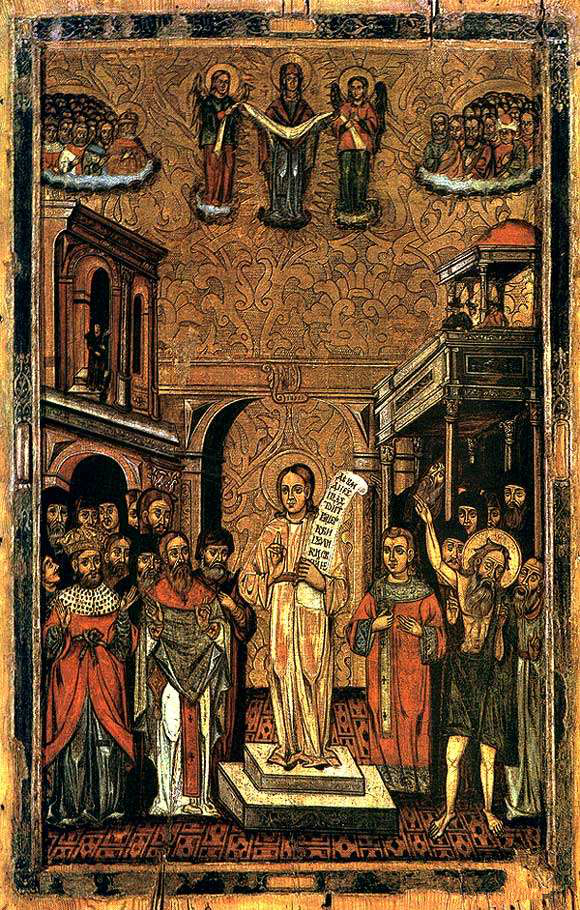
St. Romanus the Melodist.
(1649).

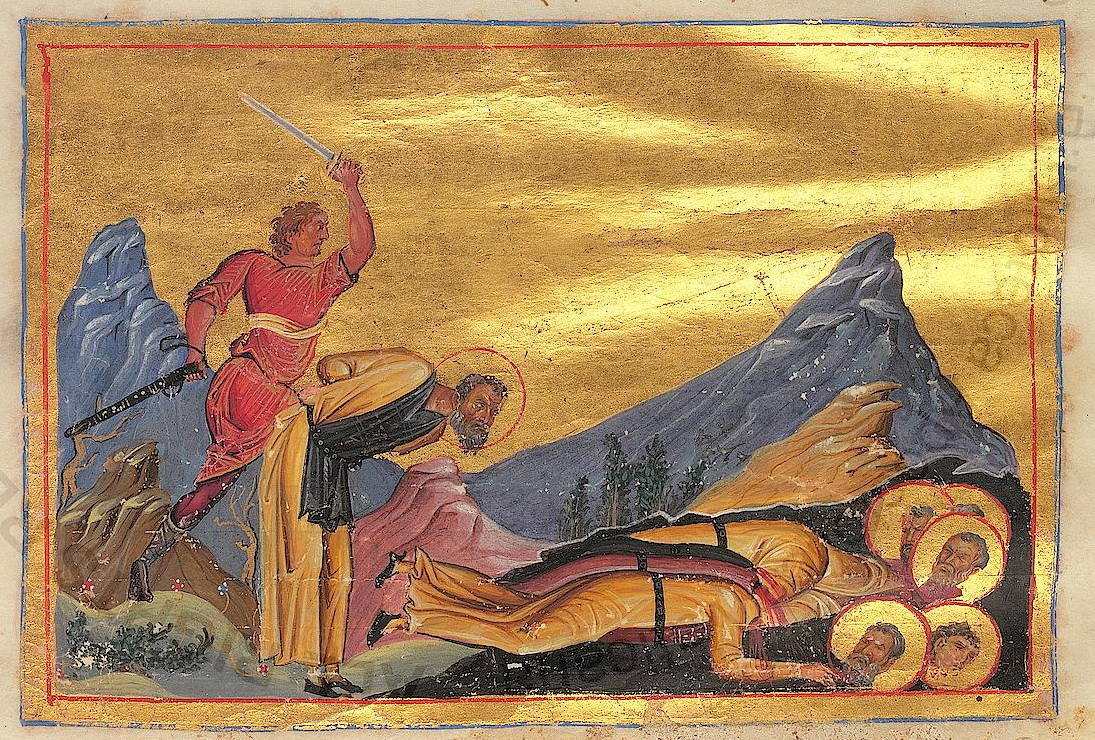
Monk-Martyrs Michael, Abbot of Zovia Monastery near Sebaste, and 36 fathers with him.
(Menologion of Basil II, 10th century).

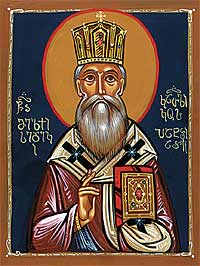
St. Melchizedek I, Catholicos-Patriarch of Georgia.

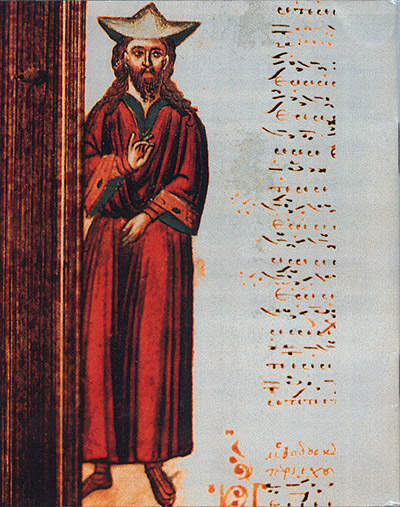
St Ioannis Koukouzelis.

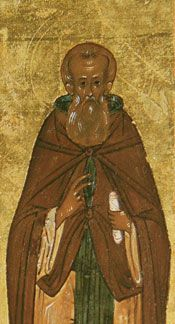
St. Savva of Vishera.

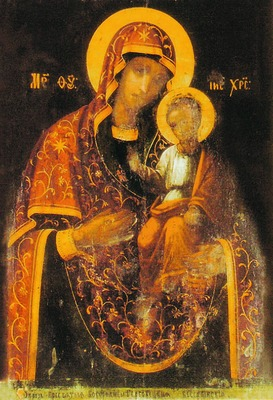
Icon of the Mother of God of Gerbovets (Herbovetska).

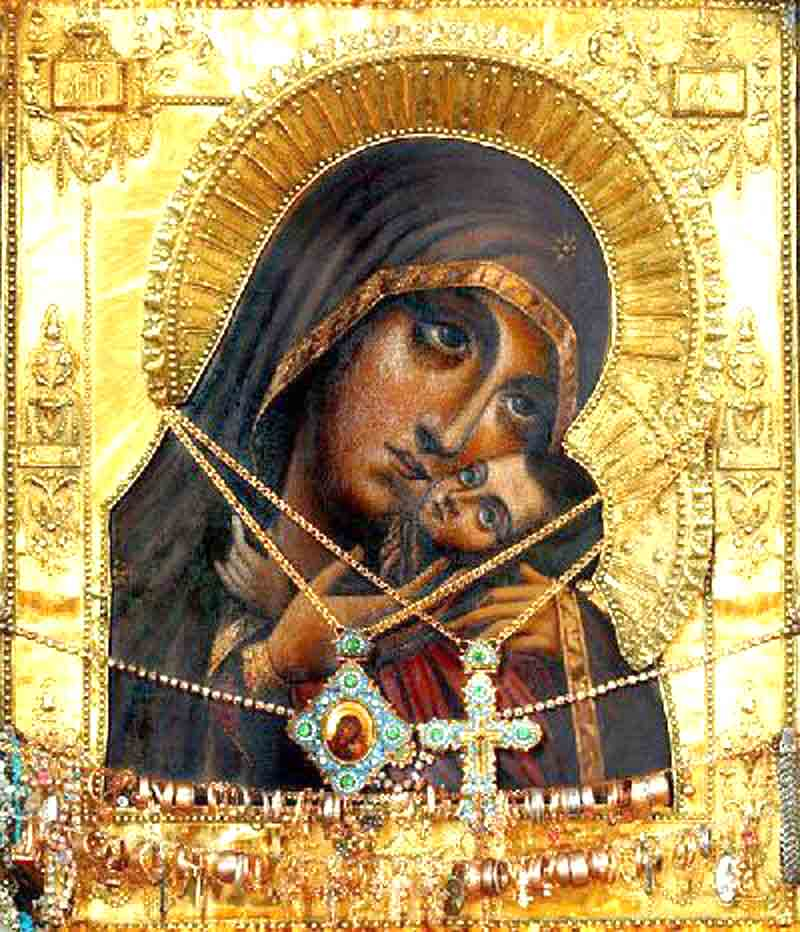
Icon of the Mother of God of Kasperov.

== Sources ==
- October 1/14. Orthodox Calendar (PRAVOSLAVIE.RU).
- October 14 / October 1. HOLY TRINITY RUSSIAN ORTHODOX CHURCH (A Parish of the Patriarchate of Moscow).
- October 1. OCA - The Lives of the Saints.
- October 1. Latin Saints of the Orthodox Patriarchate of Rome.
- The Roman Martyrology. Transl. by the Archbishop of Baltimore. Last Edition, According to the Copy Printed at Rome in 1914. Revised Edition, with the Imprimatur of His Eminence Cardinal Gibbons. Baltimore: John Murphy Company, 1916. pp. 303–304.
- Rev. Richard Stanton. A Menology of England and Wales, or, Brief Memorials of the Ancient British and English Saints Arranged According to the Calendar, Together with the Martyrs of the 16th and 17th Centuries. London: Burns & Oates, 1892. pp. 468–470.

Greek Sources

- Great Synaxaristes: (in Greek) 1 ΟΚΤΩΒΡΙΟΥ . ΜΕΓΑΣ ΣΥΝΑΞΑΡΙΣΤΗΣ.
- (in Greek) Συναξαριστής. 1 Οκτωβρίου. ECCLESIA.GR. (H ΕΚΚΛΗΣΙΑ ΤΗΣ ΕΛΛΑΔΟΣ).

Russian Sources

- (in Russian) 14 октября (1 октября). Православная Энциклопедия под редакцией Патриарха Московского и всея Руси Кирилла (электронная версия). (Orthodox Encyclopedia - Pravenc.ru).
- (in Russian) 1 октября (ст.ст.) 14 октября 2013 (нов. ст.). Русская Православная Церковь Отдел внешних церковных связей. (DECR).
- (in Russian) 1 октября по старому стилю / 14 октября по новому стилю. Русская Православная Церковь - Православный церковный календарь на 2016 год.
