= 1914 Belgian general election =

← 1912	24 May 1914	1919 →

88 of the 186 seats in the Chamber of Representatives
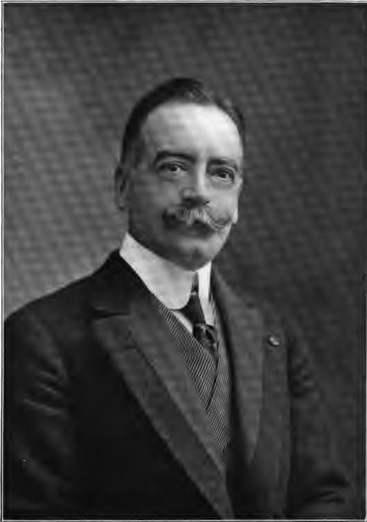

	First party	Second party	Third party
Leader	Charles de Broqueville	Laurent Vandersmissen
Party	Catholic	Labour	Liberal
Seats won	41	26	20
Popular vote	570,806	404,701	326,922
Percentage	42.77%	30.32%	24.50%
Government before election
De Broqueville I
Catholic
Government after election
De Broqueville I
Catholic

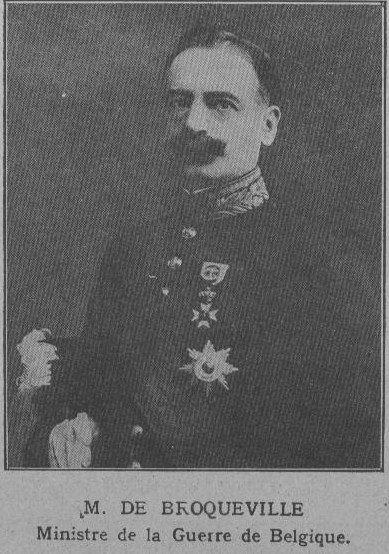
Prime Minister Charles de Broqueville

Partial general elections were held in Belgium on 24 May 1914. The result was a victory for the Catholic Party, which won 41 of the 88 seats up for election in the Chamber of Representatives.

The Catholics had formed the government continuously since 1884; the incumbent de Broqueville government was in office since 1911.

Under the alternating system, elections were only held in four out of the nine provinces: Hainaut, Limburg, Liège and East Flanders. This was the last time this system was applied, as the next elections in 1919 saw the introduction of full four-year terms.

The elections occurred shortly before the outbreak of World War I. The newly elected legislature met for just one day in a special session: on 4 August 1914, when King Albert I addressed the United Chambers of Parliament upon the German invasion of Belgium. The parliament met again after the war in November 1918.

== Results ==
Party	Votes	%	Seats
Party	Votes	%	Won
Catholic Party	570,806	42.77	41
Belgian Labour Party	404,701	30.32	26
Liberal Party	326,922	24.50	20
Christene Volkspartij	22,219	1.66	1
Socialist dissidents	2,052	0.15	0
Catholic dissidents	1,786	0.13	0
Independents	6,095	0.46	0
Total	1,334,581	100.00	88
Source: Belgian Elections

== Seats up for election ==
Seats in the provinces of Antwerp, Brabant, Luxembourg, Namur and West Flanders were not up for election.

Province	Arrondissement(s)	Chamber
Limburg	Hasselt	3
Limburg	Tongeren-Maaseik	4
East Flanders	Aalst	5
East Flanders	Oudenaarde	3
East Flanders	Gent-Eeklo	12
East Flanders	Dendermonde	4
East Flanders	Sint-Niklaas	4
Hainaut	Tournai-Ath	6
Hainaut	Charleroi	11
Hainaut	Thuin	3
Hainaut	Mons	7
Hainaut	Soignies	4
Liège	Huy-Waremme	4
Liège	Liège	13
Liège	Verviers	5
Total		88

== Elected members ==
Apart from the re-elected members, the following six members were newly elected:

- Paul Van Hoegaerden-Braconier (liberal), elected in Liège to replace Charles Van Marcke de Lummen (liberal), who did not seek re-election.
- Alfred Journez (liberal), elected in Liège to replace Ferdinand Fléchet (liberal), who was not a candidate for health reasons.
- Paul-Emile Janson (liberal), elected in Tournai to replace Albert Asou (liberal), who did not seek re-election to the Chamber.
- Paul Neven (liberal), elected in Tongeren-Maaseik to replace Auguste Van Ormelingen (catholic).
- Clément Peten (liberal), elected in Hasselt to replace Albert de Menten de Horne (catholic).
- Joseph Wauters (socialist), elected in Huy-Waremme to replace Jules Giroul (liberal).
