= Environmental Benefits Index =

The Environmental Benefits Index is an index that has been used by the FSA Farm Service Agency of the United States Department of Agriculture since 1990 to rank farmers’ requests to enroll land into the Conservation Reserve Program during each general sign-up period. The only enrollment mechanisms that do not use the index are the Conservation Reserve Enhancement Program and continuous enrollment, for which a total of 4 million acres (16,000 km^{2}) has been reserved.

The index, as currently structured, assigns points for cost to the government and 6 other factors; 1) wildlife benefits, up to 100 points; 2) water quality benefits, up to 100 points; 3) on-farm erosion control, up to 100 points; 4) enduring benefits, up to 50 points; 5) air quality benefits, up to 35 points; and 6) in a state or national priority area, 25 points. Bids only are accepted if they exceed a threshold level that is determined after the total value of the benefits that each bid would provide are compared.

The index continues to be adjusted from general signup to general signup.
