= Conservation Reserve Enhancement Program =

A sub-program of the Conservation Reserve Program, the Conservation Reserve Enhancement Program (CREP) is a state-federal multi-year land retirement United States Department of Agriculture (USDA) program developed by states and targeted to specific state and nationally significant water quality, soil erosion, and wildlife habitat problems. CREP uses the state funds to offer higher payments per acre to participants than the CRP. States may enroll up to 100,000 acres (400 km^{2}) through an approved CREP, and at least three states have more than one CREP. USDA has reserved 4 million acres (16,000 km^{2}) from the authorized 39,200,000-acre (159,000 km^{2}) total to enroll through either this option or the continuous enrollment option. Currently, 26 states have approved CREPs, and through March 2005, more than 645,000 acres (2,610 km^{2}) had been enrolled under this option. As of June 2005, proposals were pending for seven additional states.

== See also ==
- Environmental Benefits Index
