= Food Aid Consultative Group =

The Food Aid Consultative Group was created by the 1990 farm bill (P.L. 101-624) (7 U.S.C. 1725) to review and address issues concerning the effectiveness of regulations and procedures that govern U.S. food aid programs. The 2002 farm bill (P.L. 107-171) extended the authority for the Food Aid Consultative Group through 2007.
