= Peten Castle =

- Velm, Belgium
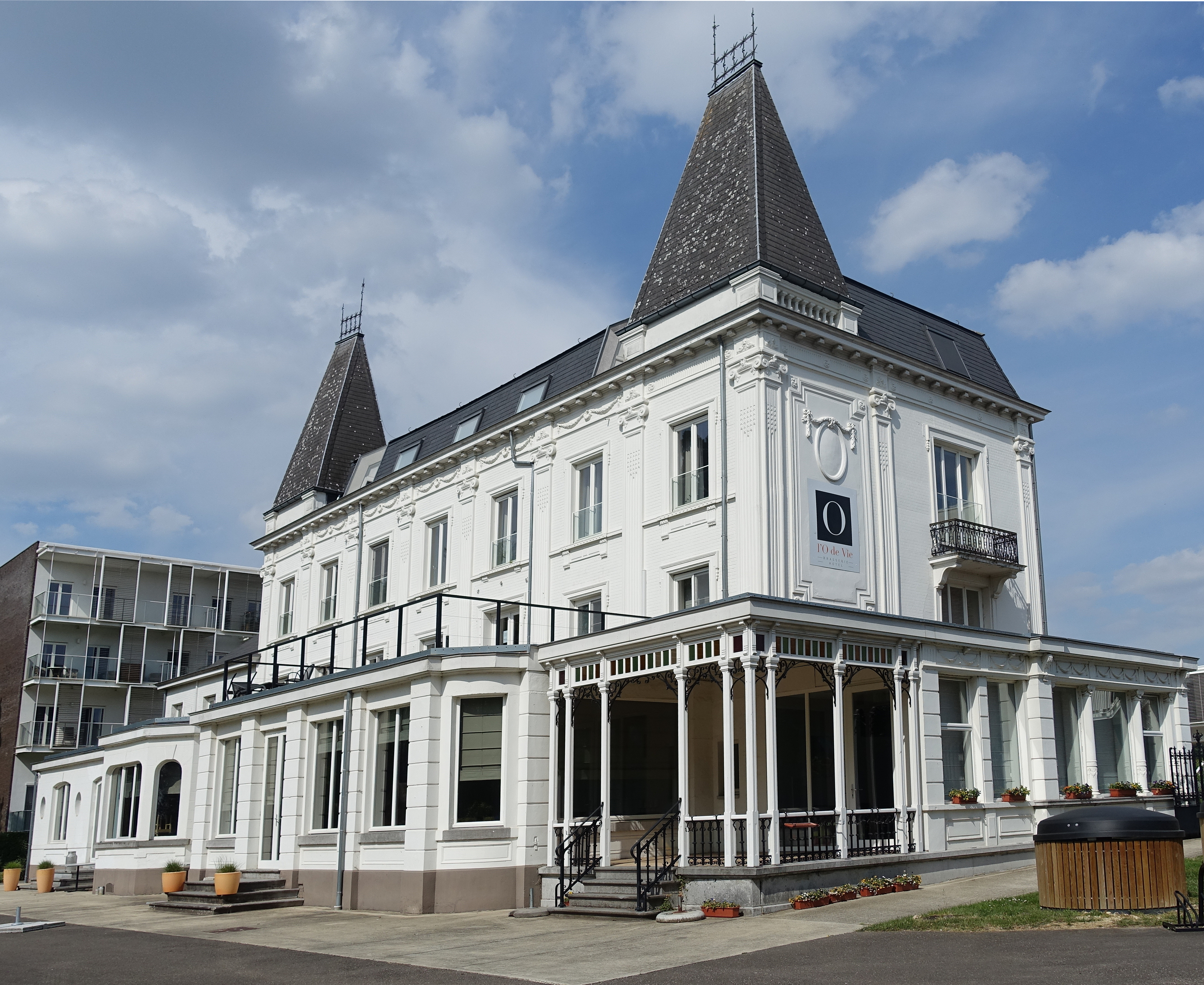

Site information
- Type: Castle

Location
- Coordinates: 50°46′18.64″N 5°8′25.79″E

Peten Castle (also: Castle Peten-Van Halen) is a 19th-century castle in Velm (Sint-Truiden), Belgium.

== History ==
Formerly a closed farm (gesloten boerderij), it was converted into a neoclassical castle in the early 20th century, with an L-shaped plan. It has a small turret, covered by a high hip roof.

This renovation was done by Clément Peten, parliamentarian, industrialist, horse breeder and mayor of Velm from 1868 to 1929, and his wife Eugénie van Halen. Peten came from Roosbeek, where his ancestor Marcus had leased a 65-acre terrain with house, yard, barn and orchard, which the family turned into a successful stud farm that after being destroyed during World War I was rebuilt as a villa with turret (Villa Peten in Boutersem) by his descendant Clément.

Clément Peten's son Clément junior had difficulties maintaining his father's business, and his wife preferred living in Brussels. Thus, when his mother Eugene van Halen died in 1952, they sold the castle. The Sisters of Charity acquired the castle and housed a technical school in it, the Technical School Onze-LieveVrouw-Rozenkrans, which ran until recently. New buildings were built for the new purpose, but the castle was left untouched.

On the estate's ground there is also a monumental giant sequoia.

Around 2005, a private developer took over the domain and expanded it into an extensive care site for senior citizens, including a residential care center and other services. The castle was transformed into a brasserie and hotel. The former castle park with important trees, such as the giant sequoia has been preserved as Triamant park.
