= Food Security Act of 1985 =

United States federal law

- Other short titles: Food for Progress Act of 1985; National Agricultural Policy Commission Act of 1985; National Agricultural Research, Extension, and Teaching Policy Act of 1985; National Aquaculture Improvement Act of 1985; Pork Promotion, Research, and Consumer Information Act of 1985; Watermelon Research and Promotion Act; U.S. Farm Bill of 1985
- Long title: An Act to extend and revise agricultural price support and related programs, to provide for agricultural export, resource conservation, farm credit, and agricultural research and related programs, to continue food assistance to low-income persons, to ensure consumers an abundance of food and fiber at reasonable prices, and for other purposes.
- Acronyms (colloquial): FSA, BPRA
- Nicknames: Beef Promotion and Research Act of 1985
- Enacted by: the 99th United States Congress
- Effective: December 23, 1985

Citations
- Public law: 99–198
- Statutes at Large: 99 Stat. 1354

Codification
- Titles amended: 7 U.S.C.: Agriculture
- U.S.C. sections amended: 7 U.S.C. ch. 35 § 1281 et seq.; 7 U.S.C. ch. 35A, subch. I § 1421 et seq.; 7 U.S.C. ch. 35A, subch. III § 1446 et seq.; 7 U.S.C. ch. 26, subch. III § 608c; 7 U.S.C. ch. 62 § 2901 et seq.

Legislative history
- Introduced in the House; Signed into law by President Ronald Reagan on December 23, 1985

Major amendments
- Technical Corrections to Food Security Act of 1985 Amendments

The Food Security Act of 1985 (P.L. 99–198, also known as the 1985 U.S. Farm Bill), a five-year omnibus farm bill, allowed lower commodity price, income supports, and established a dairy herd buyout program. This 1985 farm bill made changes in a variety of other USDA programs. Several enduring conservation programs were created, including sodbuster, swampbuster, and the Conservation Reserve Program.

== Summary ==
The Food Security Act of 1985 was passed by the United States Congress on December 18, 1985, and signed by the President Ronald Reagan on December 23, 1985.

This was the first farm bill with a specific title devoted to conservation programs and policies. The 1985 Farm Bill included the Conservation Reserve Program (CRP) in its current form and operation, but most notably it included conservation compliance requirements: to be eligible for commodity subsidies farmers had to comply with provisions known as swampbuster (addressing the draining of wetlands), sodbuster (addressing the plowing of native sod) and requirements conservation planning for any farming on Highly Erodible Land.

Shortly after enactment, the Technical Corrections to Food Security Act of 1985 Amendments (P.L. 99-253) gave USDA discretion to require cross-compliance for wheat and feed grains instead of mandating them, changed acreage base calculations, and specified election procedures for local Agricultural Stabilization and Conservation committees. Technical changes and other modifications were enacted by the Food Security Improvements Act of 1986 (P.L. 99-260), including limiting the non-program crops that could be planted under the 50/92 provision, permitting haying and grazing on diverted wheat and feed grain acreage for a limited period in regions of distress, and increasing deductions taken from the price of milk received by producers to fund the dairy termination program (also called the whole herd buy-out) program. Again in 1986, the Omnibus Budget Reconciliation Act of 1986 (P.L. 99-509) made changes in the 1985 Act requiring advance deficiency payments to be made to producers of 1987 wheat, feed grains, upland cotton, and rice crops at a minimum of 40% for wheat and feed grains and 30% for rice and upland cotton. The 1985 Act also amended the Farm Credit Act of 1971. Further commodity program changes were made in the FY1987 agricultural appropriations bill (P.L. 99-591). In addition to its funding provisions, P.L. 99-591 set the annual payment limitation at $50,000 per person for deficiency and paid land diversion payments, and included honey, resource adjustment (excluding land diversion), disaster, and Findley payments under a $250,000 aggregate payment limitation. Once again, the Omnibus Budget Reconciliation Act of 1987 (P.L. 100–203) not only set the 1988 fiscal year budget for agriculture and all federal agencies, but also set target prices for 1988 and 1989 program crops, established loan rates for program and non-program crops, and required a voluntary paid land diversion for feed grains. P.L. 100-203 further defined who could receive farm program payments by defining a "person" in terms of payment limitations.

== See also ==
- Dairy Export Incentive Program
