= Findley payments =

Findley payments — Under the so-called Findley Provision authorized by the Food Security Act of 1985, P.L. 99-198, (and first sponsored by former Illinois Representative Paul Findley), USDA was able to reduce the basic, formula-set nonrecourse loan rate for major crops by up to an additional 20% if that was necessary to keep the United States competitive in international markets. If done, direct compensatory payments were made to producers equal to the amount of the loan rate reduction. These Findley Payments, limited to $200,000 per person, essentially added to the larger direct deficiency payment. The Findley provisions were superseded by the marketing loan repayment provisions of the 1996 farm bill (P.L. 104-127).
