= Piatus of Tournai =

Saint Piatus
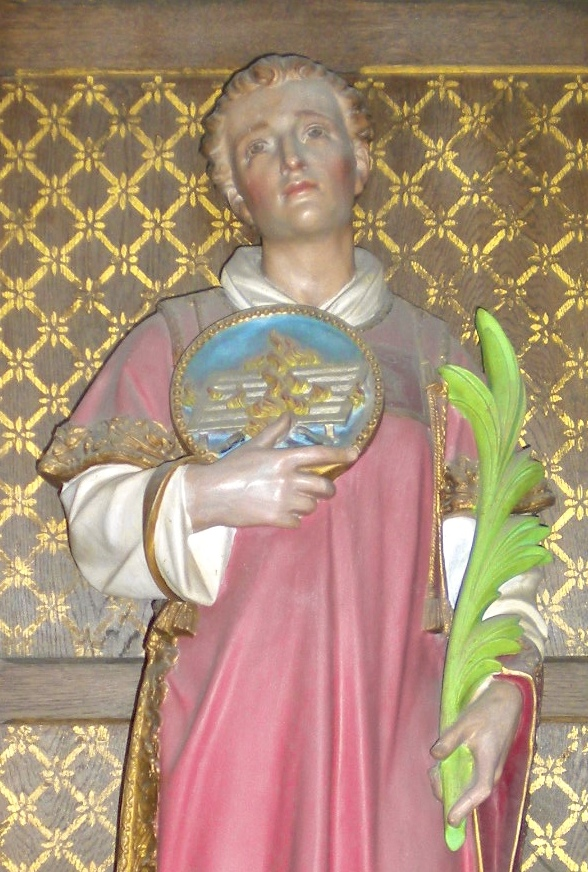
- Statue of Saint Piatus in Anstaing

Hieromartyr
- Born: c. 3rd century Benevento, Italy
- Died: c. 286; Tournai, Belgium
- Venerated in: Roman Catholic Church; Eastern Orthodox Church
- Canonized: Pre-Congregation
- Feast: October 1
- Attributes: holding top part of his skull
- Patronage: Tournai

Piatus of Tournai (also Piaton, Platon, Piat, Piato) (died c. 286) was a Belgian saint. He was a native of Benevento, Italy, and is traditionally said to have been sent by the pope to evangelize the cities of Chartres and Tournai. Tradition also states that he was ordained by Dionysios the Areopagite. He was martyred under Maximian by having the top of his skull sliced off. He may be recognized in depictions holding the sliced portion of his skull. Eligius later discovered Piatus' relics and made a reliquary for them.

Some of his relics can be found at Chartres Cathedral.

== Gallery ==
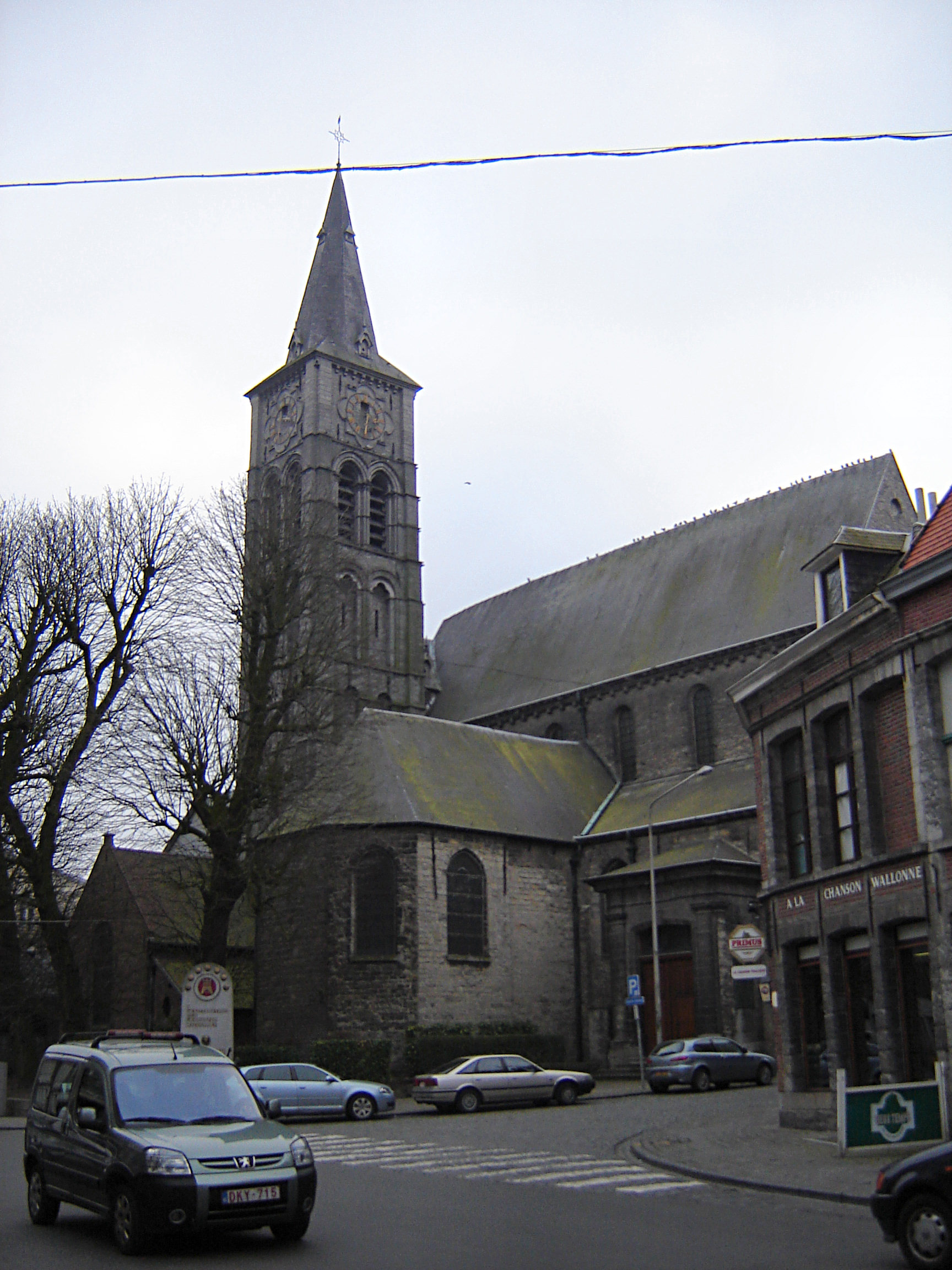
Church of Saint-Piat, Tournai

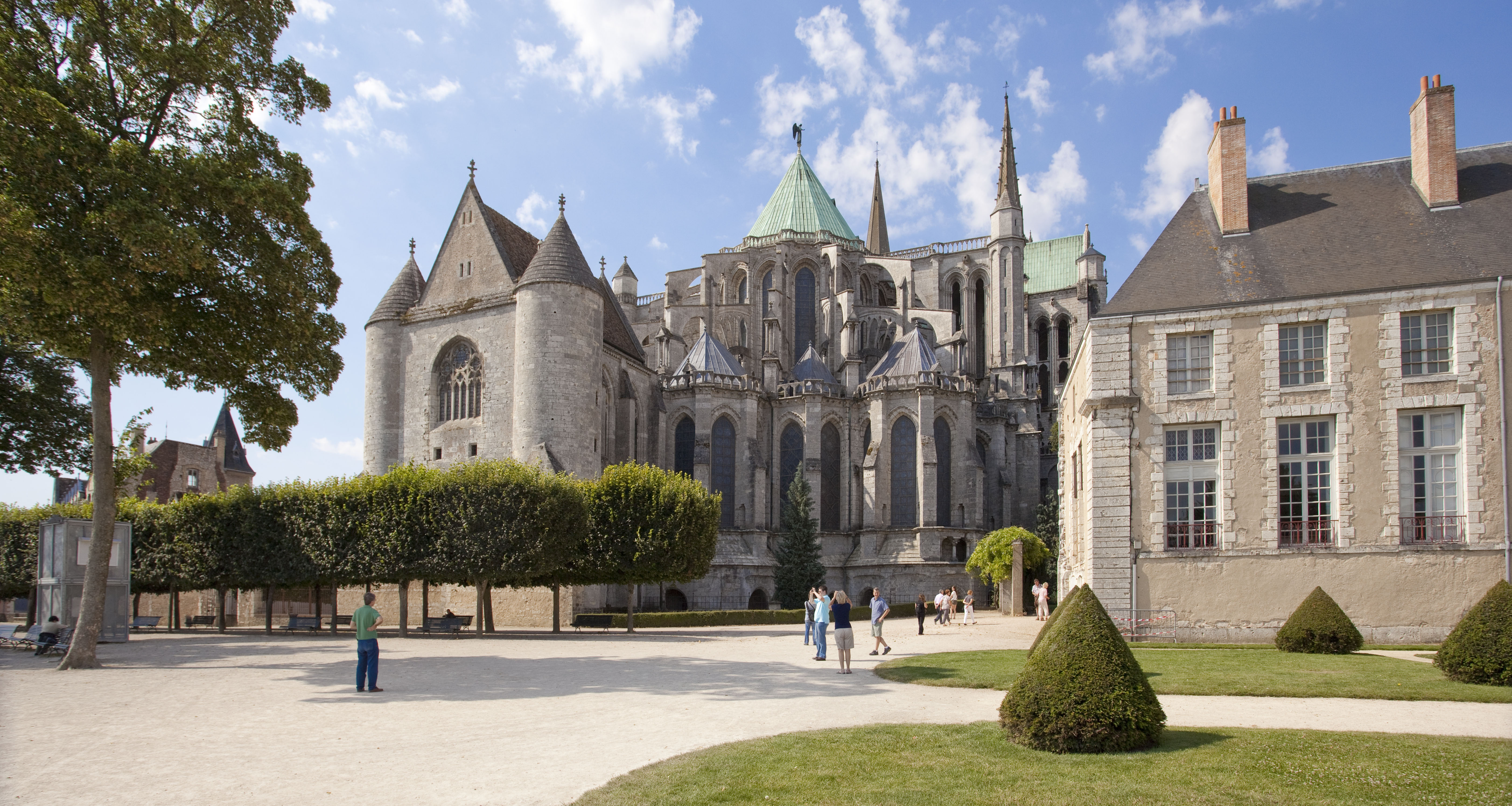
Chapel of Saint-Piat, Chartres Cathedral

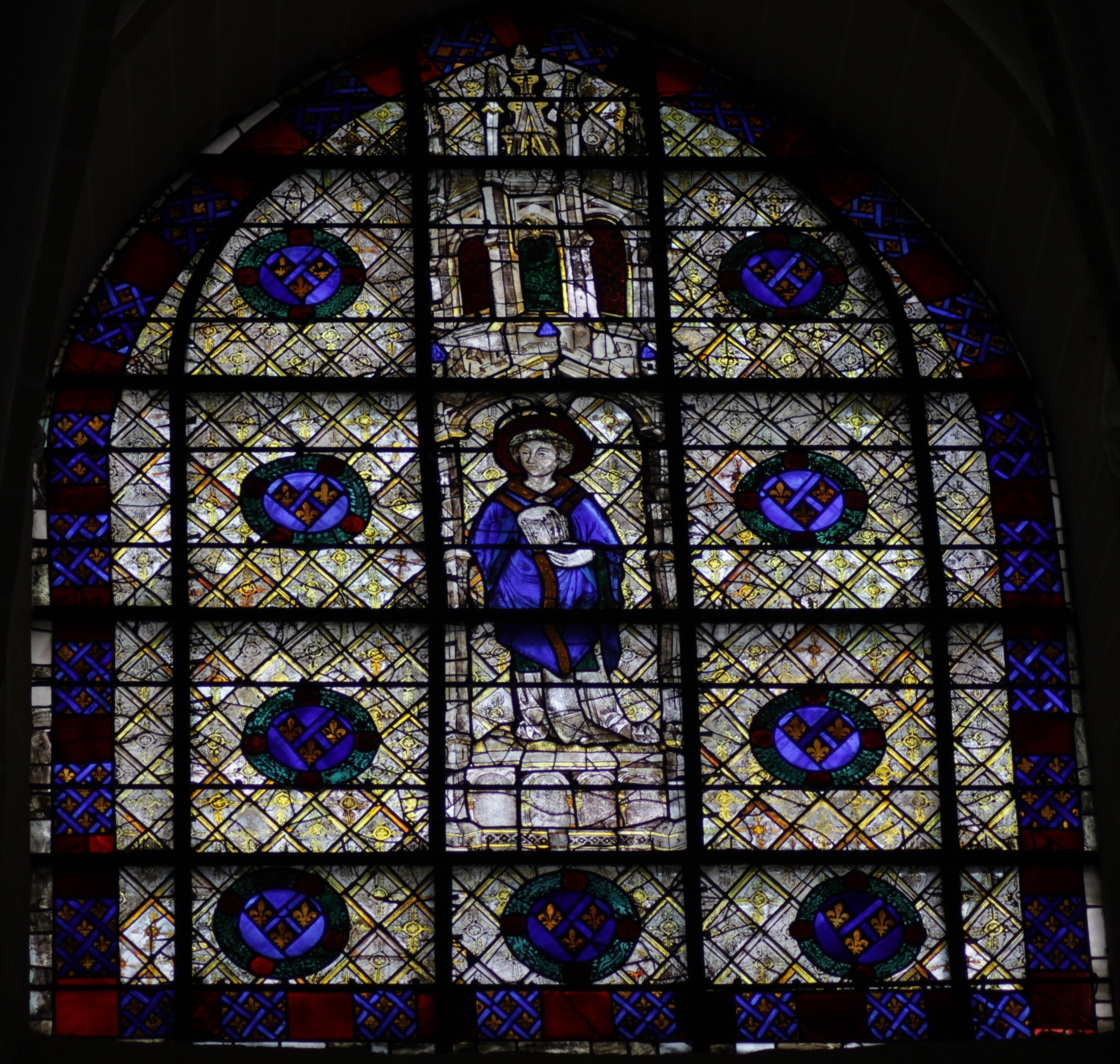
Stained-glass window of Saint-Piat in Chartres Cathedral
