= Albaud of Toul =

Saint Albaud of Toul, otherwise Aladius or Albin (d. c. 525) was a 6th-century bishop of Toul. He is venerated as a saint in the Catholic church with a feast day celebrated on 1 March.

== Biography ==
Albaud was a priest and a close friend of Saint Evre, whom he succeeded as the eighth bishop of Toul, in which post he served between approximately 507 and 525. He completed the church begun by his predecessor and dedicated to him. He also founded a religious community for men to which he gave the Rule of Agaunum, the origin of the Benedictine Abbey of St. Evre.

His residence, built in the 6th century, constituted the first bishop's palace and was known as the Curia Albaudi or Cour Saint Albaud. It remained till the 13th century, when it was demolished during the construction of the present cathedral. It was located near the cloister.

== Veneration ==
Albaud died about 525 and his body was buried in the church of the Abbey of St. Evre. Saint Gauzelin, thirty-second bishop of Toul, who ministered between 922 and 962, disinterred his remains and placed them in a reliquary.

The feast of Saint Albaud is celebrated on 1 March. For centuries, pilgrims came to venerate his relics and to receive from the monks a distribution of specially blessed wine, known as the vinage or vinaigre de Saint Albaud. Until the 19th century, the inhabitants of Toul retained this tradition, having the wine blessed in the abbey. This drink was given to the sick in the hope that it might heal them.

Albaud's successor was Trifsorich of Toul.

== See also ==
- Catholic Church in France
