= Integrated Farm Management Program =

The Integrated Farm Management Program (IFMP) was a program authorized by the 1990 farm bill (P.L. 101-624) to assist producers in adopting resource-conserving crop rotations by protecting participants’ base acreage, payment yields, and program payments. The program’s goal was to enroll 3 to 5 million acres (20,000 km^{2}) over 5 years. The 1996 farm bill (P.L. 104-127) replaced the IFMP with production flexibility contracts and a pilot Conservation Farm Option Program.

== See also ==
- Dairy Export Incentive Program
