= Dairy Export Incentive Program =

The Dairy Export Incentive Program (DEIP) is a program that offers subsidies to exporters of U.S. dairy products to help them compete with other nations. USDA pays cash to exporters as bonuses to help them sell certain U.S. dairy products at prices below the exporter’s cost of acquiring them. The program was originally authorized by the Food Security Act of 1985 (P.L. 99-198) and extended by the 1990 farm bill (P.L. 101-624) and the Uruguay Round Agreements Act of 1994 (P.L. 103-465). The total tonnage and dollar amount of these and other export subsidies have been limited by the Uruguay Round Agreement on Agriculture.

The 2002 farm bill (P.L. 107-171) extended the program through 2007.

== See also ==
- Integrated Farm Management Program
