= Erosion index =

Measurement of erosion potential

The erosion index (EI, also called the erodibility index) is created by dividing potential erosion (from all sources except gully erosion) by the T value, which is the rate of soil erosion above which long term productivity may be adversely affected. The erodibility index is used in conjunction with conservation compliance and the Conservation Reserve Program. For example, one of the eligibility requirements for the CRP is that land have an EI greater than 8.
