= Clément Peten =

Belgian politician and horse breeder

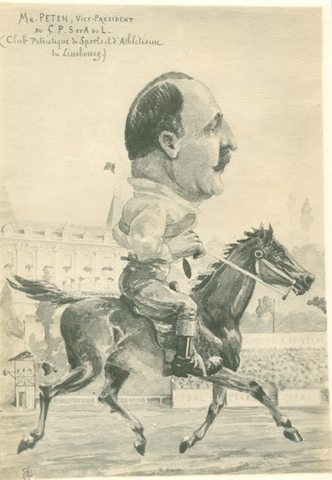
Caricature of Clément Peten on a horse in a busy hippodrome with a playful variation on the CPSAL acronym

Clément Martin Joseph Peten also known as Peut (19 November 1866 – 26 February 1929) was a Belgian parliamentarian, mayor, horse breeder, landowner, and agricultural engineer.

== Biography ==
Peten was a son of the gentleman farmer François-Benoit Peten (1815–1890) and of Apolline Fallas (1823–1901). He married Eugénie Vanhaelen (1869–1952) of a wealthy Brussels family and they had four children: Hélène (1894–1956), Gabrielle (1897–1984), Frans (1903–1903) and Clément Jr. (1905–1957). His ancestor Marcus Peeten, the owner of a leasehold in Roosbeek (registered in 1830) as well as a brewery with pleasure garden, turned his farm into a stud farm that played a non-trivial role in the development of the Belgian Draught horse, producing several national champions.

Peten graduated as an agricultural engineer and was a landowner and horse breeder. As a horse breeder he won awards for his Belgian horses, and his fame as a horse expert reached America. Peten owned 430 hectares of land with 162 tenants. He experimented with water and energy in his estate.

He was an alderman and municipal councilor of Velm, and from 1898 until his death he was its mayor. During World War I he was part of the National Relief and Nutrition Committee WWI. He was the owner of Peten Castle in Velme.

He was a liberal member of Parliament for the Arrondissement of Hasselt from 1904 to 1912 and from 1914 to 1921: he defeated knight de Corswarem van Hasselt in 1904, but lost his seat to knight de Menten de Horne in 1912. He was back in parliament again from 1914 to 1921 after he in turn defeated de Menten.

He defended the agricultural interests of Limburg and was the father-in-law of baron Auguste de Tornaco te Clavier. His son Clément junior (1905–1957) also became mayor.

He died in a hospital in Leuven as a result of a car accident.

== Publications ==
- Le cheval de trait, in: The Times, special number dedicated to Belgium, 9 April 1920.
