= Permanent vegetative cover =

Vegetation composed of plants with minimum 5-year lifespan

Permanent vegetative cover refers to trees, perennial bunchgrasses and grasslands, legumes, and shrubs with an expected life span of at least 5 years.

In the United States, permanent cover is required on cropland entered into the Conservation Reserve Program.
