= Grassed waterway =

Body of surface water

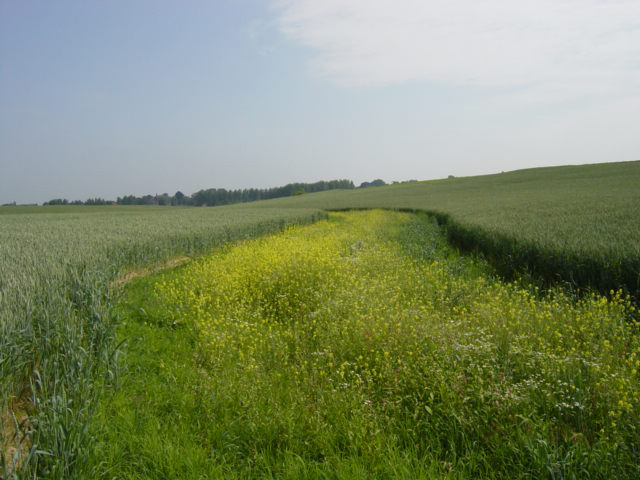
Grassed waterway in Velm, Belgium, during a sunny day

A grassed waterway is a 2-to-48-meter-wide (6.6-to-157.5-foot) native grassland strip of green belt. It is generally installed in the thalweg, the deepest continuous line along a valley or watercourse, of a cultivated dry valley in order to control erosion. A study carried out on a grassed waterway during 8 years in Bavaria showed that it can lead to several other types of positive impacts, e.g. on biodiversity.

== Distinctions ==
Confusion between "grassed waterway" and "vegetative filter strips" should be avoided. The latter are generally narrower (only a few metres wide) and rather installed along rivers as well as along or within cultivated fields. However, buffer strip can be a synonym, with shrubs and trees added to the plant component, as does a riparian zone.

== Runoff and erosion mitigation ==
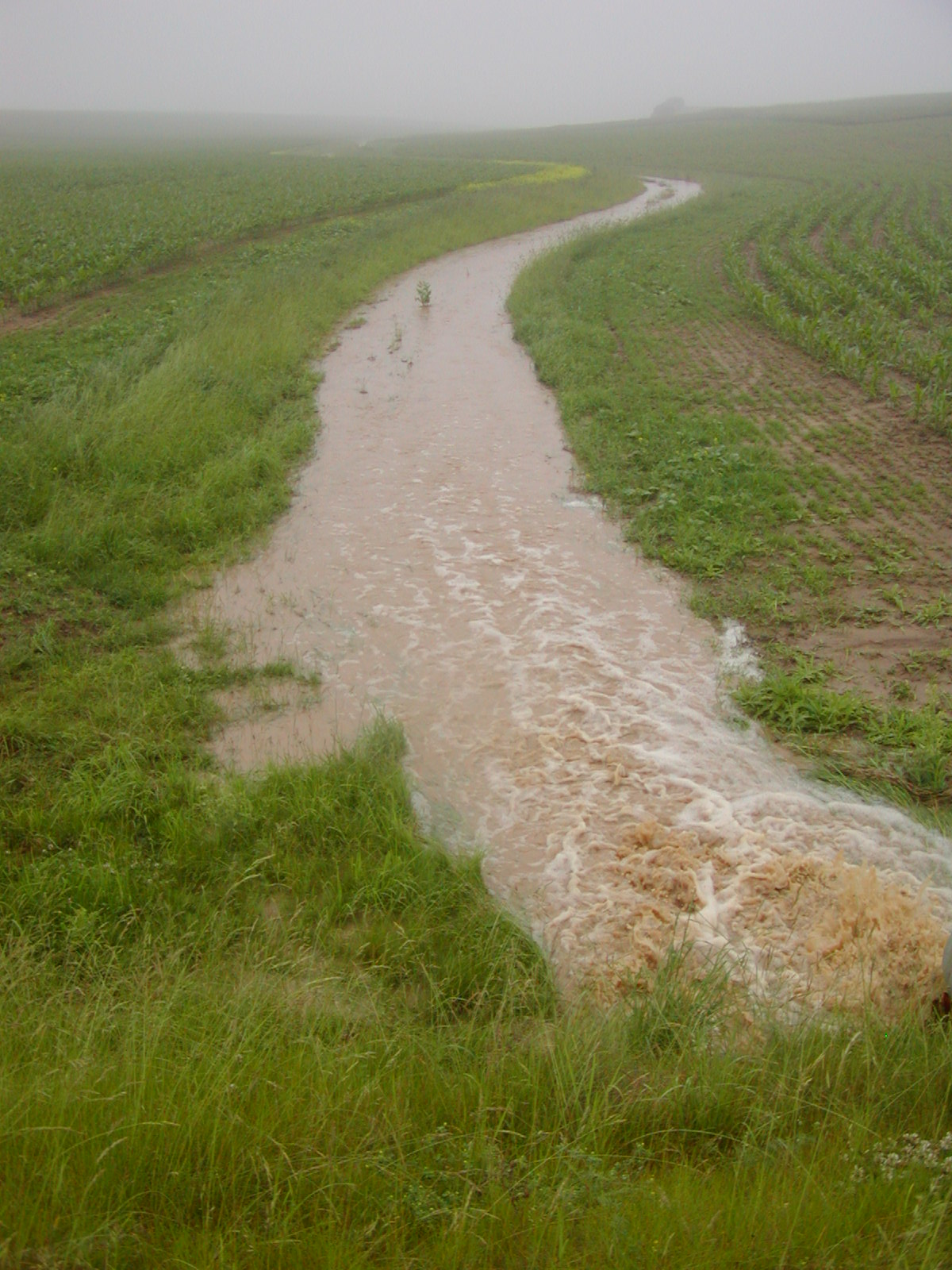
Grassed waterway in Velm, Belgium, after a thunderstorm

Runoff generated on cropland during storms or long winter rains concentrates in the thalweg where it can lead to rill or gully erosion.

Rills and gullies further concentrate runoff and speed up its transfer, which can worsen damage occurring downstream. This can result in a muddy flood.

In this context, a grassed waterway allows increasing soil cohesion and roughness. It also prevents the formation of rills and gullies. Furthermore, it can slow down runoff and allow its re-infiltration during long winter rains. In contrast, its infiltration capacity is generally not sufficient to reinfiltrate runoff produced by heavy spring and summer storms. It can therefore be useful to combine it with extra measures, like the installation of earthen dams across the grassed waterway, in order to buffer runoff temporarily.
