= Frothar of Toul =

- Bishop of Toul
- Church: Catholic Church
- Diocese: Diocese of Toul
- In office: 813 – 847
- Predecessor: Diocese established
- Successor: Arnulf

Orders
- Consecration: 813 by Wulfar

Personal details
- Died: c. 847

Frothar of Toul was bishop of Toul from around 813 to his death in 847. He is known mainly for his surviving collection of letters. Before becoming bishop, he was abbot of St. Evre's Abbey, Toul.

He undertook work for Louis the Pious, both in dispute resolution, and architectural, at the palace at Gondreville.

== Sources ==
- Michel Parisse (1998), La correspondance d'un eveque carolingien: Frothaire de Toul (ca 813-847), avec les lettres de Theuthilde, abbesse de Remiremont
