= Farmable Wetlands Program =

United States wetlands conservation program

The Farmable Wetlands Program is a wetlands conservation program in the United States. The Farm Service Agency (FSA) runs the program through the Conservation Reserve Program (CRP), with the goal of rehabilitation previously farmed wetlands.

== Legislation ==
It was first authorized as a pilot program in Title XI of the FY2001 agriculture appropriations legislation (P.L. 106-387) to enroll up to 500,000 acres (2,000 km^{2}) of farmable wetlands smaller than 5 acres (20,000 m^{2}) in six Upper Midwest states (with no more than 150,000 acres (610 km^{2}) in a single state) into the Conservation Reserve Program. The 2002 farm bill (P.L. 107-171, Sec. 2101) made this a 2-million-acre (8,100 km^{2}) national program (with an enrollment limit of 100,000 acres (400 km^{2}) per state), and made changes in eligibility requirements, such as increasing the maximum size of eligible wetlands from 5 acres (20,000 m^{2}) to 10 acres (40,000 m^{2}).
