= Gorze Abbey =

Monastery in Gorze, France

Coordinates: 49°3′14″N 5°59′48″E

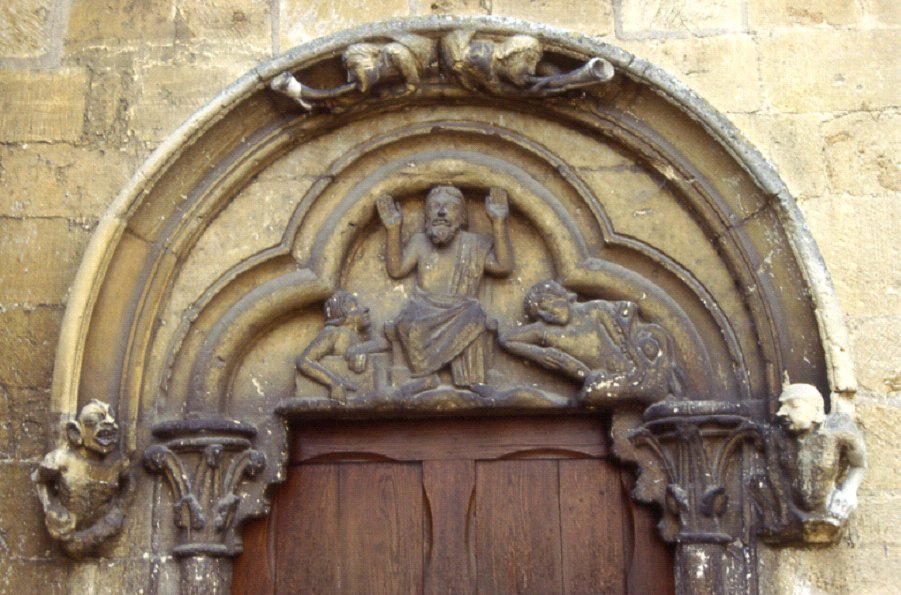
Tympanum of the Last Judgment, St. Stephen's Church, Gorze, once part of the abbey

Gorze Abbey was a Benedictine monastery in Gorze in the present arrondissement of Metz, near Metz in Lorraine. It was prominent as the source of a monastic reform movement in the 930s.

== History ==
Gorze Abbey was founded in around 757 by Bishop Chrodegang of Metz, who obtained for it from Rome the relics of Saint Gorgonius. The new community at first followed his Rule, but decline later set in. The highly placed Frankish lord Bivin of Gorze (810–863), married to a daughter of Boso the Elder, functioned as lay abbot of Gorze. In 933 the premises, by then semi-derelict, were given by Adalbero, Bishop of Metz, to John of Gorze and Einald of Toul so that they could restore observance of the Rule of St. Benedict. They did so extremely successfully and the customary of Gorze soon spread to many other monasteries, at first local, such as St. Maximin's Abbey, Trier, and St. Evre's Abbey, Toul, and later in more distant places, such as Bavaria, through the mediation of Wolfgang of Regensburg.

== Gorze Reform ==
The Gorze Reform was similar to the Cluniac Reform in that it aimed at a reestablishment of the Rule of St. Benedict, but quite different in several major areas. In particular, whereas Cluny created a centralised system of authority in which the religious houses adopting its reforms became subordinate to Cluny itself, the Gorze reforms preserved the independence of the participating monasteries, and resulted instead in a network of loosely connected affiliations based on several centres, such as Fulda, Niederaltaich, Einsiedeln and St. Emmeram's Abbey in Regensburg.

Gorze was also the home of the "chant messin", an early form of Gregorian chant or plainsong, as a part of the liturgy, and also of sacred drama, particularly in connection with the Easter rituals.

== After the reform ==
From the 12th century Gorze ceased to occupy the central spiritual position it had had previously. Nevertheless, in material terms it continued to prosper, and in the 12th and 13th centuries undertook substantial building works, including the lay church, which alone of the abbey buildings still survives, as the present parish church of Saint Stephen.

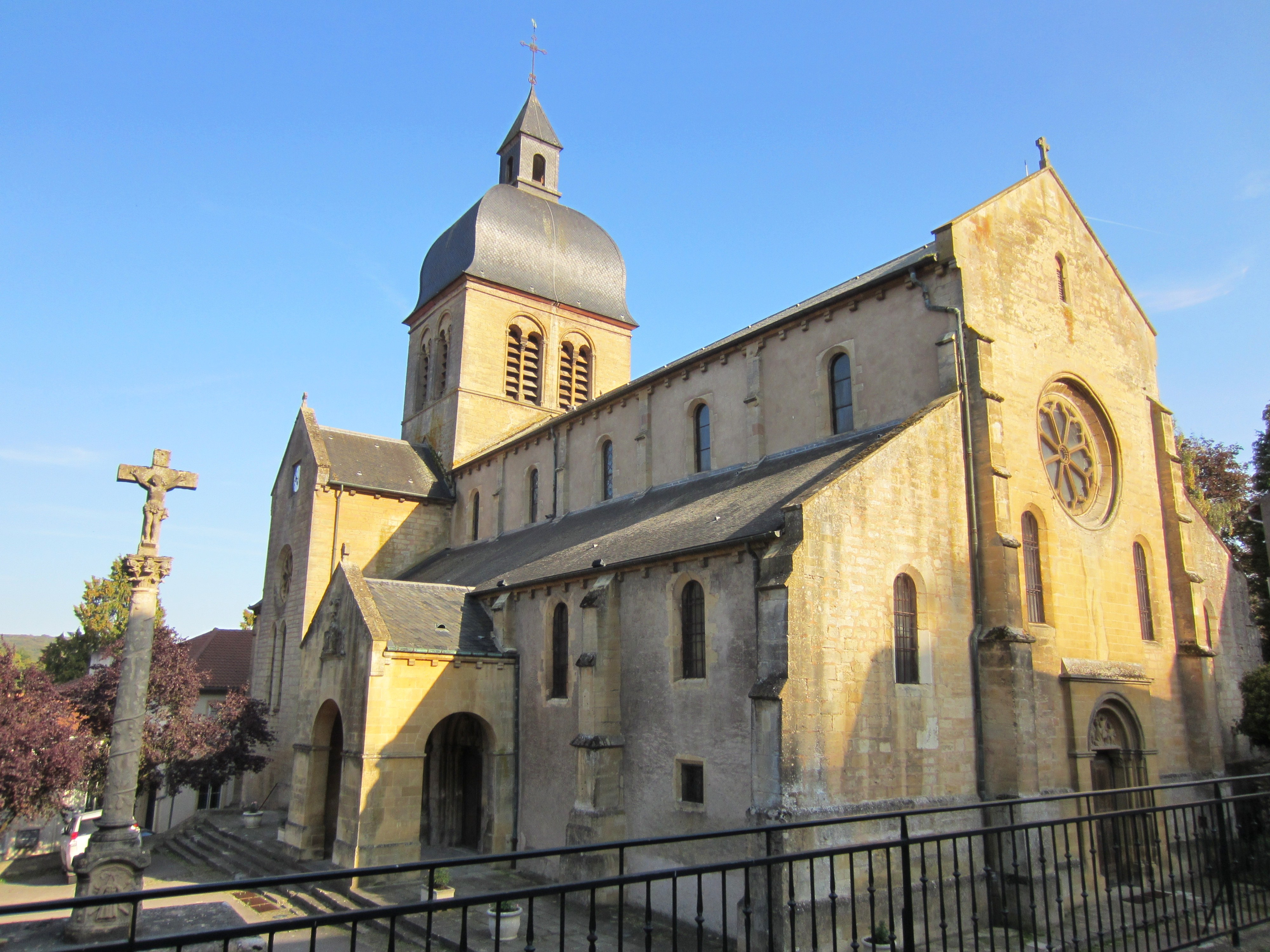
St. Stephen's Church, Gorze, once part of the abbey

The extensive territory which the abbey accumulated became known as the "Terre de Gorze". The abbey was dissolved in 1572 as a consequence of the Reformation. An attempt at a re-foundation in 1580 came to nothing, and the buildings, apart from St. Stephen's church, were demolished.

== Abbot's Palace ==
The "Terre de Gorze" continued however as a territorial unit, with an abbot as its overlord, even in the absence of a monastic community. In the 1660s these lands passed from the Holy Roman Empire to France. In the 1690s, the Prince-Abbot Eberhard von Löwenstein built an appropriately splendid residence, which still stands. At the time of the French Revolution the building was confiscated and sold off and was later used for a variety of military and local government purposes, particularly as a workhouse for the poor. The palace has now been restored and is in use as a museum, old people's home and for several other purposes. The gardens, nymphaeum and chapel are all of architectural and artistic interest.

== Protection ==
The abbey is the property of the commune. It has been listed since 1886 as a monument historique by the French Ministry of Culture.

== See also ==
- List of Carolingian monasteries
- Carolingian architecture
- Carolingian art

== Sources ==
- Lawrence, C.H., 2001. Medieval Monasticism (3rd edn.). Longman
