= Food, Agriculture, Conservation, and Trade Act of 1990 =

United States federal law

- Long title: An original bill to extend and revise agricultural price support and related programs, to provide for agricultural export, resource conservation, farm credit, and agricultural research and related programs, to ensure consumers an abundance of food and fiber at reasonable prices, and for other purposes.
- Acronyms (colloquial): FACT
- Nicknames: 1990 U.S. Farm Bill; Agricultural Development and Trade Act of 1990
- Enacted by: the 101st United States Congress
- Effective: November 28, 1990

Citations
- Public law: 101–624
- Statutes at Large: 104 Stat. 3359

Legislative history
- Introduced in the Senate as S. 2830 by Patrick Leahy (D–VT) on July 6, 1990; Committee consideration by Agriculture, Nutrition, and Forestry; Passed the Senate on July 27, 1990 (70–21); Passed the House of Representatives on August 4, 1990 (Unanimous consent); Reported by the joint conference committee on October 22, 1990; agreed to by the House of Representatives on October 23, 1990 (318–102) and by the Senate on October 25, 1990 (60–36); Signed into law by President George H. W. Bush on November 28, 1990

The Food, Agriculture, Conservation, and Trade (FACT) Act of 1990 — P.L. 101-624 (November 28, 1990) was a 5-year omnibus farm bill that passed Congress and was signed into law.

This bill, also known as the 1990 farm bill, continued to move agriculture in a market-oriented direction by freezing target prices and allowing more planting flexibility.

== Initial program ==
New titles included rural development, forestry, organic certification (Title 21), and commodity promotion programs. The law established a Rural Development Administration (RDA) in the USDA to administer programs relating to rural and small community development. It extended and modified the Food Stamp Program and other domestic nutrition programs and made major changes in the operation of P.L. 480. It revised existing law involving agricultural trade credits and guarantees. It also established that Forest Stewardship Program (FSP), the Forest Land Enhancement Program (FLEP), the Forest Legacy Program (FLP), and the Urban and Community Forestry Program (UCF).

== Changes ==
The 1990 farm bill was soon altered by the Food, Agriculture, Conservation, and Trade Act Amendments of 1991 (P.L. 102–237) to correct errors and alleviate problems in implementing the law. The amendments allowed the Farm Credit Bank for Cooperatives to make loans for agricultural exports and established a new regulatory scheme and capital standards for the Federal Agricultural Mortgage Corporation (Farmer Mac). The law also established new handling requirements for eggs to help prevent food-borne illness.

== Further changes ==
More policy changes were made by the Omnibus Budget Reconciliation Act (OBRA) of 1993 (P.L. 103–66). This law intended to reduce federal farm spending by $3 billion over 5 years by eliminating USDA's authority to waive minimum acreage set-aside requirements for wheat and corn, reducing deficiency payments to farmers participating in the 0/92 and 50/92 programs from 92% to 85% of the normal payment level, reducing the acreage to be enrolled in the Conservation Reserve Program and Wetlands Reserve Program, and requiring improvement in the actuarial soundness of the federal crop insurance program. The measure provided for a temporary moratorium on sales of synthetic bovine growth hormone and reduced the loan rate for soybeans. It reduced Market Promotion Program (MPP) funding through fiscal 1997 and provided for a series of significant MPP operational reforms. It also provided for the designation of a series of rural (and urban) empowerment and enterprise zones, eligible for special federal aid and tax credits.

== See also ==
- Dairy Export Incentive Program
- Integrated Farm Management Program
