= Wetlands Reserve Program =

US federal aid program

The Wetlands Reserve Program (WRP) was a voluntary program offering landowners the opportunity to protect, restore, and enhance wetlands on their property. The USDA Natural Resources Conservation Service (NRCS) administers the program with funding from the Commodity Credit Corporation.

The 2014 Farm Bill repealed WRP but does not affect the validity or terms of any WRP contract, agreement or easement entered into prior to the date of enactment on February 7, 2014 or any associated payments required to be made in connection with an existing WRP contract, agreement or easement. Codified at 16 USC 3865 et seq. The same legislation authorized the Agricultural Conservation Easements Program which includes enrollment options for Wetlands Reserve Easements (ACEP-WRE) along many of the same guidelines as WRP.

== Establishment ==
The WRP was established by the 1990 Farm Bill. The 1990 Farm Bill was Senate Bill S.2830 and became Public Law No: 101-624. Amendment S.AMDT.2406 (sponsored by Senator Robert Kasten) added provisions to the program.

The WRP was repealed in 2014 via the Agriculture Act of 2014, Subtitle B. https://www.congress.gov/bill/113th-congress/house-bill/2642/text?q=%7B%22search%22%3A%5B%22agricultural+act+of+2014%22%2C%22agricultural%22%2C%22act%22%2C%22of%22%2C%222014%22%5D%7D&r=1&s=10

== Provisions ==
Producers enrolling in the program must agree to implement approved wetland restoration and protection plans. In return, participating producers receive payments based on the difference in the value of their land caused by placing an easement on a portion of it. The program reached its authorized enrollment ceiling of 1,075,000 acres (4,350 km^{2}) before the 2002 farm bill (P.L. 107-171) was acted upon. The 2002 legislation reauthorized the program with mandatory funding from the Commodity Credit Corporation (CCC) through FY2007, and set a maximum enrollment ceiling of 2.275 million acres (and with an annual enrollment ceiling of 250,000 acres). The 2008 Farm Bill increased the maximum enrollment ceiling to 3,041,200 acres with a final enrollment total of 2,097,870 permanently protected acres upon program repeal in 2014

== See also ==
- Conservation Reserve Program
- Farmable Wetlands Program
