= Abbey of Saint-Èvre, Toul =

Benedictine monastery in Toul, France

Coordinates: 48.6701°N 5.8832°E

The Abbey of Saint-Èvre (French: Abbaye de Saint-Èvre de Toul or Abbaye de Saint-Epvre lès Toul) was a Benedictine, later Cluniac, monastery in Toul. Established in or just before 507, it was the oldest monastery in Lorraine and of great significance in the monastic and religious reforms in the Rhine and Moselle region of the 10th and 11th centuries.

== History ==
The abbey was located outside the city walls of Toul to the southwest, in a suburb that still bears its name. It was the oldest monastery in the Diocese of Toul but the circumstances surrounding its foundation are largely obscure. There seems no doubt however that it was indeed founded by Saint Aprus (Èvre) himself while seventh bishop of Toul, who began the construction of a church dedicated to Saint Maurice of the Theban Legion, a saint whose cult was expanding, especially in this region, during the 6th century and to whom Evre had a particular devotion. After his death in 507, only the foundations had been constructed, and the buildings were finished by his immediate successor Albaut, eighth bishop of Toul.

Miracles were reported at Evre's tomb, which became an object of pilgrimage, and as his fame grew, Saint Evre gradually replaced Saint Maurice as the abbey's patron. The church was the place of burial, not only of Saint Evre himself, but of a number of other bishops of Toul from the 6th to the 8th centuries.

The abbey figured largely in the monastic reforms of the region. It was first reformed in the 9th century by abbot Frotaire, later bishop of Toul. In the 10th century Saint Gauzelin (bishop 922 -962), previously at Fleury Abbey, introduced from there the Gorze Reform, implemented by a Fleury monk, Archambaut, in 934, and reinforced between 942 and 973 by his successor Humbert, previously a monk at Gorze Abbey and Vanne Abbey. St. Evre's in its turn became a minor spearhead for the advancement of the reform, introducing it to Montier-en-Der Abbey from 935, and to the Abbey of St. Mansuy, Toul. In about the year 1000, Berthold (bishop 996-1019) requested William of Volpiano, abbot of the Abbey of St. Benignus, Dijon, to introduce to St. Evre's the uses of Cluny, which duly took place.

The abbey was destroyed in about 1036 by Odo, Count of Blois and of Champagne, and was rebuilt by Bruno of Eguisheim, bishop of Toul from 1026 to 1052, who later became Pope Leo IX. Over the next two hundred years it prospered, and founded 12 priories. In the 13th century a hospital and a refuge for lepers were added.

In 1552, during the siege of Metz by Charles V, many of the abbey's buildings were demolished, including the church, along with other buildings standing in front of the defences of Toul. The church was rebuilt in the 17th century by the abbot Louis de Tavagny.

The monastery was dissolved during the French Revolution and sold off as national property. Nothing now remains of the extensive buildings.
