= Velm =

Village in Limburg province, Belgium

- Village
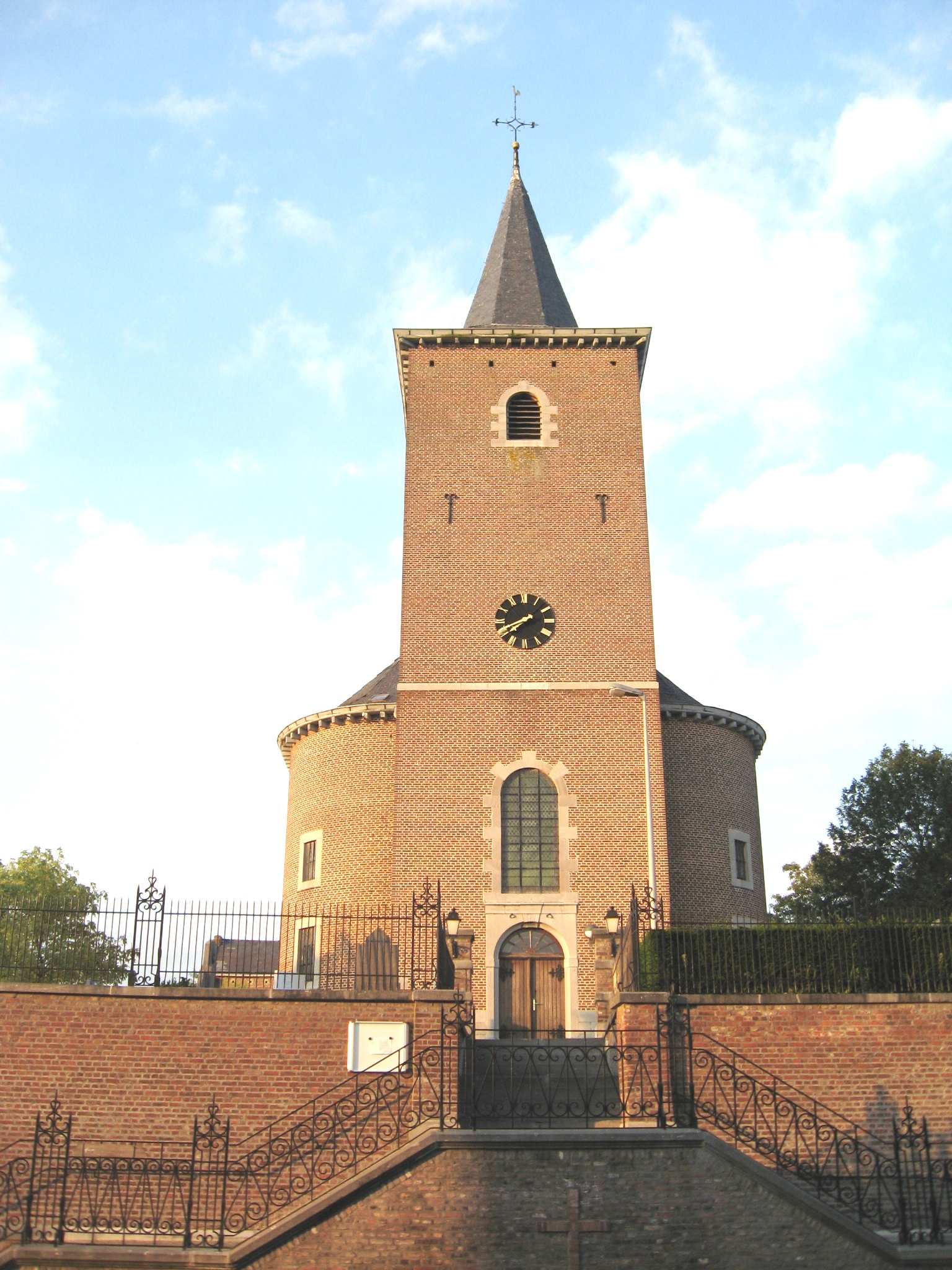
- The 18th century Church of Saint Martin

- Location in Belgium
- Coordinates: 50°46′28″N 5°08′06″E
- Country: Belgium
- Community: Flemish Community
- Province: Limburg
- Municipality: Sint-Truiden

Area
  - Total: 10.32 km^{2} (3.98 sq mi)

Population (2021)
  - Total: 2,562
  - Density: 248.3/km^{2} (643.0/sq mi)
- Time zone: CET

Velm (Dutch pronunciation: [ˈvɛl(ə)m], Limburgish: Vallem [ˈvɑləm]) is one of the ancienne communes in the municipality of Sint-Truiden, Limburg province, Belgium.

Velm is bounded in the east by the N80 motorway, leading to Namur, and in the west by the railroad from Sint-Truiden to Landen.

== History ==
Velm was mentioned for the first time in writing in 790 as Falmia. As of 982 the name of Velme can be found. Originally, Velm was a fief of the Gorze Abbey near Metz in France. In the 16th century the manor was sold to the Prince-Bishopric of Liège. Prince-bishop Érard de La Marck immediately donated the rights to the lands to the chapter of Saint Lambert in Liège.

When the communities were formed in Belgium in 1795, Velm was designated an independent municipality. Originally a rural village of farmers and fruit growers, it developed in the course of the 20th century into a residential village. In the 1977 merger of municipalities, Velm became a ancienne commune of Sint-Truiden.

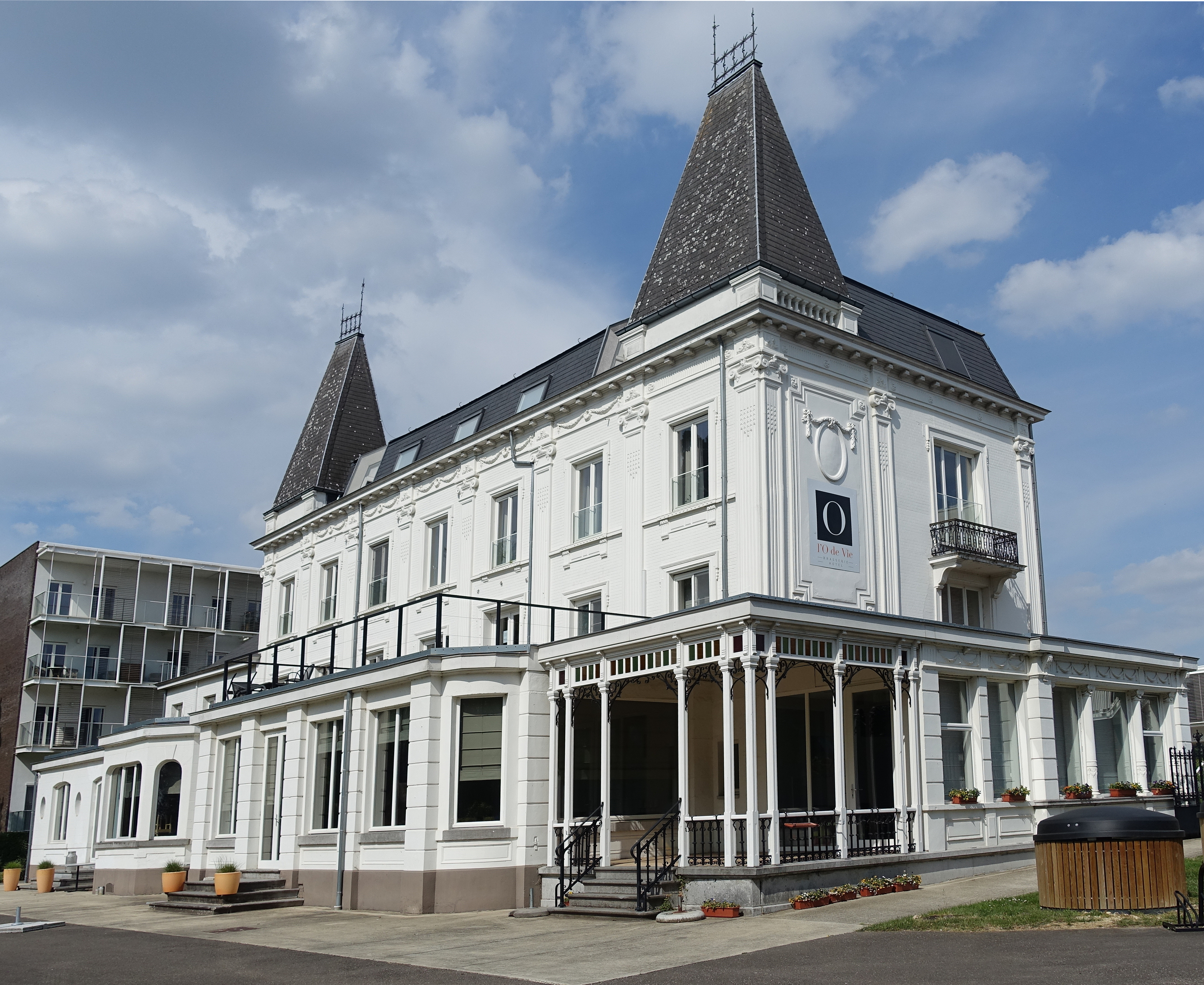
Kasteel Peten, originally built in the 19th century as a manor house

== Places of interest ==
- Church of Saint Martin, built in 1783 in the Classicism style, is dedicated to Martin of Tours. In 1912 the church was expanded by adding a transept and a choir.
- A Josephite monastery was built in the 18th century, also in the Classicism style. The building now is a language school.
- The Kasteel Peten, a neoclassical manor house of the 19th century.

== Demographic ==
Historical population

Year	Pop.	±%
1806	968	—
1816	733	−24.3%
1830	747	+1.9%
1846	785	+5.1%
1856	827	+5.4%
1866	898	+8.6%
1876	946	+5.3%

Year	Pop.	±%
1880	972	+2.7%
1890	981	+0.9%
1900	1,199	+22.2%
1910	1,535	+28.0%
1920	1,522	−0.8%
1930	1,495	−1.8%
1947	1,618	+8.2%

Year	Pop.	±%
1961	1,720	+6.3%
1970	2,075	+20.6%
1976	2,065	−0.5%
1991	2,153	+4.3%
2001	2,175	+1.0%

Source: NIS and www.limburg.be
