= Conservation Reserve Program =

U.S. federal aid program

The Conservation Reserve Program (CRP) is a cost-share and rental payment program of the United States Department of Agriculture (USDA). Under the program, the government pays farmers to take certain agriculturally used croplands out of production and convert them to vegetative cover, such as cultivated or native bunchgrasses and grasslands, wildlife and pollinators food and shelter plantings, windbreak and shade trees, filter and buffer strips, grassed waterways, and riparian buffers. The purpose of the program is to reduce land erosion, improve water quality and effect wildlife benefits.

== History ==
The program originally began in the 1950s as the conservation branch of the Soil Bank Program which was authorized by the Agricultural Act of 1956. The theory behind this branch of the Soil Bank Program was to focus on lands that were at high risk of erosion, remove them from agricultural production, and establish native or alternative permanent vegetative cover in an effort to counteract actual or potential erosion. This was considered by proponents to be beneficial to sustainable agriculture generally, by lessening the effects of erosion. Originally, the program called for three-year contracts in which the government would pay for land improvements that increased soil, water, forestry, or wildlife quality if the farmer would agree not to harvest or graze contracted land.

Although the roots of the program were established in the 1950s, advocates did not start pushing the program heavily until the 1980s, in response to more prevalent practices of the 1970s, whereby farmers increasingly began to cultivate "fencerow to fencerow", and remove native habitat and vegetative stands from the fields, which was perceived as having detrimental effects on soil, water, and habitat quality [2]. Many programs would be established in the 1980s to address these issues.

The CRP has gone through many changes. Whenever there is a new proposed Farm Bill, the CRP is a large focus due to a high level of public pressure and the program's perceived benefits.

=== 1985 Farm Bill ===
The Farm Bill of 1985 was the first act that officially established the CRP as we know it today. Many changes were made in this Farm Bill as compared to the regulations of the program set forth by the Agricultural Act of 1954. One of these changes was changing the contract lengths from the previous three-year commitment to anywhere from 10 to 15 years [7]. The rationale was that this would allow the new vegetative cover and other management practices more time to become established and produce the desired benefits. Also during the time of this Farm Bill, the amount of land allowed to be enrolled in the CRP, which had to be specified as "highly erodible," rose from 5 million acres (20,000 km^{2}) in 1986 to 40 million acres (160,000 km^{2}) in 1990 [7]. Additionally, this Farm Bill allowed the Secretary of Agriculture to provide up to 50% of the cost to landowners for installing conservation measures [7]. This Bill also prohibited any farming or grazing on land that became enrolled into CRP, effectively removing any CRP land from agricultural production [7].

=== 1990 Farm Bill ===
The Farm Bill of 1990 included a major change to the CRP by expanding the list of eligible lands to include marginal pasture lands converted to wetlands or established as wildlife habitat prior to enactment of the 1990 Farm Bill, marginal pasturelands to be devoted to trees in or near riparian areas, lands that the Secretary may determine causes an environmental threat to water quality, croplands converted to grassed waterways or strips as part of a conservation plan, croplands subject to an easement of the useful life of newly created wildlife habitat, shelterbelts, or filter strips devoted to trees or shrubs, and lands that pose an off-farm environmental threat or pose a threat of degradation of production due to soil salinity [7]. This large increase in the types of eligible lands allowed for lands that weren't really "highly erodible," yet not in production either, to be designated as beneficial to the environment around in the area.

Along with that alteration, there were other smaller differences between this Bill and the one previous. The Farm Bill of 1990 allowed limited fall and winter grazing on land enrolled in the CRP, it allowed "alley cropping" between hardwood tree stands in return for paying less money to the landowner, the 50% cost share was expanded from only vegetative cover to include hardwood trees, shelterbelts, windbreaks, and wildlife corridors, and the Bill allowed for land already in the CRP that had been converted to vegetative cover to be converted to hardwood trees, windbreaks, shelterbelts, wildlife corridors, or wetlands under certain circumstances [7]. This was a fundamental change to the Farm Bill program because it shifted the CRP's focus from agricultural conservation and production to more of a natural resource or general environmental conservation program.

=== 1996 Farm Bill ===
The 1996 Farm Bill did not make many changes to the CRP. The major change made was in relation to early termination of CRP contracts. This bill allowed the termination of contracts after five years, with the exception of filter strips, waterways, strips adjacent to riparian areas; lands with an erodibility index of over 15; and other lands that the Secretary deems to be highly sensitive [7]. Also, cropping history became a part of the eligibility system used to determine if a piece of land should be enrolled into the CRP. Land was deemed eligible for CRP if it was cropped two of the last five years and meets at least one of the following requirements: had an erodibility index of eight or higher; was considered a cropped wetland; was associated with or surrounds non-cropped wetlands; was devoted to a highly beneficial environmental practice (for example, filter strips); was subject to scour erosion; was located in national or state CRP conservation priority areas; or was marginal pastureland in riparian areas [7]. Other changes came in the form of appropriation bills. The Appropriations Bill of 2001 provided an exception to the requirement that the owner plant vegetative cover when excessive rainfall or flooding made planting impossible and the Appropriations Bill of 2002 created a new pilot program for enrollment of wetland and buffer acreage in CRP [7].

=== 2002 Farm Bill ===
The changes made to the program in the 2002 Farm Bill changed the cropping history requirements from two out of the previous five years, to four out of the previous six [7]. This was done to make sure the land being enrolled in the program was actually cropland as opposed to land where somebody cropped it for two years just so it could be enrolled. The other change was done to increase the eligibility of lands. Under this Farm Bill, land under expiring contracts is automatically eligible to be considered for re-enrollment; contracts expiring during 2002 could be extended by one year; and existing covers must be retained, if feasible, when expiring contracts are re-enrolled [7].

=== 2008 Farm Bill ===
The 2008 Farm Bill stated that alfalfa grown in approved crop rotation practice is to be considered an agricultural commodity and can be used to fulfill the requirement that eligible land be cropped in four out of six previous years, which had been challenged in the previous years [1]. Also for the first time, the bill allowed for management and cost-share incentives for thinning to improve condition of resources on the land containing trees, windbreaks, shelterbelts, and wildlife corridors [1].

== Agencies involved ==
The program is administered by three agencies within the United States Department of Agriculture (USDA): the Commodity Credit Corporation (CCC), the Farm Service Agency (FSA) and the Natural Resources Conservation Service (NRCS). The USDA works to form the CRP with every Farm Bill. The CCC is a federal corporation, which is controlled by the USDA, that provides funding for CRP and other conservation programs. FSA is the agency that runs the program. NRCS is the agency that provides technical assistance in the planning and mid-contract management stages.

== Enrollment procedures ==
Even though the CRP may be beneficial to many aspects of the environment, not every landowner can or might want to become involved in the program.

The main limiting factor in the amount of land allowed in the program is money. Each Farm Bill establishes the amount of money that will be budgeted for rental payments and cost share subsidies. With a limited amount of money available, the NRCS can only allow the most qualified land to be given incentive payments. There are very specific procedures and steps that are taken to decide whether or not land will be admitted to the program.

Moreover, CRP is considered to be undesirable by some land owners because it prevents or minimizes the use of their land for agricultural production and by decreasing farm income.

Continuous Sign-Up Contracts: Environmentally desirable land devoted to certain conservation practices may be enrolled in CRP at any time under continuous sign-up [10]. Provided the land and the landowner meet the requirements, offers are automatically accepted and not subject to competitive bidding [10].

=== Landowner requirements ===
To be eligible for CRP continuous sign-up enrollment, a landowner must have owned or operated the land for at least 12 months prior to submitting the offer, unless: the new landowner acquired the land due to the previous landowner's death, ownership change occurred due to foreclosure where the owner exercised a timely right or redemption in accordance with state law, or the circumstances of the acquisition present adequate assurance to FSA that the new owner did not acquire the land for the purpose of placing it in CRP [10]. Landowners must be U.S. citizens or resident aliens and may not exceed certain income thresholds in order to be eligible for payments.

=== Land requirements ===
To be eligible for placement in General CRP, land must be recognized as "cropland" (including field margins) that is planted or considered planted to an agricultural commodity 4 of the previous 6 crop years from 1996 to 2001, and which is physically and legally capable of being planted in a normal manner to an agricultural commodity. For Continuous CRP the land must be recognized as "marginal pastureland" that is bordered to a stream, creek, river, sink-hole, and/or duck nest. Also, the land must be suitable for certain conservation practices; which are riparian buffers, wildlife habitat buffers, wetland buffers, filter strips, wetland restoration, grass waterways, shelterbelts, living snow fences, contour grass strips, salt tolerant vegetation, and shallow water areas for wildlife [10].

== Contract payments ==
There are three main types of payments within CRP. They are rental payments, cost-share assistance, and financial incentives.

=== Rental payments ===
Landowners receive rental payments from the FSA in return for creating long-term land cover. These payments depend on two main factors: The productivity of the soils in the area and the average dry land crop rent or cash rent equivalent [10]. However, the annual rental rate may not exceed the FSA's maximum payment amount [10].

=== Cost-share assistance ===
FSA provides cost-share assistance to participants who establish approved cover on eligible cropland. The cost-share assistance can be an amount not more than 50 percent of the participants' costs in establishing approved practices [10].

=== Financial incentives ===
As part of or on top of rental rate agreements, the FSA also adds on an additional financial incentive of up to 20% of the soil-rental rate for field windbreaks, grass waterways, filter strips, and riparian buffers [10]. Also, additional percentages could be added to the amount for maintenance and upkeep of the CRP areas [10].

== Environmental benefits ==
CRP benefits many native plants, animals and ecosystems. Even something as simple as a filter strip between an agricultural field and a stream can have a profound effect on the stability and health of the ecosystems and processes that occur in and around the field, as the greater environment.

=== Soil erosion ===
When CRP first started, the primary goal was to curb soil erosion due to agricultural practices. The effects of CRP on erosion are clearly visible today. CRP protects soil productivity by establishing conservation covers on at-risk land to reduce sheet, rill, and wind erosion. As of December 1, 2015, CRP has prevented more than 9 billion tons of soil from eroding.

=== Water quality ===
One of the most important benefits provided by CRP is the improvement of water quality by reducing soil erosion and surface runoff to water bodies. The more common runoff materials from agricultural lands included chemical fertilizers, nutrient pollution (nitrogen and phosphorus), and sediments. These pollutants which all have the potential to alter the environmental health of water bodies. Filter strips and buffer strips along the edge of agricultural fields can intercept the runoff materials and keep them from leaving the field. The Food and Agricultural Policy Research Institute (FAPRI) estimated 278 million pounds less nitrogen and 59 million pounds less phosphorus left fields in 2007 due to CRP, 95 and 86 percent reductions, respectively.

== Wildlife benefits ==
CRP also benefits wildlife, most notably, birds. The most visible increase in bird population has occurred for native birds such as the Prairie Pothole Duck, Redhead (duck), Sage grouse, grassland birds, and a non-native migratory species, the ring-necked pheasants:

- The ducks in the Prairie Pothole Region have seen a 30-percent increase in population since 1992;
- The introduction of CRP in sage grouse territory has slowed the decline of these birds by 25 percent between 1970 and 1988; and
- Studies have estimated that without the influx of CRP lands, grassland bird populations in the Prairie Pothole region might have declined anywhere from 2 to 52 percent [12].
- Research has shown that a four-percent increase in CRP lands in prime pheasant regions has led to a 22-percent increase in ring-necked pheasant populations.

== See also ==
- Conservation Security Program
- Edge effect
- Environmental Quality Incentives Program
- Farmable Wetlands Program
- Habitat conservation
- Overgrazing
- Soil Bank Program
- Wetlands Reserve Program
- Wilderness Act
