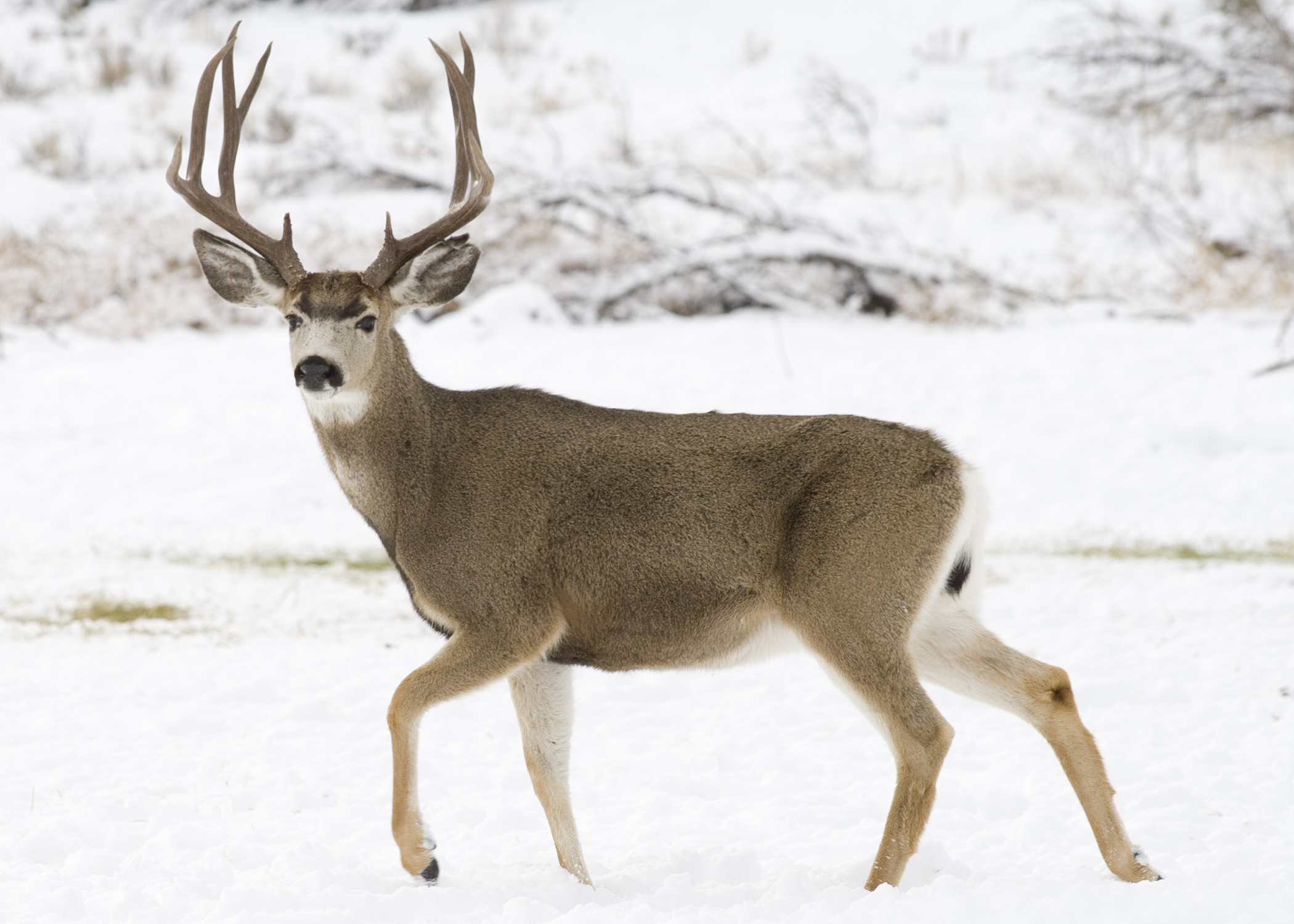
- Male (buck) near Elk Creek, Oregon
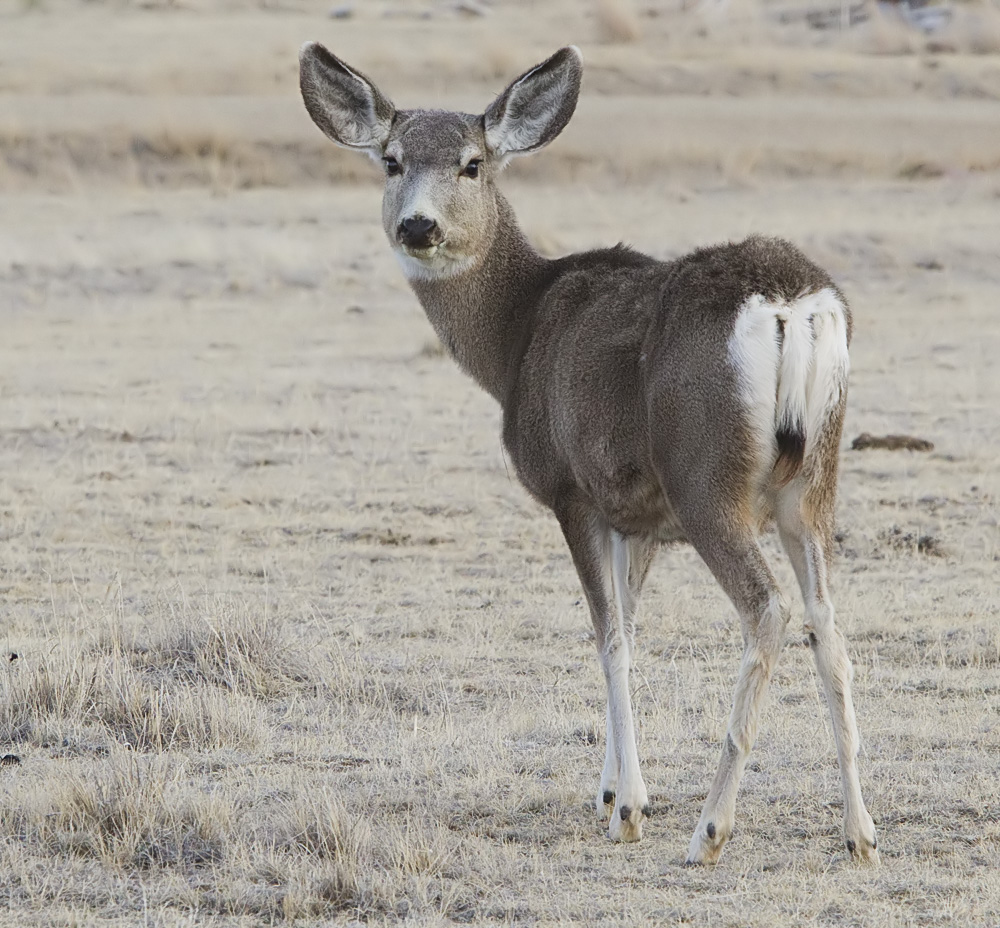
- Female (doe)

Conservation status
- Least Concern (IUCN 3.1)

Scientific classification
- Kingdom: Animalia
- Phylum: Chordata
- Class: Mammalia
- Order: Artiodactyla
- Family: Cervidae
- Subfamily: Capreolinae
- Genus: Odocoileus
- Species: O. hemionus

Binomial name
- Odocoileus hemionus Rafinesque, 1817

Subspecies
- 10, but some disputed (see text)
- Distribution map of subspecies: Sitka black-tailed deer (O. h. sitkensis) Columbian black-tailed deer (O. h. columbianus) California mule deer (O. h. californicus) southern mule deer (O. h. fuliginatus) peninsular mule deer (O. h. peninsulae) desert mule deer (O. h. eremicus) Rocky Mountain mule deer (O. h. hemionus)

Synonyms
- Cervus hemionus Rafinesque, 1817; Cervus auritus Warden, 1820; Cervus macrotis Say, 1823; Cervus lewisii Peale, 1848; Cariacus punctulatus Gray, 1852; Cervus richardsoni Audubon & Bahman, 1848; Eucervus pusilla Gray, 1873; Dorcelaphus crooki Mearns, 1897; Cariacus virgultus Hallock, 1899

= Mule deer =

Deer indigenous to western North America

male O. h. hemionus with antlers in velvet, Banff, Alberta

The mule deer (Odocoileus hemionus) is a deer indigenous to western North America; it is named for its ears, which are large like those of the mule. Two subspecies of mule deer are grouped into the black-tailed deer.

Mule deer are found in the western and central parts of North America. Various subspecies range from the western Great Plains to the Rocky Mountains, the southwest United States and northern Mexico, and the west coast of the continent. Their range is smaller than the related white-tailed deer, which are found throughout most of North America east of the Rocky Mountains and in the valleys of the Rocky Mountains from Idaho and Wyoming northward. Mule deer have also been introduced to Argentina and Kauai, Hawaii.

== Taxonomy ==
Mule deer can be divided into two main groups: the mule deer (sensu stricto) and the black-tailed deer. The first group includes all subspecies, except O. h. columbianus and O. h. sitkensis, which are in the black-tailed deer group. The two main groups have been treated as separate species, but they hybridize, and virtually all recent authorities treat the mule deer and black-tailed deer as conspecific. Mule deer apparently evolved from the black-tailed deer. Despite this, the mtDNA of the white-tailed deer and mule deer is similar, but differs from that of the black-tailed deer. This may be the result of introgression, although hybrids between the mule deer and white-tailed deer are rare in the wild (apparently more common locally in West Texas), and the hybrid survival rate is low even in captivity. Many claims of observations of wild hybrids are not legitimate, as identification based on external features is complicated.

=== Subspecies ===
Some authorities have recognized O. h. crooki as a senior synonym of O. h. eremicus, but the type specimen of the former is a hybrid between the mule deer and white-tailed deer, so the name O. h. crooki is invalid. Additionally, the validity of O. h. inyoensis has been questioned, and the two insular O. h. cerrosensis and O. h. sheldoni may be synonyms of O. h. eremicus or O. h. peninsulae.

The 10 valid subspecies, based on the third edition of Mammal Species of the World, are:

- Mule deer (sensu stricto) group:
  - O. h. californicus – California mule deer. This widespread subspecies is found throughout much of California (north of San Diego and Imperial), with high densities in Orange and Los Angeles Counties to coastal Santa Barbara, Ventura, and San Luis Obispo; from Morro Bay to Santa Cruz, along the coast, its range is somewhat patchier. Inland, the California mule deer is known from around San Bernardino to as far north as Lassen; many deer inhabit the areas in and around Sequoia National Park, Yosemite, Plumas National Forest, and of course, the Sierra Nevada, its range partly overlapping with that of the Inyo subspecies (O. h. inyoensis). It is notably absent from the Central Valley and the agricultural districts of the state (roughly between Bakersfield and Sacramento); north of San Francisco, it is replaced by the Columbian subspecies (O. h. columbianus). It is also known to range across the border into west-central Nevada, between Reno and Carson City.
  - O. h. cerrosensis – Cedros or Cerros Island mule deer, after Cedros Island, off of the southwestern Pacific coast of Baja California state, the subspecies' sole habitat.
  - O. h. eremicus – Desert or burro mule deer. Primarily found in the Lower Colorado River Valley, Southern California's Inland Empire, the areas around Las Vegas and extreme southern Nevada, much of Arizona and parts of southern New Mexico. In Mexico, it is primarily known from Sonora, having been known from as far south as Hermosillo; it has also been observed (somewhat out-of-range) in Coahuila, Chihuahua and Durango.
  - O. h. fuliginatus – Southern mule deer. Mainly found in Southern California (Los Angeles, Orange and San Diego Counties) and along the U.S.-Mexico borderlands, into the northern half of the Baja California Peninsula, where it has been sighted as far south as El Rosario. Notably high population densities occur to the west of Anza-Borrego Desert State Park (in the San Diego County portion of the Cleveland National Forest) and in and around the region of Julian, California.
  - O. h. hemionus – Rocky Mountain mule deer. Primarily found in western and central North America, as far south as Colorado and as far north as Yukon and the Northwest Territories, including inland British Columbia.
  - O. h. inyoensis – Inyo mule deer (named after Inyo County, California). This deer is primarily found within the Sierra Nevada and Yosemite, within inland Central California, and has been sighted as far south as Death Valley and as far north as the Stanislaus National Forest.
  - O. h. peninsulae – Baja or Peninsular mule deer; found across the majority of the state of Baja California Sur, Mexico.
  - O. h. sheldoni – Tiburón Island mule deer, also called the venado bura de Tiburón in Spanish. This deer is only found on Tiburón Island, Mexico, in the Gulf of California.
- Black-tailed deer group:
  - O. h. columbianus – Columbian black-tailed deer; found primarily in coastal temperate rainforest habitats of the Pacific Northwest and Northern California (north of approx. the San Francisco Bay Area to Vancouver, British Columbia)
  - O. h. sitkensis – Sitka black-tailed deer (named after Sitka, Alaska); found in similar temperate rainforests as the Columbian subspecies – though with a more northerly range – from the central coast of British Columbia (including Haida Gwaii) throughout Southeast Alaska (along the Gulf of Alaska), with smaller populations further north to Anchorage, the Kenai Peninsula, and Kodiak Island. Found typically in dense, lush habitats, such as the Great Bear Rainforest and Tongass National Forest.

== Description ==
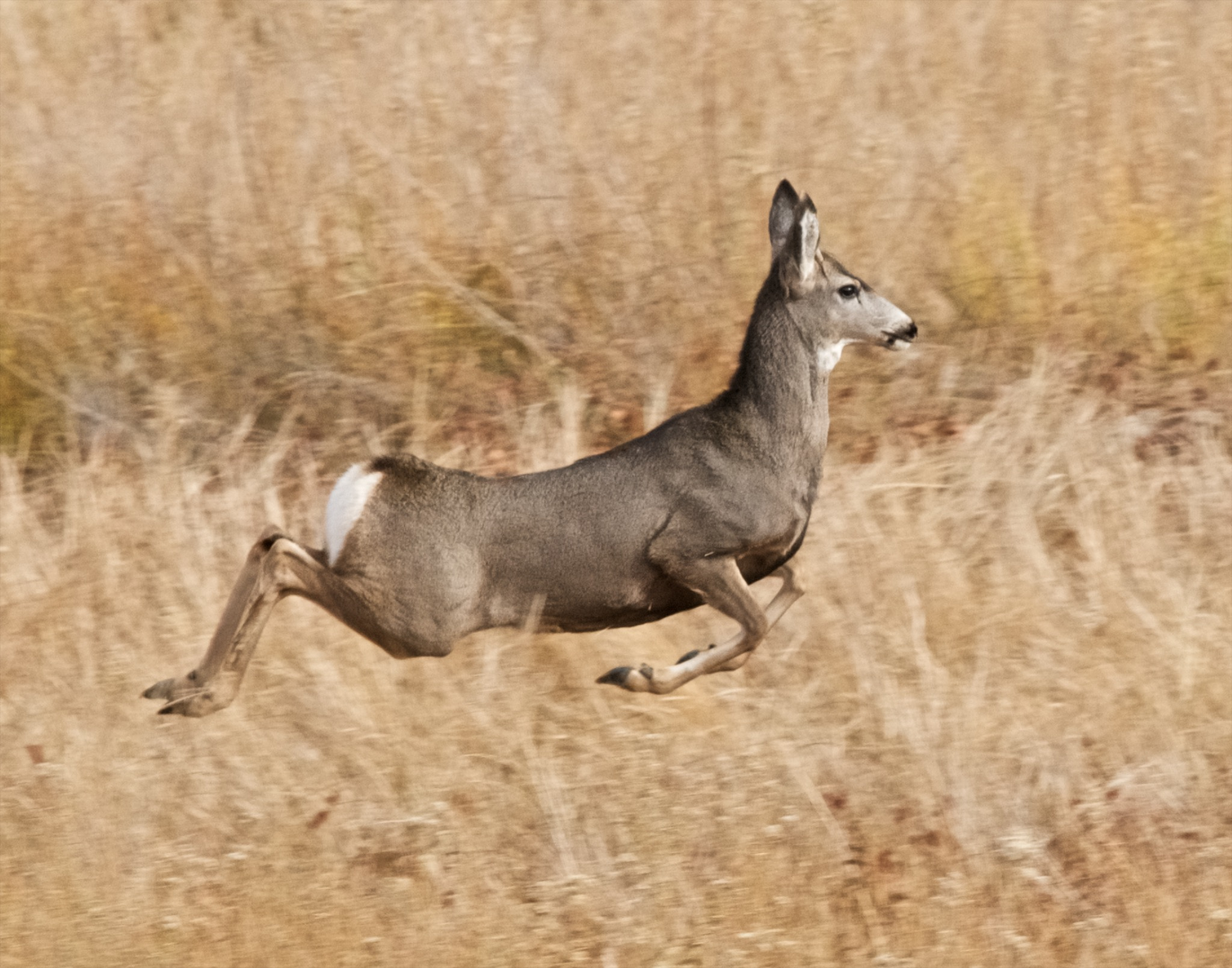
Stotting mule deer

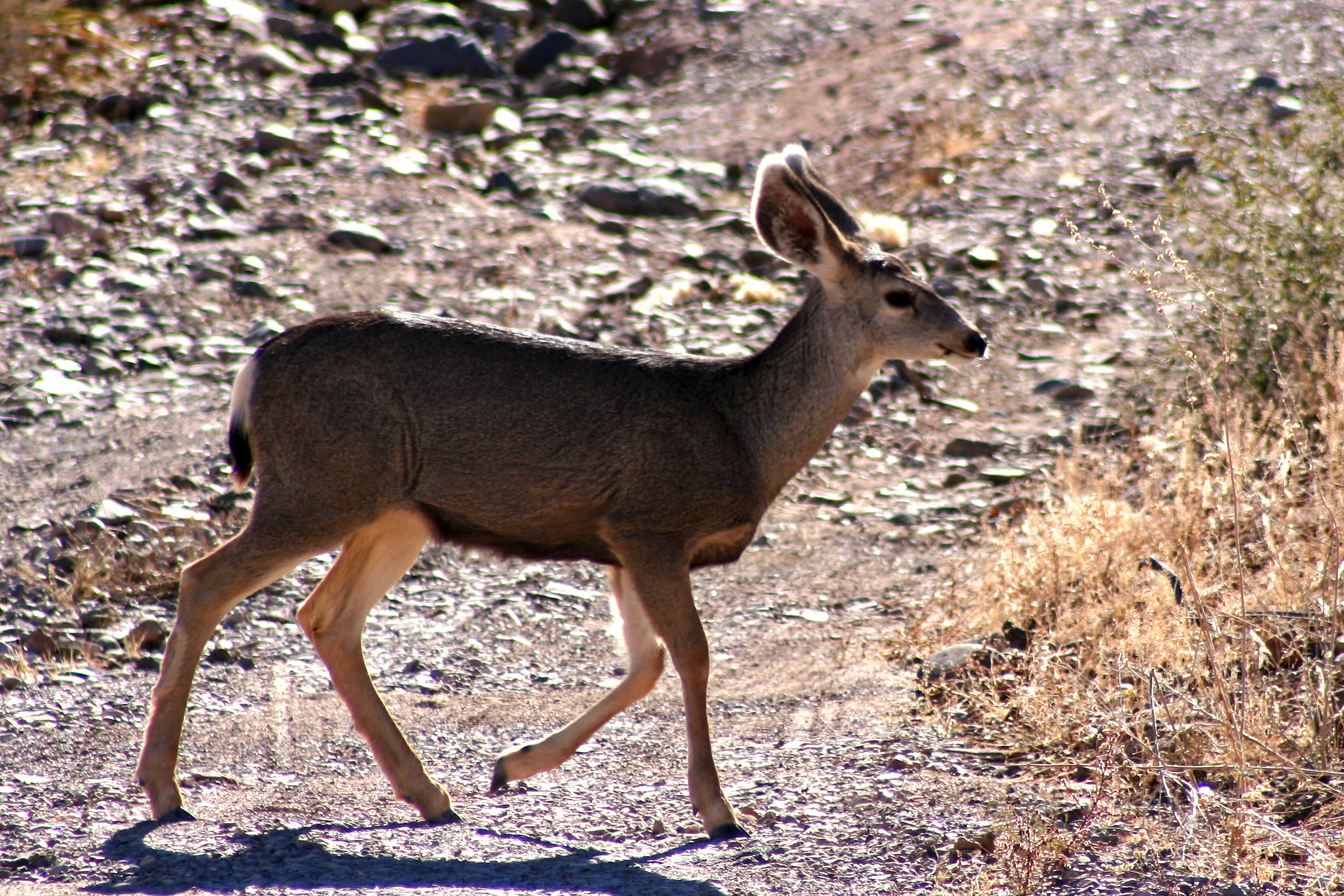
Female desert/burro mule deer (O. h. eremicus) in Truth or Consequences, New Mexico

The most noticeable differences between white-tailed and mule deer are ear size, tail color, and antler configuration. In many cases, body size is also a key difference. The mule deer's tail is black-tipped, whereas the white-tailed deer's is not. Mule deer antlers are bifurcated; they "fork" as they grow, rather than branching from a single main beam, as is the case with white-tails.

Each spring, a buck's antlers start to regrow almost immediately after the old antlers are shed. Shedding typically takes place in mid-February, with variations occurring by locale.

Although capable of running, mule deer are often seen stotting (also called pronking), with all four feet coming down together.

The mule deer is the larger of the three Odocoileus species on average, with a height of 80–106 cm (31–42 in) at the shoulders and a nose-to-tail length ranging from 1.2 to 2.1 m (3.9 to 6.9 ft). Of this, the tail may comprise 11.6 to 23 cm (4.6 to 9.1 in). Adult bucks normally weigh 55–150 kg (121–331 lb), averaging around 92 kg (203 lb), although trophy specimens may weigh up to 210 kg (460 lb). Does (female deer) are smaller and typically weigh from 43 to 90 kg (95 to 198 lb), with an average of around 68 kg (150 lb).

Unlike the white-tailed, the mule deer does not generally show marked size variation across its range, although environmental conditions can cause considerable weight fluctuations in any given population. An exception to this is the Sitka deer subspecies (O. h. sitkensis). This race is markedly smaller than other mule deer, with an average weight of 54.5 kg (120 lb) and 36 kg (79 lb) in males and females, respectively.

== Seasonal behaviors ==
In addition to movements related to available shelter and food, the breeding cycle is important in understanding deer behavior. The rut or mating season usually begins in the fall as does go into estrus for a period of a few days, and males become more aggressive, competing for mates. Does may mate with more than one buck and go back into estrus within a month if they did not become pregnant. The gestation period is about 190–200 days, with fawns born in the spring. The survival rate of the fawns during labor is about 50%. Fawns stay with their mothers during the summer and are weaned in the fall after about 60–75 days. Mule deer females usually give birth to two fawns, although if it is their first time having a fawn, they often have just one.

A buck's antlers fall off during the winter, then grow again in preparation for the next season's rut. The annual cycle of antler growth is regulated by changes in the length of the day.

The size of mule deer groups follows a marked seasonal pattern. Groups are smallest during fawning season (June and July in Saskatchewan and Alberta) and largest in early gestation (winter; February and March in Saskatchewan and Alberta).

Besides humans, the three leading predators of mule deer are coyotes, wolves, and cougars. Bobcats, Canada lynx, wolverines, American black bears, and grizzly bears may prey upon adult deer but most often attack only fawns or infirm specimens, or they may eat a deer after it has died naturally. Bears and small carnivores are typically opportunistic feeders and pose little threat to a strong, healthy mule deer.

== Diet and foraging behaviors ==
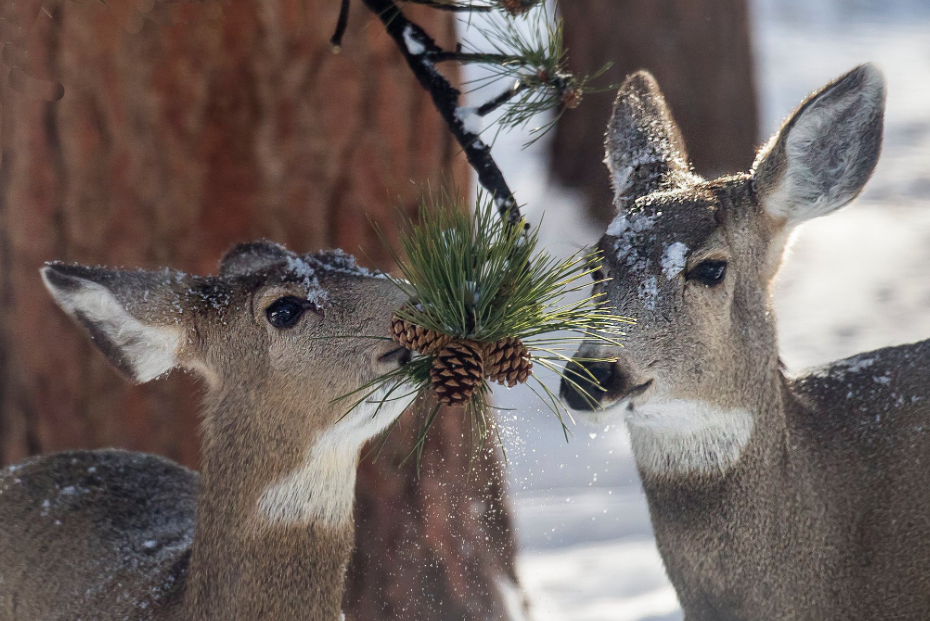
Two mule deer contemplating eating pine cones, Rocky Mountain National Park

In 99 studies of mule deer diets, some 788 species of plants were eaten by mule deer, and their diets vary greatly depending on the season, geographic region, year, and elevation. The studies gave these data for Rocky Mountain mule deer diets:

	Shrubs and trees	Forbs	Grasses and grass-like plants
Winter	74%	15%	11% (varies 0–53%)
Spring	49%	25%	26% (varies 4–64%)
Summer	49%	46% (varies 3–77%)	3% (varies 0–22%)
Fall	60%	30% (varies 2–78%)	9% (varies 0–24%)

The diets of mule deer are very similar to those of white-tailed deer in areas where they coexist. Mule deer are intermediate feeders rather than pure browsers or grazers; they predominantly browse but also eat forb vegetation, small amounts of grass and, where available, tree or shrub fruits such as beans, pods, nuts (including acorns), and berries. Carbon isotopic study of mule deer in Yellowstone has shown them, along with elk, to be the most generalist large herbivores of the region.

Mule deer readily adapt to agricultural products and landscape plantings. In the Sierra Nevada range, mule deer depend on the lichen Bryoria fremontii as a winter food source.

The most common plant species consumed by mule deer are the following:

- Among trees and shrubs: Artemisia tridentata (big sagebrush), Cercocarpus ledifolius (curlleaf mountain mahogany), Cercocarpus montanus (true mountain mahogany), Cowania mexicana (Mexican cliffrose), Populus tremuloides (quaking aspen), Purshia tridentata (antelope bitterbrush), Quercus gambelii (Gambel oak), and Rhus trilobata (skunkbush sumac).
- Among forbs: Achillea millefolium (western yarrow), Antennaria (pussytoes) species, Artemisia frigida (fringed sagebrush), Artemisia ludoviciana (Louisiana sagewort), Aster species, Astragalus (milkvetch) species, Balsamorhiza sagittata (arrowleaf balsamroot), Cirsium (thistle) species, Erigeron (fleabane) species, Geranium species, Lactuca serriola (prickly lettuce), Lupinus (lupine) species, alfalfa, Penstemon species, Phlox species, Polygonum (knotweed/smartweed) species, Potentilla (cinquefoil) species, Taraxacum officinale (dandelion), Tragopogon dubius (western salsify), clover, and Vicia americana (American vetch).
- Among grasses and grasslike species: Agropyron, Elymus (wheatgrasses), Pascopyrum species (wheatgrasses), Pseudoroegneria spicatum (bluebunch wheatgrass), Bromus tectorum (cheatgrass), Carex (sedge) species, Festuca idahoensis (Idaho fescue), Poa fendleriana (muttongrass), Poa pratensis (Kentucky bluegrass), and other Poa (bluegrass) species.

Mule deer have also been known to eat ricegrass, gramagrass, and needlegrass, as well as bearberry, bitter cherry, black oak, California buckeye, ceanothus, cedar, cliffrose, cottonwood, creek dogwood, creeping barberry, dogwood, Douglas fir, elderberry, Fendlera species, goldeneye, holly-leaf buckthorn, jack pine, knotweed, Kohleria species, manzanita, mesquite, pine, rabbitbrush, ragweed, redberry, scrub oak, serviceberry (including Pacific serviceberry), Sierra juniper, silktassel, snowberry, stonecrop, sunflower, tesota, thimbleberry, turbinella oak, velvet elder, western chokecherry, wild cherry, and wild oats. Where available, mule deer also eat a variety of wild mushrooms, which are most abundant in late summer and fall in the southern Rocky Mountains; mushrooms provide moisture, protein, phosphorus, and potassium.

Humans sometimes engage in supplemental feeding efforts in severe winters in an attempt to help mule deer avoid starvation. Wildlife agencies discourage such efforts, which cause harm to mule deer populations by spreading disease (such as tuberculosis and chronic wasting disease) when deer congregate for feed, disrupting migratory patterns, causing overpopulation of local mule deer populations, and causing habitat destruction from overbrowsing of shrubs and forbs. Supplemental feeding efforts might be appropriate when carefully conducted under limited circumstances, but to be successful, the feeding must begin early in the severe winter (before poor range conditions and severe weather cause malnourishment or starvation) and must be continued until range conditions can support the herd.

Mule deer are variably gregarious, with a large proportion of solitary individuals (35 to 64%) and small groups (groups with ≤5 deer, 50 to 78%). Reported mean group size measurements are three to five and typical group size (i.e., crowding) is about seven.

Mule deer foraging on a late winter morning at Okanagan Mountain Provincial Park

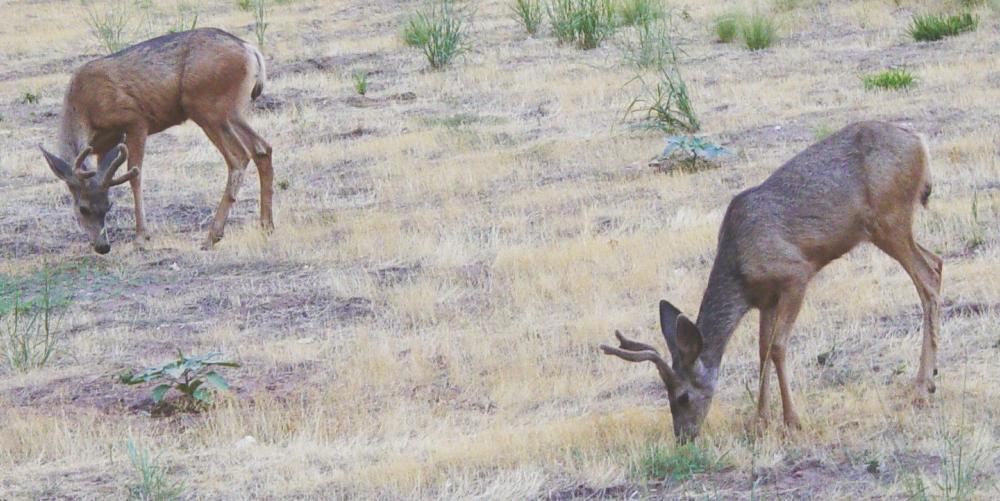
Male Rocky Mountain mule deer (O. h. hemionus) in Zion National Park

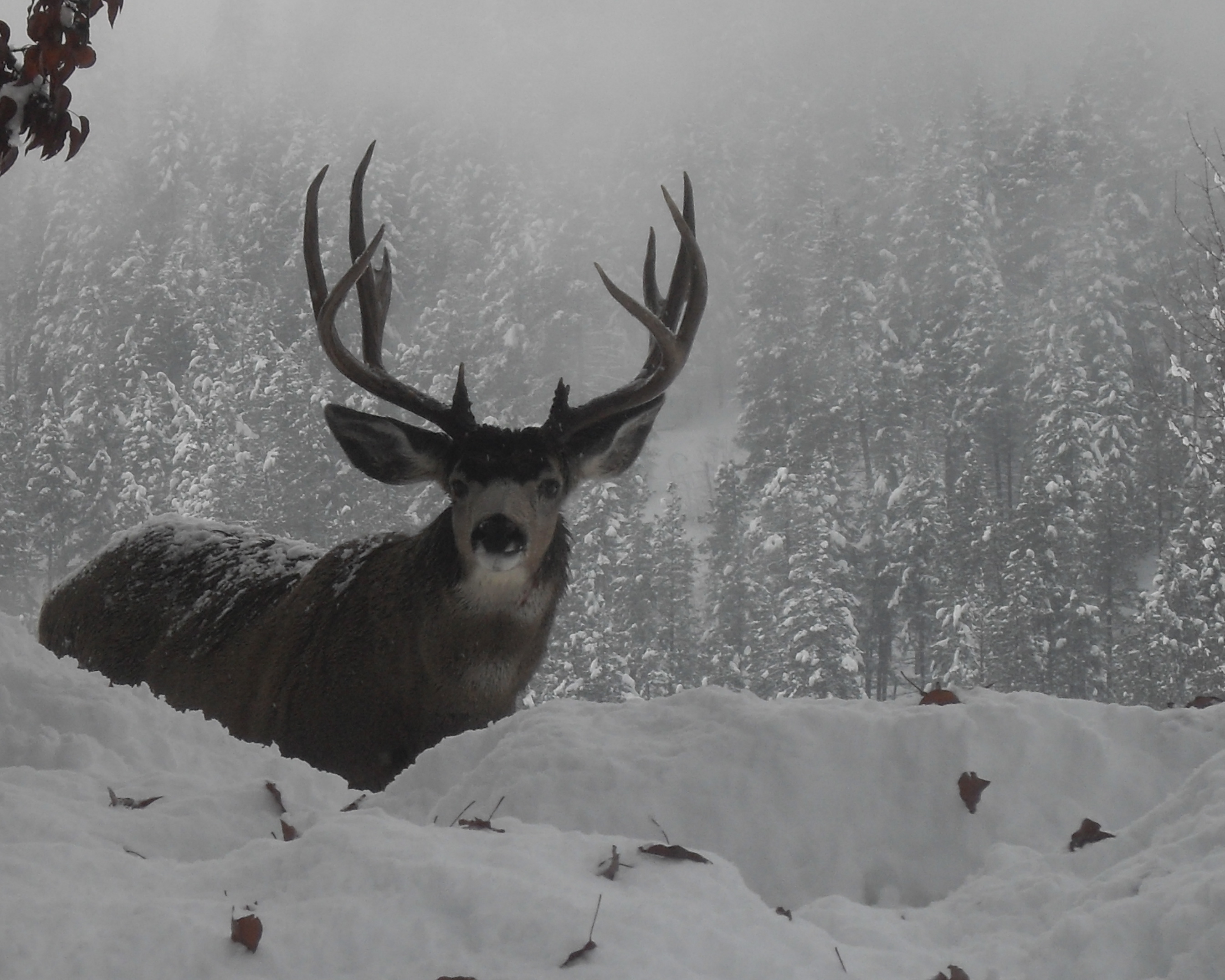
Male O. h. hemionus near Leavenworth, Washington

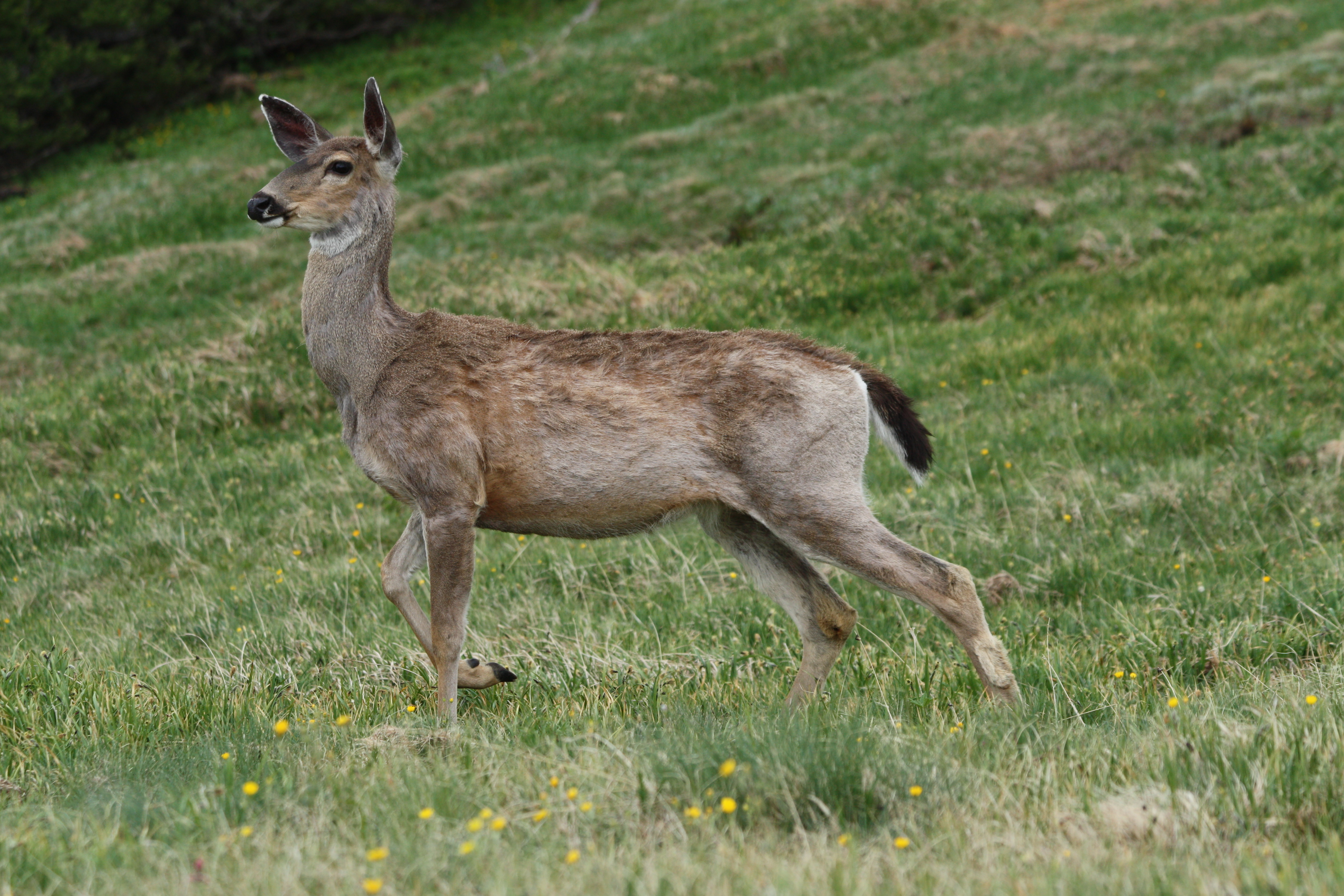
Female Columbian black-tailed deer (O. h. columbianus) in Olympic National Park

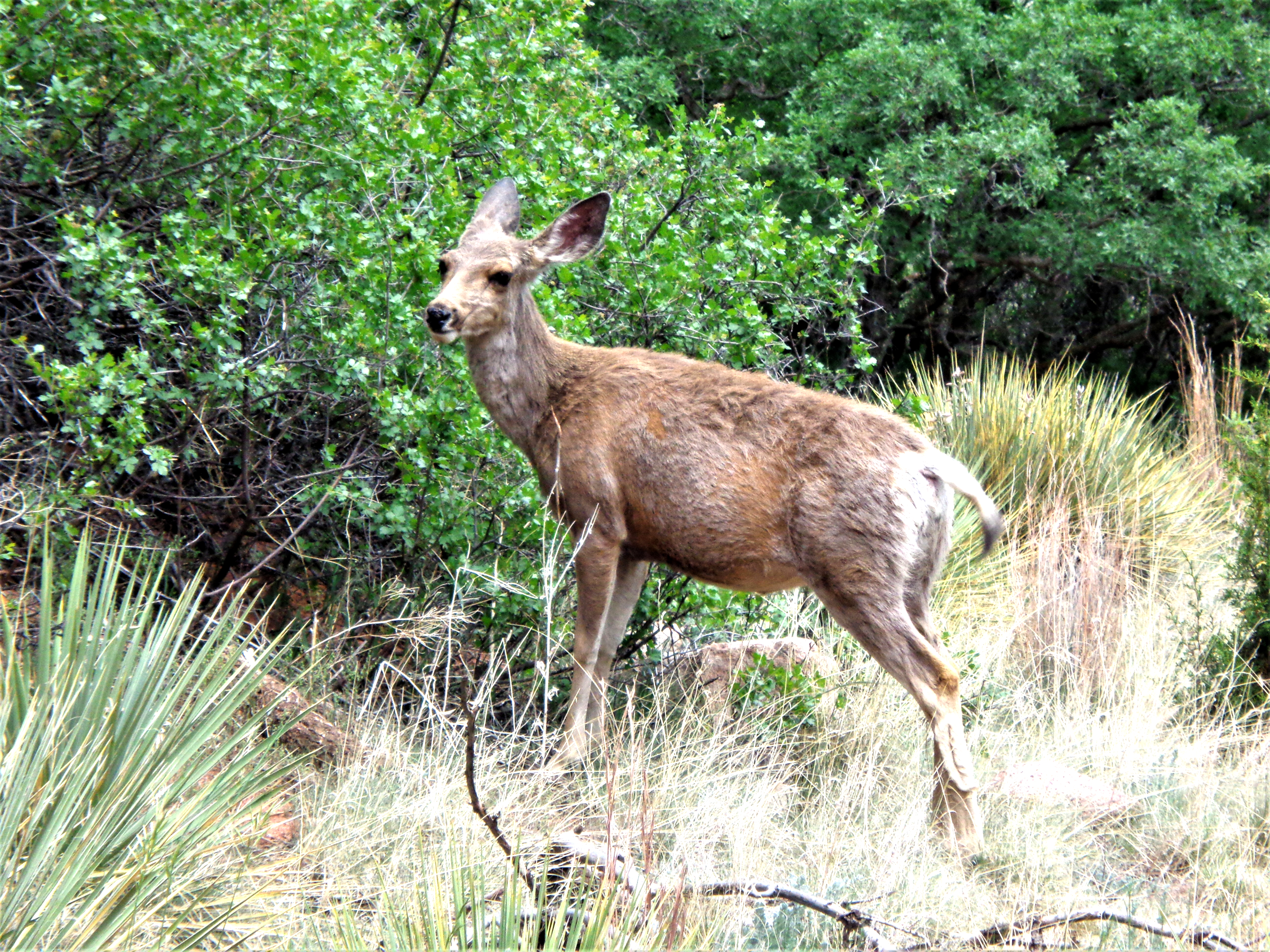
Female mule deer in Garden of the Gods, Colorado Springs, Colorado, US

== Nutrition ==
Mule deer are ruminants, meaning they employ a nutrient acquisition strategy of fermenting plant material before digesting it. Deer consuming high-fiber, low-starch diets require less food than those consuming high-starch, low-fiber diets. Rumination time also increases when deer consume high-fiber, low-starch diets, which allows for increased nutrient acquisition due to greater length of fermentation. Because some of the subspecies of mule deer are migratory, they encounter variable habitats and forage quality throughout the year. Forages consumed in the summer are higher in digestible components (i.e. proteins, starches, sugars, and hemicellulose) than those consumed in the winter. The average gross energy content of the consumed forage material is 4.5 kcal/g.

Due to fluctuations in forage quality and availability, mule deer fat storage varies throughout the year, with the most fat stored in October, which is depleted throughout the winter to the lowest levels of fat storage in March. Changes in hormone levels are indications of physiological adjustments to the changes in the habitat. Total body fat is a measure of the individual's energy reserves, while thyroid hormone concentrations are a metric to determine the deer's ability to use the fat reserves. Triiodothyronine (T3) hormone is directly involved with basal metabolic rate and thermoregulation.

== Migration ==
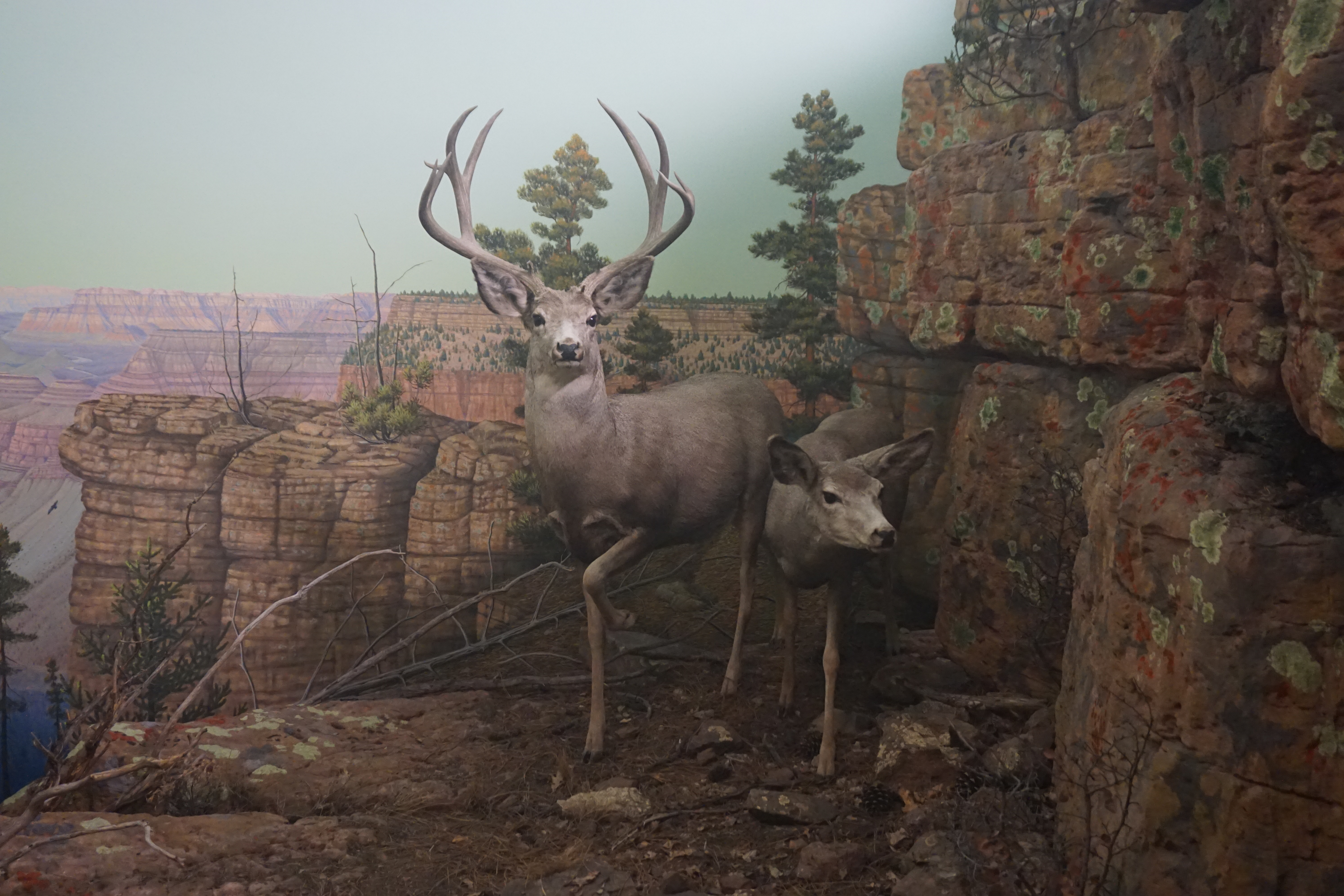
The Grand Canyon, Mule Deer diorama at the Milwaukee Public Museum

Mule deer migrate from low elevation winter ranges to high elevation summer ranges. Although not all individuals in populations migrate, some will travel long distances between summer and winter ranges. Researchers discovered the longest mule deer migration in Wyoming spanning 150 miles from winter to summer range. Multiple US states track mule deer migrations.

Mule deer migrate in fall to avoid harsh winter conditions like deep snow that covers up food resources, and in spring follow the emergence of new growth northwards. There is evidence to suggest that mule deer migrate based on cognitive memory, meaning they use the same path year after year even if the availability of resources has changed. This contradicts the idea that animals will go to the areas with the best available resources, which makes migratory paths crucial for survival.

=== Risks ===
There are many risks that mule deer face during migration including climate change and human disturbance. Climate change impacts on seasonal growth patterns constitute a risk for migrating mule deer by invalidating historic or learned migration paths.

Human activities such as natural resource extraction, highways, fencing, and urban development all have an impact on mule deer populations and migrations through habitat degradation and fragmentation. Natural gas extraction has been found to have varying negative effects on mule deer behavior and can even cause them to avoid areas they use to migrate. Highways not only cause injury and death to mule deer, but they can also serve as a barrier to migration. As traffic volumes increase, the more mule deer tend to avoid those areas and abandon their typical migration routes. It has also been found that fencing can alter deer behavior, acting as a barrier, and potentially changing mule deer migration patterns. In addition, urban development has replaced mule deer habitat with subdivisions, and human activity has increased. As a result of this, researchers have seen a decline in mule deer populations. This is especially prominent in Colorado where the human population has grown by over 2.2 million since 1980.

=== Management ===
==== Migration corridors ====
Migration corridors are essential to maintain healthy mule deer populations. As they allow for deer to safely cross areas without being harmed by urban development.

Cleaner energy

Another important precaution to protect the species is combating the increase in climate change by using greener energy sources and reducing the amount of waste in households. In addition, managers and researchers can assess the risks listed above and take the proper steps to mitigate any adverse impacts those risk have on mule deer populations. Not only will populations benefit from these efforts but so will many other wildlife species.

==== Highways ====
Installing high fence wildlife fencing with escape routes in equally important in mule deer from harm. As it prevents deer-based collisions, allows animals such as mule deer to safely cross the road, and prevent them from becoming trapped in roads and passage-ways However, to maintain migration routes that cross busy highways, managers have also implemented natural, vegetated, overpasses and underpasses to allow mule deer, along with other animals, to migrate and move safely across highways.

==== Natural resource extraction ====
Approaches to mitigating the impact of drilling and mining operations include regulating the time of year when active drilling and heavy traffic to sites are taking place, and using well-informed planning to protect critical deer habitat and using barriers to mitigate the activity, noise, light at the extraction sites.

==== Urban development ====
The increase in urbanization has impacted mule deer migrations and there is evidence to show it also disrupts gene flow among mule deer populations. One clear option is to not build houses in critical mule deer habitat; however, building near mule deer habitat has resulted in some deer becoming accustomed to humans and the resources, such as food and water. Rather than migrate through urban areas some deer tend to stay close to those urban developments, potentially for resources and to avoid the obstacles in urban areas. Suggested measures by property owners to protect mule deer genetic diversity and migration paths include planting deer-resistant plants, placing scare devices such as noise-makers, and desisting from feeding deer.

== Disease ==
Wildlife officials in Utah announced that a November–December 2021 field study had detected the first case of SARS-CoV-2 in mule deer. Several deer possessed apparent SARS-CoV-2 antibodies, however a female deer in Morgan County had an active Delta variant infection. White-tailed deer, which are able to hybridize with mule deer and which have shown high rates of SARS-CoV-2 infection, have migrated into Morgan County and other traditional mule deer habitats since at least the early 2000s.

=== Chronic wasting disease ===
Chronic wasting disease (CWD) is a disease rapidly spreading throughout populations of the Cervus family. It first appeared in captive deer in Colorado in 1967 but has made a large impact on wild mule deer populations since then, spreading throughout all of North America.
