= Fishtail Mesa =

Mesa in Arizona (western Grand Canyon)

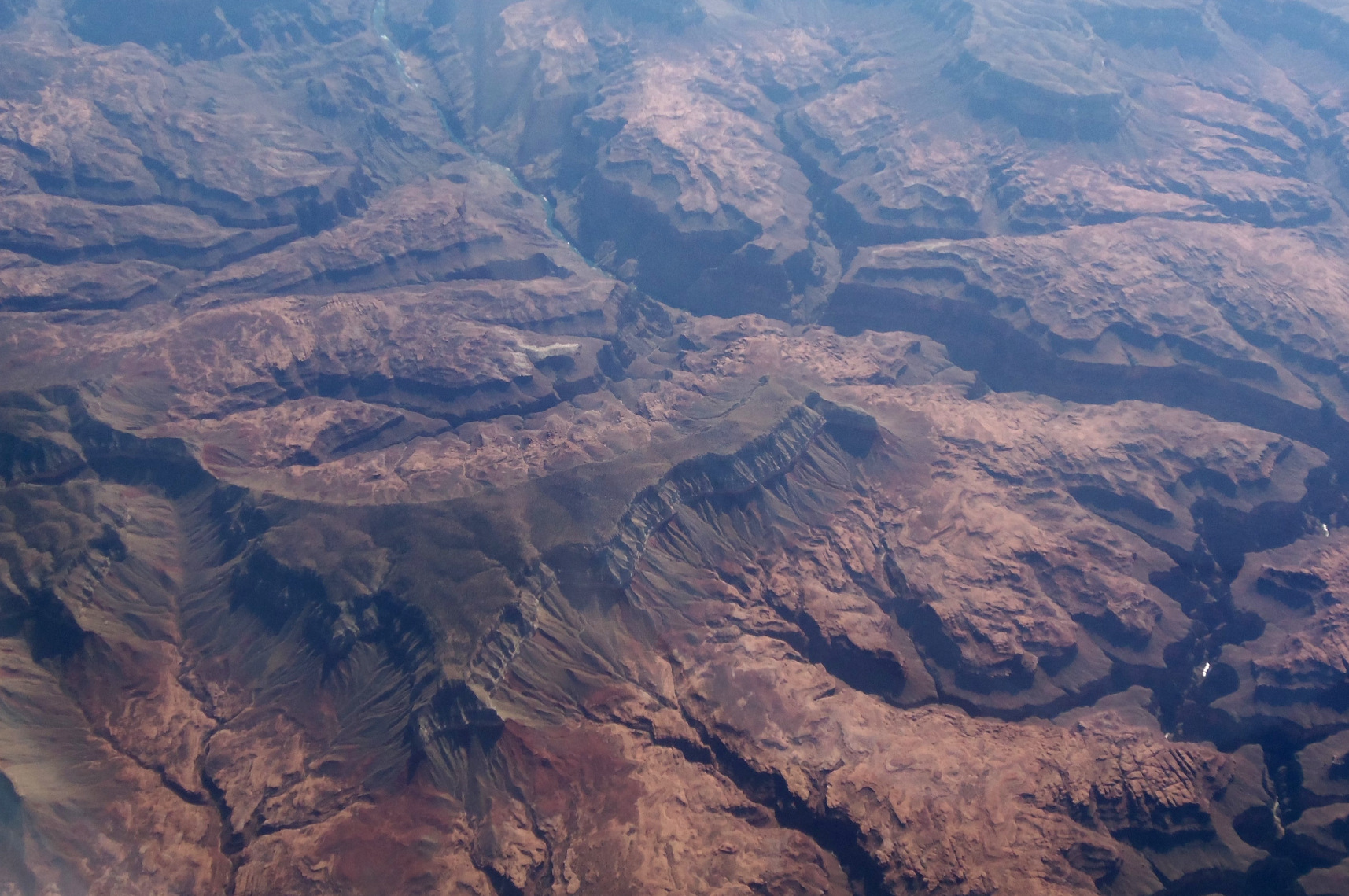
- Fishtail Mesa & Fishtail Canyon-(east)

- Location within Arizona
- Floor elevation: 5,971 ft (1,820 m)
- Length: ~3.0 miles south-southwest by north-northeast, (fishtailing southwest)
- Width: ~0.8 miles
- Area: 439 hectares (1.69 mi^{2})

Geology
- Age: Permian down to Cambrian: Kaibab Limestone, Toroweap Formation, Coconino Sandstone, Hermit Shale, Supai Group, Redwall Limestone, Tonto Group-(3 units); 3_Muav Limestone, 2_Bright Angel Shale, 1_Tapeats Sandstone

Geography
- Location: (west)-Grand Canyon, (northern)-Arizona, United States
- Coordinates: 36°26′00″N 112°34′36″W
- Topo map: Fishtail Mesa, USGS
- Rivers: Fishtail Creek (Canyon); Kanab Creek
- Interactive map of Fishtail Mesa

Fishtail Mesa is a linear, narrow plateau, adjacent the west-flowing Colorado River in western Grand Canyon, in Coconino County, Northern Arizona, about 2.0 miles east of Kanab Point, and the outfall of south-flowing Kanab Creek, a major north tributary of the Colorado River, from southern Utah. Fishtail Mesa is part of the North Rim (west) and also lies 4.0 miles west of the outfall of Deer Creek, and Deer Creek Falls at the Colorado, a common stopover campsite for river rafters.

The linear and southwest direction of Fishtail Mesa, lies adjacent as the southwest border of Fishtail Canyon (and Creek); at the Colorado, the Fishtail Rapids occur as minor rapids of the Colorado River. Some other nearby prominences to Fishtail Mesa, are Paguekwash Point, about 5.0 miles southwest, and Mount Sinyella, 8.0 miles south-southwest, and on the South Rim region of the Grand Canyon.

== Geology ==
Fishtail Mesa is a mostly horizontal platform of the cliff-former (and platform-former) Kaibab Limestone, and the Coconino Sandstone also a cliff-former; the rock unit between the two, is the mostly slope-forming Toroweap Formation. Notably, below the Coconino are the slopes of dark-burnt-red Hermit Formation (Hermit Shale), as thick as the Coconino Sandstone, but the obvious colorful slopes standout, as they sit on the Supai Group, and another cliff-former, Supai unit 4 of 4, the extremely hard Esplanade Sandstone. Along the southeast cliffs overlooking Fishtail Canyon, another shelf occurs for Supai unit 2, the Manakacha Formation. So each cliff unit is alternating with a slope former.

The Supai Group sits on the platform of the Redwall Limestone, (a cliff-former, with massive cliffs in East Grand Canyon). Below the Redwall, is a short cliff of Muav Limestone, (but also a platform-former), then the slope-former slopes of Bright Angel Shale.

== Fishtail Point ==
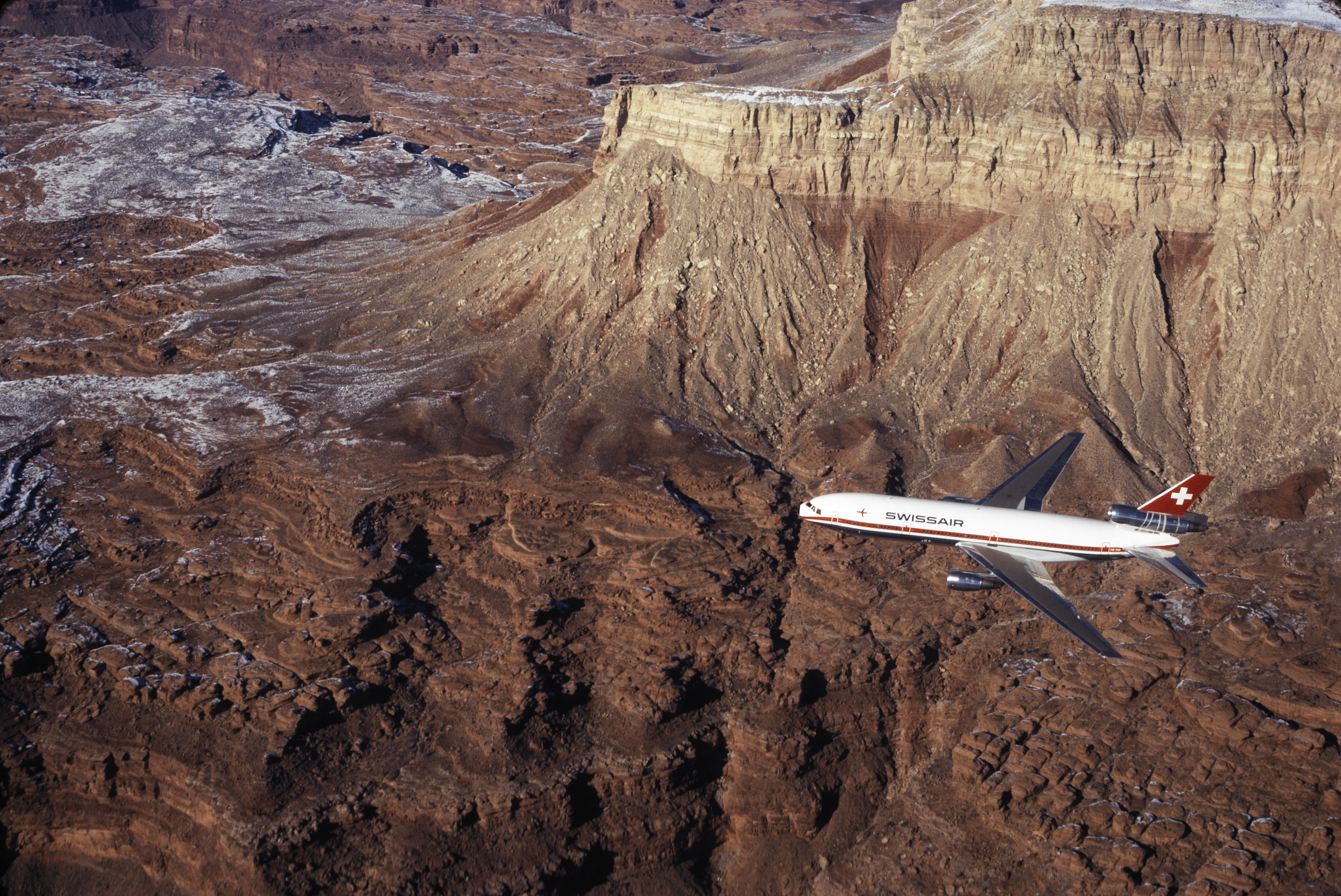

Fishtail Point is located at the southwest terminus of Fishtail Mesa. The point contains two platforms of white cliffs, with the lower Coconino Sandstone cliff, and platform, upon eroded slopes of the Hermit Formation. Most of the dark burnt-brick-red slopes of the Hermit Shale, are covered and obscured, by debris slopes of the Coconino Sandstone.

== Biology: Fishtail Mesa as a relict biological site ==
Fishtail Mesa, as a plateau unaffected by human visitation, and ranching or grazing influences, the plateau has been studied as a relict biological site (1958). In 1996 it was resurveyed to reveal changes in the plant species. The two tree communities are Pinus edulis (Pinõn Pine), and Juniperus osteosperma (Utah juniper); understory species are Artemisia tridentata, (sagebrush), and Poa fendleriana, mutton grass. Torrey joint-fir, Prickly Pear, and Snakeweed also occur.
