= Coat of arms of Sonora =

Mexican state symbol

Seal of the Free and Sovereign State of Sonora
- Armiger: State of Sonora
- Adopted: 1944

The coat of arms of the Mexican state of Sonora, has a shield with a blue outline and a golden inscription on the bottom part which reads "Estado de Sonora" ("State of Sonora"). The internal section of the shield of Sonora is divided in two:

== Symbolism ==
- The upper section divided in three triangular sections, them having the colors of the Flag of Mexico (green, white and red). The left triangle represents a mountain crossed with a pick and shovel, which symbolizes mining and that has a green field. The central triangle, with a white field, represents a dancer performing the deer dance, which is the traditional dance of the autonomous native tribe, the Yaqui, being the most important one in the northwestern Mexican state. The last right triangle with a red field that has three sheaves and a sickle as a symbol of Sonoran agriculture.
- The lower section in two equal squares. The left one on a golden field, is represented by the head of a bull symbolizing the state's ranching. The one in the right has an outline of the Sonoran coast in which Tiburón Island is seen over the shape of a shark which symbolizes the state's fishing.

== History ==
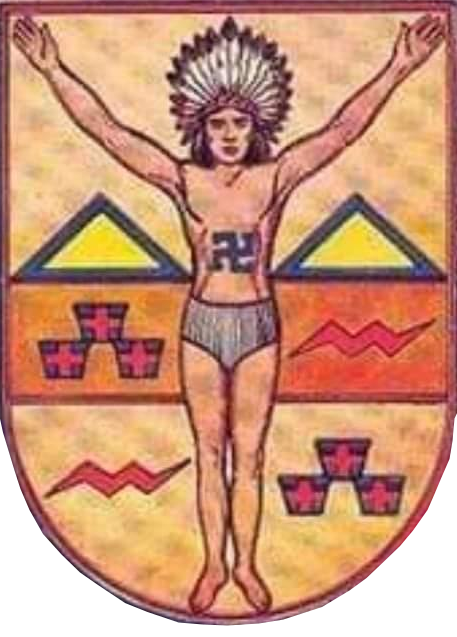
Coat of arms of the Sonora State (1922-1944)

The coat of arms was designed by architect Gustavo Aguilar and artist Francisco Castillo Blanco, who were given the task by the Governor of Sonora, Abelardo L. Rodríguez. It was officially adopted in December 1944.

== See also ==
- Sonora
- Coat of arms of Mexico
