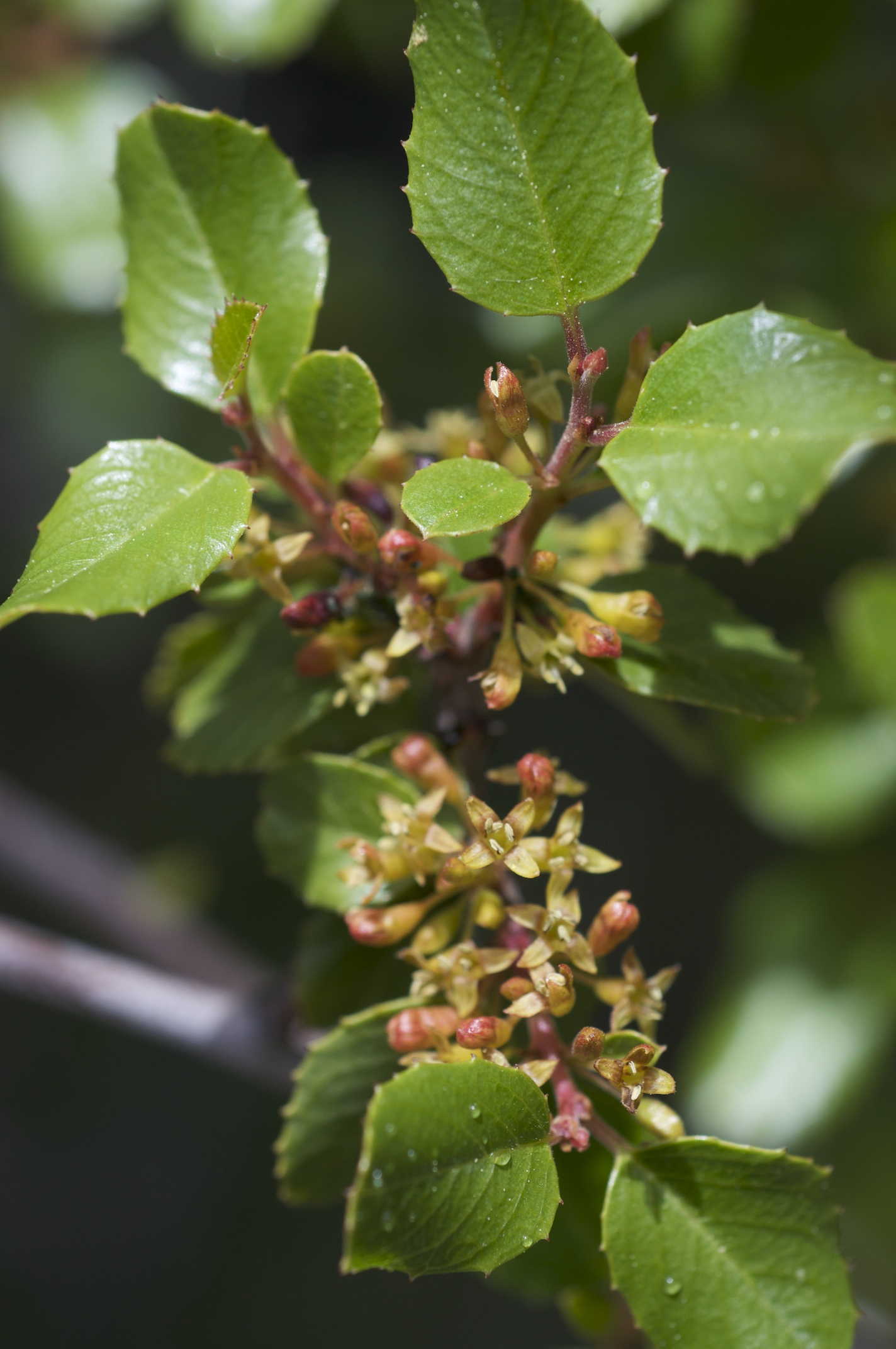

Conservation status
- Least Concern (IUCN 3.1)

Scientific classification
- Kingdom: Plantae
- Clade: Tracheophytes
- Clade: Angiosperms
- Clade: Eudicots
- Clade: Rosids
- Order: Rosales
- Family: Rhamnaceae
- Genus: Rhamnus
- Species: R. crocea
- Subspecies: R. c. subsp. ilicifolia

Trinomial name
- Rhamnus crocea subsp. ilicifolia (Kellogg) C.B.Wolf

Synonyms
- Endotropis crocea subsp. ilicifolia (Kellogg) Hauenschild; Rhamnus crocea var. ilicifolia (Kellogg) Greene; Rhamnus ilicifolia Kellogg; Ventia crocea subsp. ilicifolia (Kellogg) Hauenschild

= Rhamnus crocea subsp. ilicifolia =

Species of plant

Rhamnus crocea subsp. ilicifolia, synonym Rhamnus ilicifolia, is a subspecies of flowering plant in the buckthorn family, known by the common name hollyleaf redberry. It is native to western North America, where it is a common plant growing in many types of habitat, including chaparral and wooded areas.

== Description ==
Rhamnus crocea subsp. ilicifolia is a perennial evergreen rambling shrub approaching 4 metres (13 ft) in maximum height. The plant has a specialized woody growth at the base called a lignotuber that supports adventitious buds for regeneration after fire. The bark is grey; branches generally ascend and twigs are smooth to finely hairy, the base is rounded and the tip is blunt.

The thick leaves are oval to rounded with rounded tips, measuring 2.5 to 4 centimetres (1 to 1 1/2 in) long. The edges are spiny-toothed and curve under, making the leaves concave.

The inflorescence is a solitary flower or umbel of up to six flowers and generally smooth. The flower is inconspicuous and has four pointed sepals and no petals; flowers are typically unisexual. The bloom period is from April through June.

The fruit is a drupe which ripens to bright shiny red. It is just under 1 cm wide and contains two seeds. Fruits ripen from late July until autumn depending on location.

== Taxonomy ==
It was first described as Rhamnus ilicifolia by Albert Kellogg in 1863, and reduced to a subspecies of Rhamnus crocea in 1938.

=== Etymology ===
Rhamnus: genus name that derives from the ancient Greek name for buckthorn.

ilicifolia: Latin epithet that means "ilex (holly) leaved."

== Distribution and habitat ==
Hollyleaf redberry is found in the western United States, distributed in California, southern Oregon, southern Nevada and Arizona. It is found in elevations below 2,400 m (8,000 ft).

It grows in a diverse range of habitats including canyon slopes and bottoms, open hillsides, roadsides, rock faces, sandstone ridges, serpentine slopes and stream benches. It inhabits plant communities like the chaparral, chaparral-desert transition, coastal sage scrub, desert scrub, foothill woodland, meadows, montane forest plant communities, riparian areas and woodlands. in southern California, it provides significant cover in coastal sage scrub, in mid-elevation xeric and mesic chaparral, and, at higher elevations between 1,100 and 1,800 m (3,500 and 6,000 ft), in montane chaparral. It is adapted to grow in a variety of soil types including alkaline, sand, clay and serpentine soils. It can tolerate shade and does well as an understory plant in lightly wooded areas. It can be found in areas with precipitation between 300 and 2,010 millimetres (12 and 79 in), and once established, the plants are very drought tolerant and can even tolerate occasional flooding.

== Ecology ==
The evergreen leaves provide cover for birds and small mammals and the berries which ripen in late summer and fall are also consumed by wildlife. The flowers are visited by pollinators, including moths and butterflies.

== Uses ==
Human uses include erosion control where it is grown on dry and rocky hillsides as well as bank stabilization. It is also available as an ornamental plant, grown for its red berries more than its inconspicuous flowers; It is drought tolerant and easy to maintain. The berries are reportedly edible.

Various indigenous groups of California used the plant. The Nüwa of the Tehachapi Mountains region of Southern California had used the decoctions of the bark and roots as medicine for coughs and colds and as a laxative. The Ukomno'om of the North Coast of California also reported the use of the inner bark as "good medicine". The Wintun, also of Northern California, reported using the wood for torches because of its density and long burn time.
