= Mount Sinyella =

Landform in the Grand Canyon, Arizona

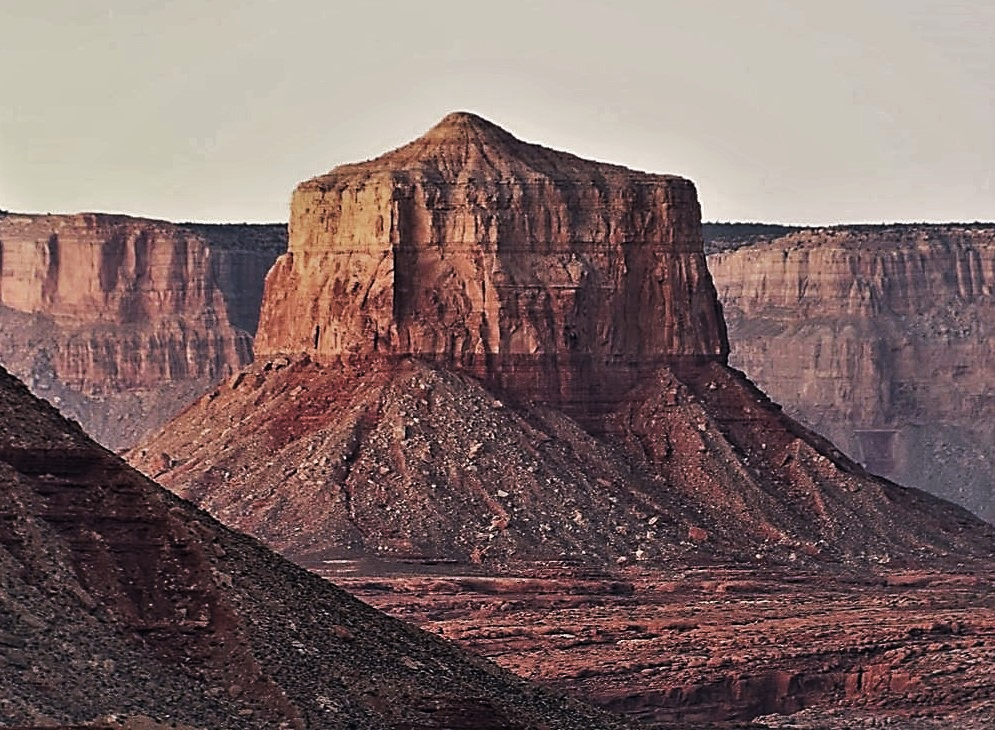
- West aspect

Highest point
- Elevation: 5,441 ft (1,658 m)
- Prominence: 1,193 ft (364 m)
- Isolation: 5.54 mi (8.92 km)
- Coordinates: 36°17′59″N 112°42′22″W

Geography
- Location within Arizona Location within the United States
- Country: United States
- State: Arizona
- County: Coconino
- Protected area: Grand Canyon National Park
- Parent range: Coconino Plateau; Colorado Plateau
- Topo map: USGS Havasu Falls

Geology
- Rock age: Permian
- Rock type(s): limestone, sandstone

Climbing
- First ascent: 1960
- Easiest route: class 5.1 climbing

Mount Sinyella is a 5,441-foot-elevation (1,658-meter) summit located in the western end of Grand Canyon National Park, in Coconino County of northern Arizona, in the Southwestern United States. It is situated 1.7 miles (2.7 km) north-northwest of Uqualla Point, and four miles (6.4 km) southeast of Boysag Point, at the mouth of Havasu Canyon. As the high point of Sinyella Mesa, it towers 1,200 feet above the mesa, and 3,600 feet above the nearby Colorado River which is 1.5 mile to the northwest.

This isolated butte is an erosional remnant composed of Permian Kaibab Limestone and Coconino Sandstone. This sandstone, which is the third-youngest stratum in the Grand Canyon, was deposited 265 million years ago as sand dunes. According to the Köppen climate classification system, Mount Sinyella is located in a Cold semi-arid climate zone.

== History ==
This butte's name was adopted as Mount Sinyala in 1932 by the U.S. Board on Geographic Names. In 1988, the board officially revised it to the present spelling, Sinyella. It was named by the American conservationist Charles Sheldon for Judge Sinyella (1853–1923), a prominent Havasupai chief who Sheldon hired as a guide to show him the canyon in 1912. "It is interesting to go with him [Sinyala], he knows every foot of the country" noted Sheldon. The local native inhabitants called it "Week-eel-eela" which is said to mean "stick sitting up", also their general term for any butte.

The first ascent of the summit was made April 11, 1960, by Don Myers, Mike Sherrick, Jim Wilkerson, and Bill Amborn via the north face. The second ascent was made by Dave Ganci and Jerry Robertson, May 3, 1969.

== Gallery ==
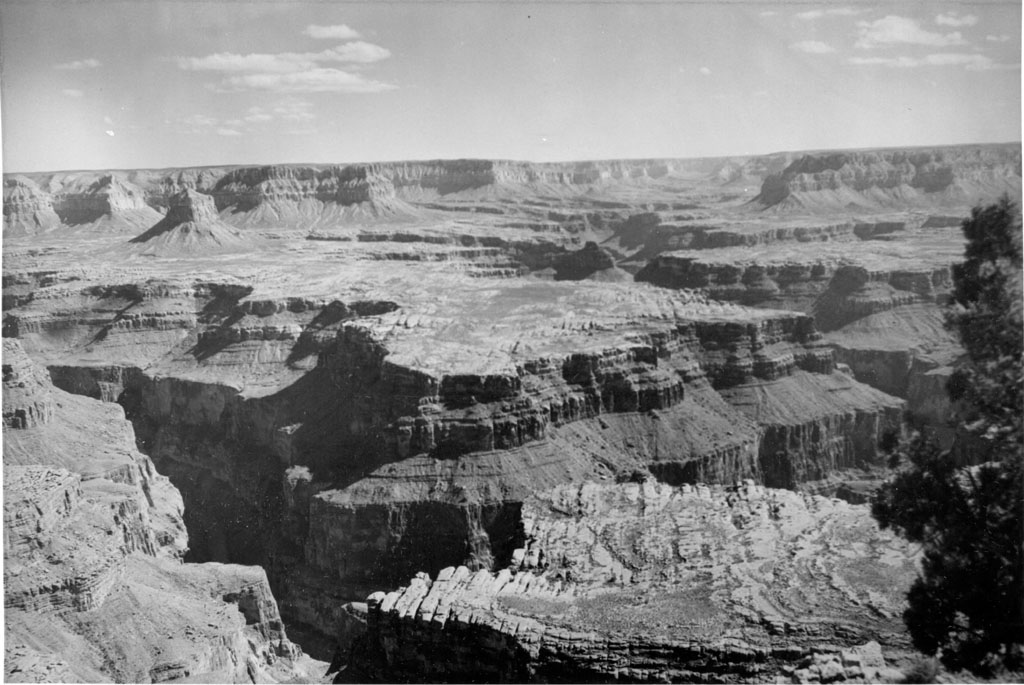
Sinyella Mesa from Boysag Point, with Mt. Sinyella upper left. circa 1951

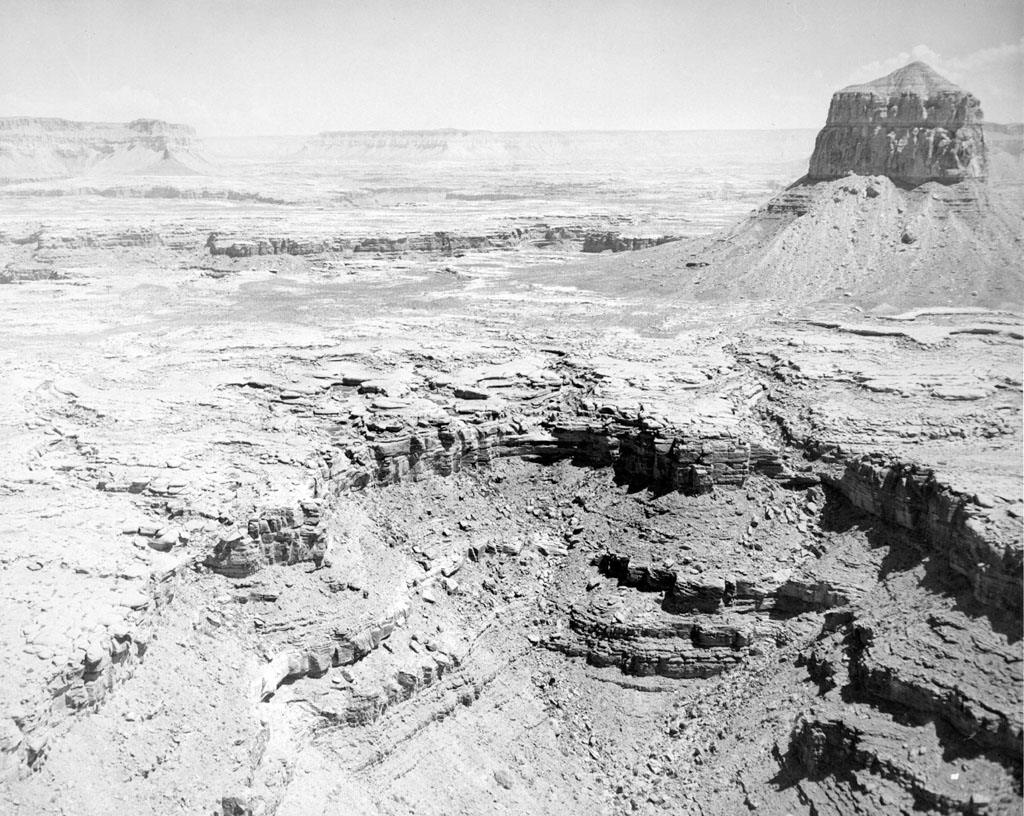
Southwest aspect, circa 1949

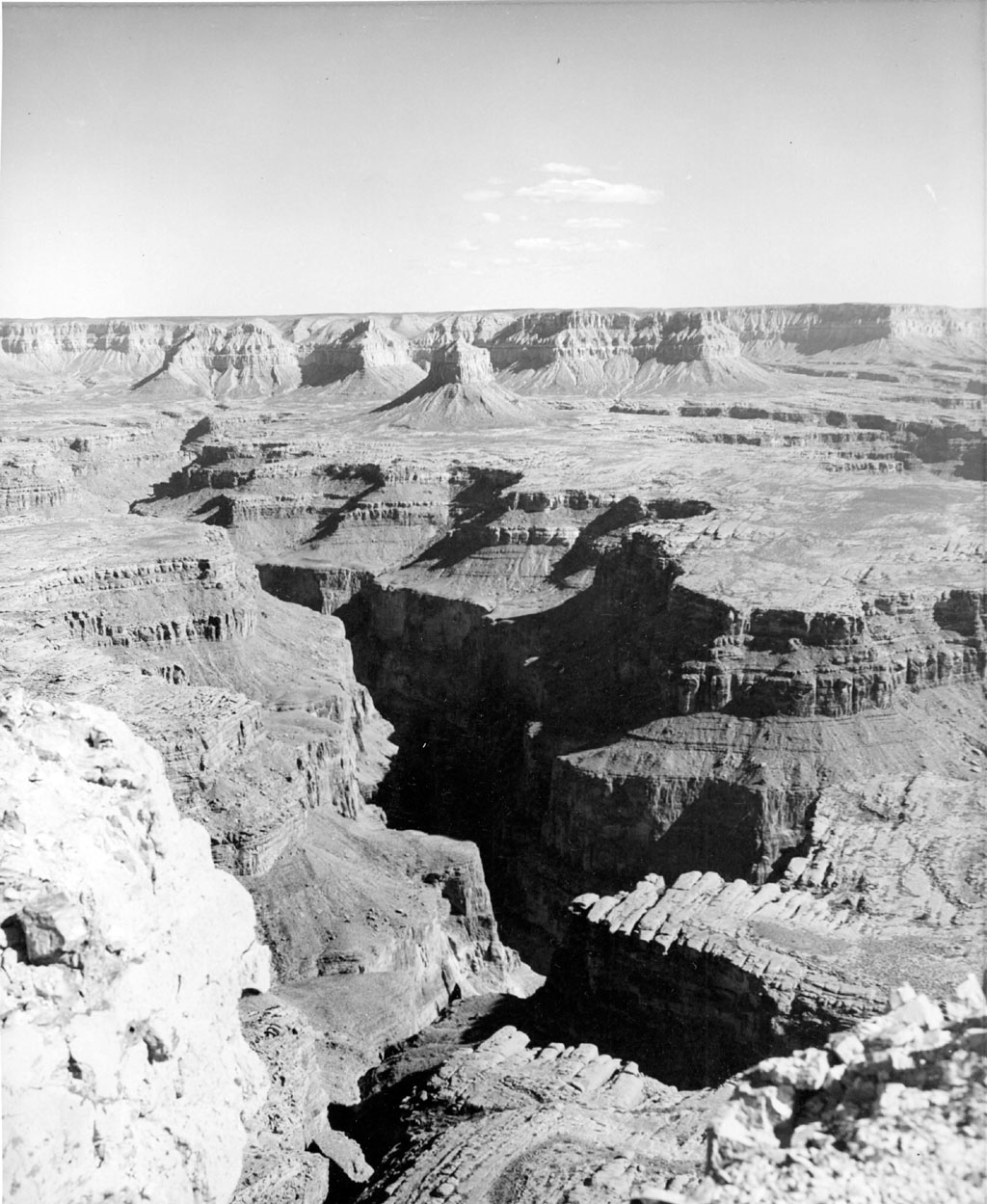
Mt. Sinyella centered, Sinyella Canyon to left

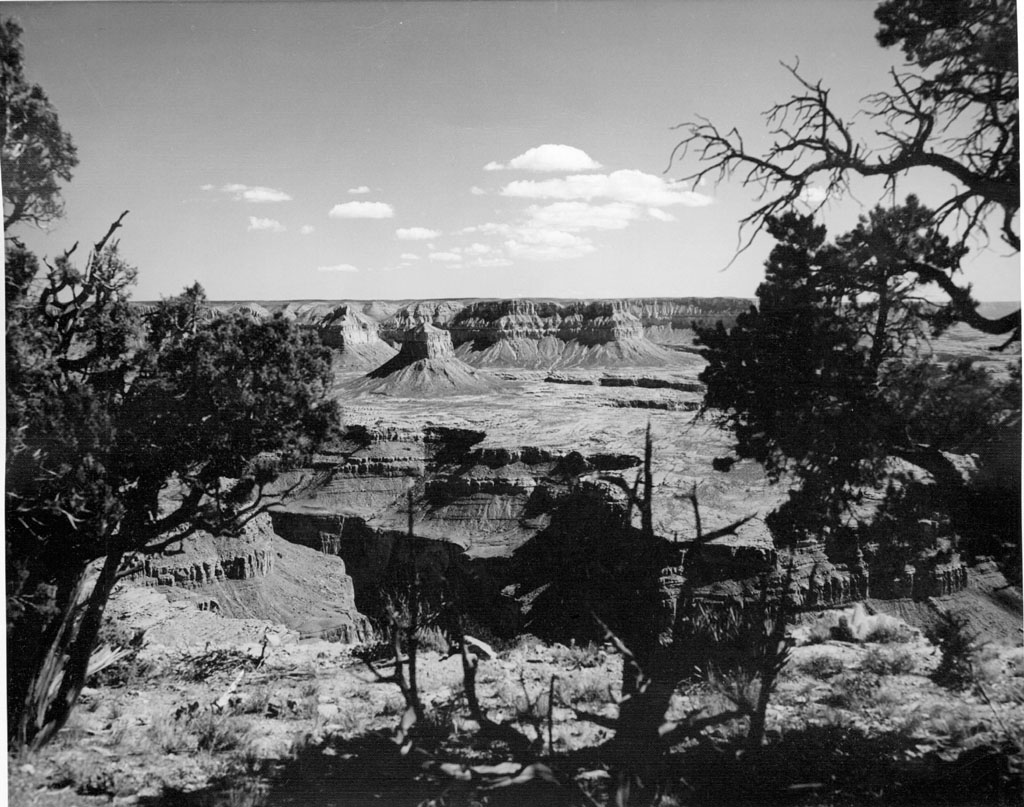
from Boysag Point, circa 1951

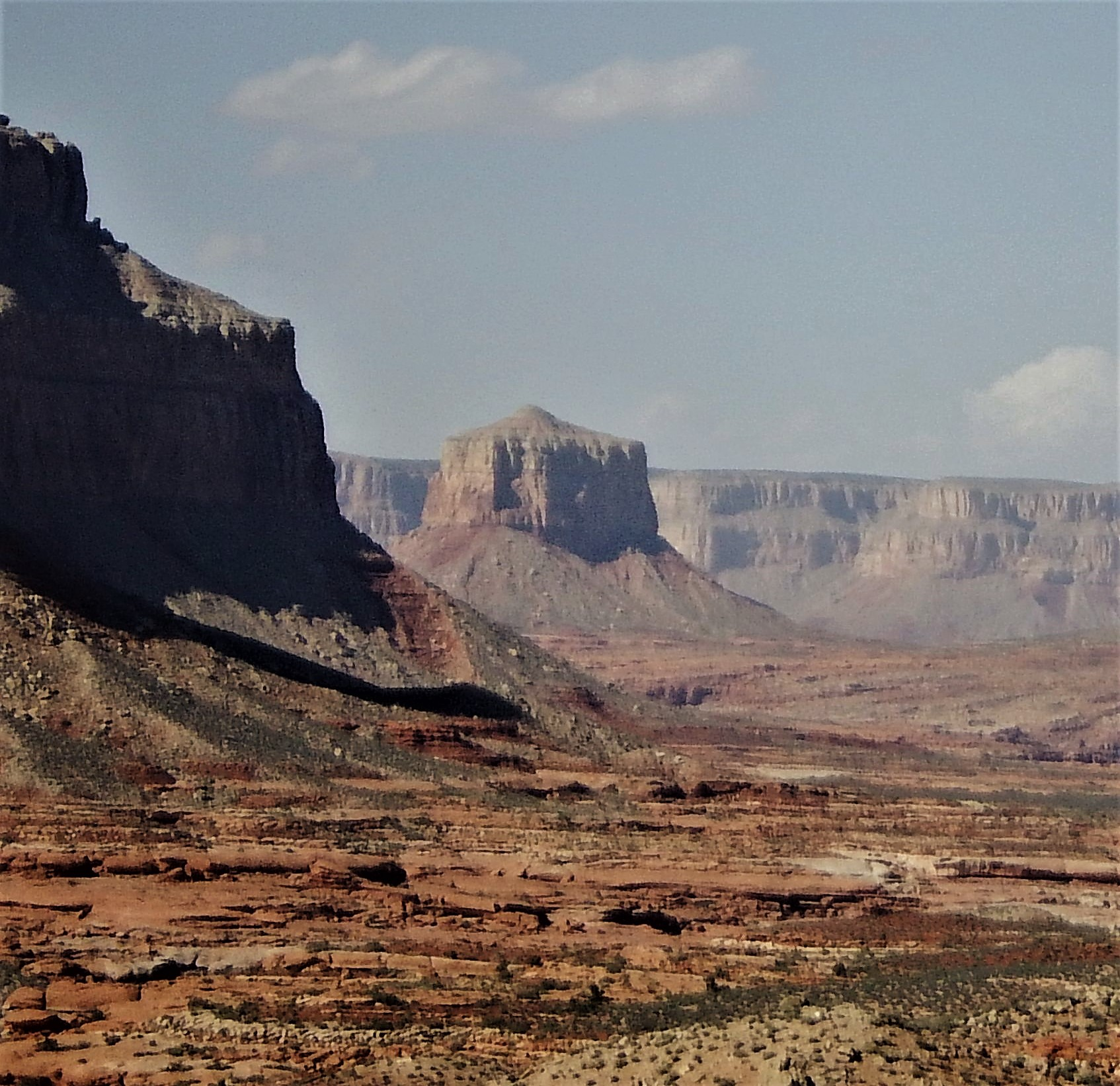

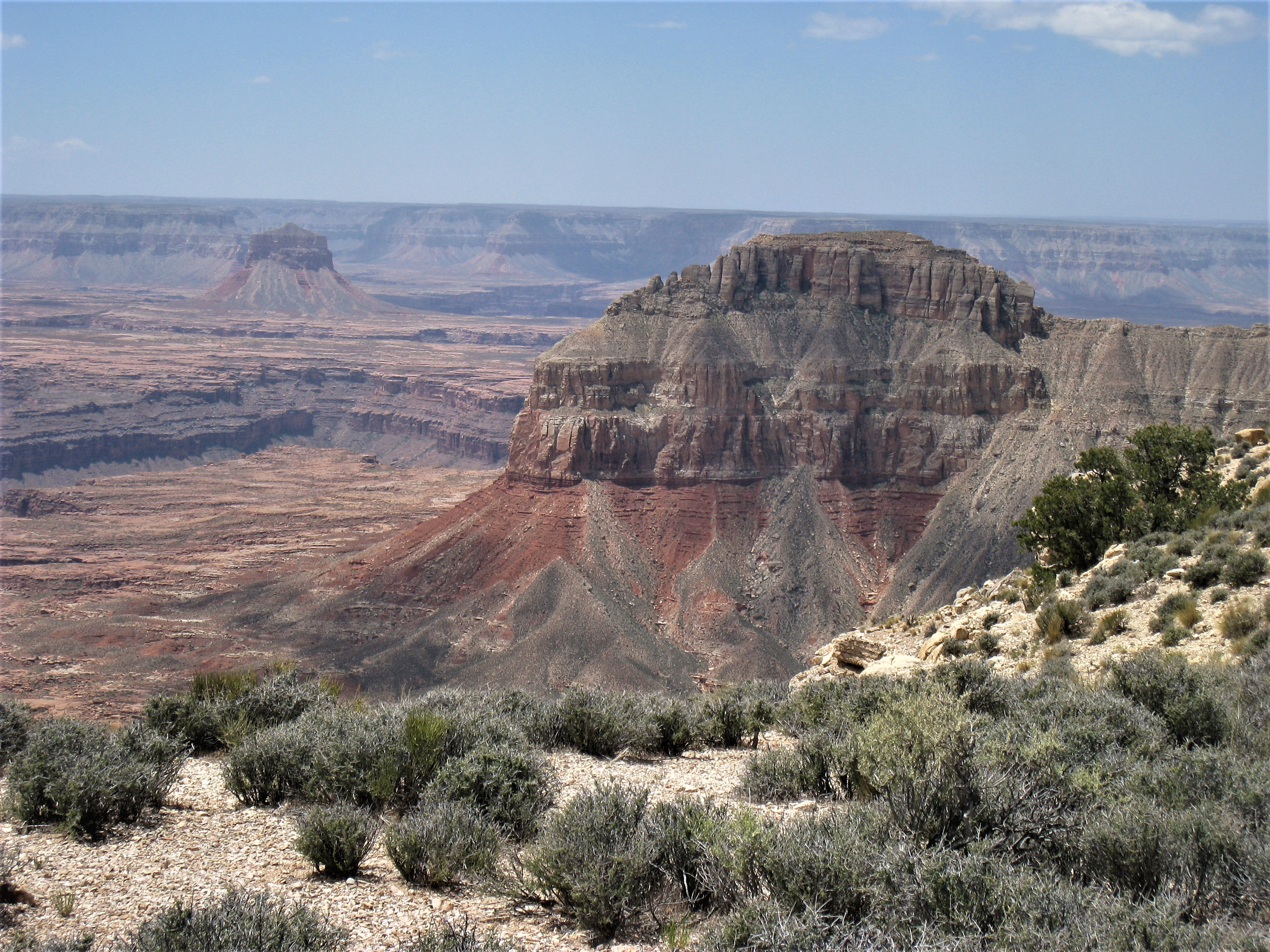
Mount Sinyella (left) and Paguekwash Point (right) from Kanab Point

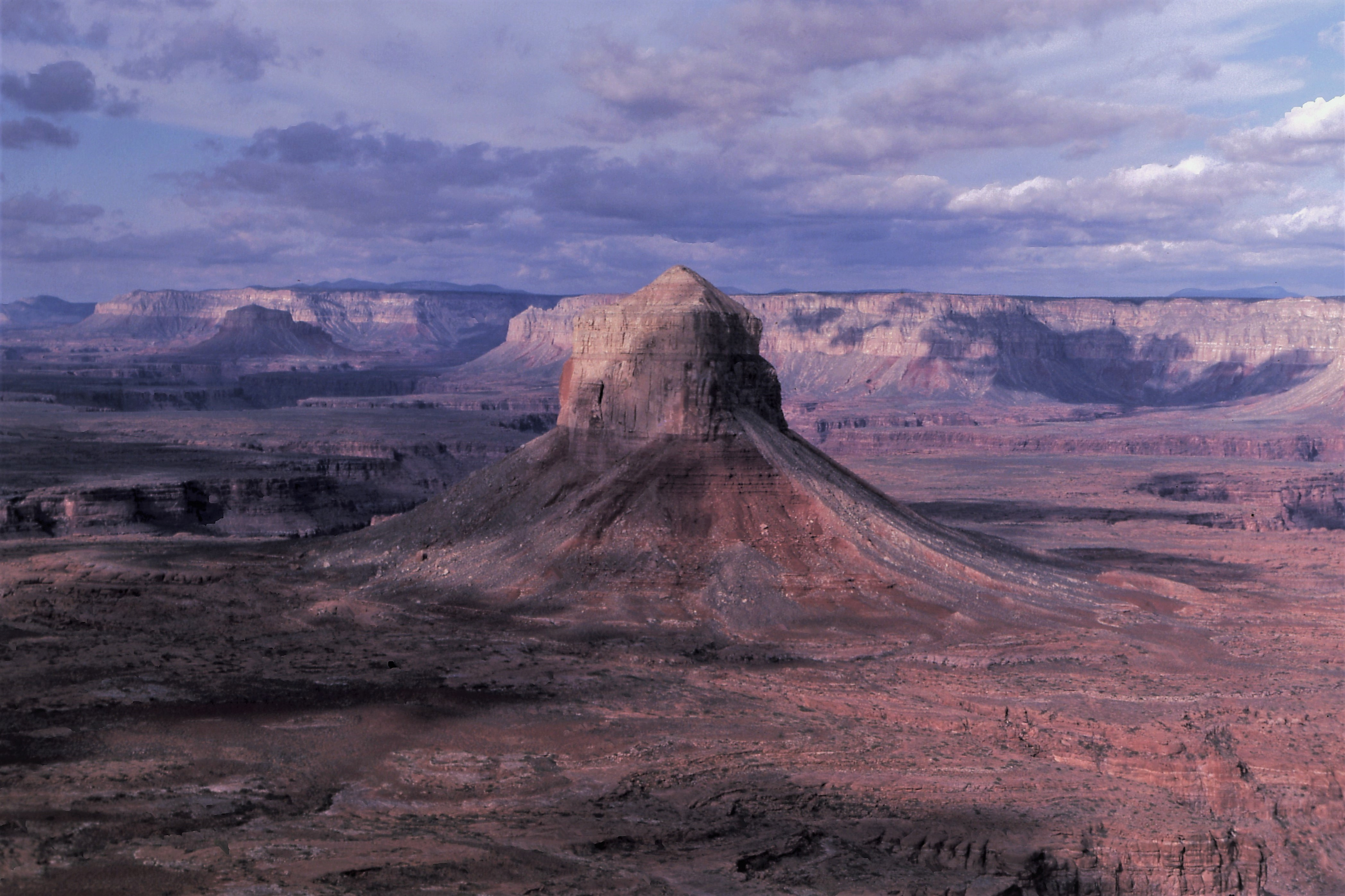
Mt. Sinyella, east aspect

== See also ==
- Geology of the Grand Canyon area
- History of the Grand Canyon area
- Paguekwash Point
- Fishtail Mesa
