= Tiburón Island mule deer =

Scientific classification
- Kingdom: Animalia
- Phylum: Chordata
- Class: Mammalia
- Order: Artiodactyla
- Family: Cervidae
- Subfamily: Capreolinae
- Genus: Odocoileus
- Species: O. hemionus
- Subspecies: O. h. sheldoni

Trinomial name
- Odocoileus hemionus sheldoni Goldman, 1939

Subspecies of mammal

The Tiburón Island mule deer (Odocoileus hemionus sheldoni) or Sheldon's mule deer, is a subspecies of the mule deer (Ococoileus hemionus) that is native to Tiburón Island, Sonora, Mexico.

== Anatomy ==
The Tiburón Island mule deer differs from mainland populations by its variation in color, size, and dental measurements. Other changes may or may not be evident on the subspecies.

== Distribution and habitat ==
The Tiburón Island mule deer is native to Tiburón Island, Sonora, Mexico, where it lives in entirely semi-arid to arid zones. Its range is within the Islas del Golfo de California Biosphere Reserve, which covers over 200 islands off the coast of western Mexico.

== Classification and conservation ==
The Tiburón Island mule deer is also called the "Tiburon Island mule deer" in most English speaking countries, for the acute accent is not needed. It is still undecided if the Tiburón Island mule deer is a valid subspecies or not, for it may be a synonym of either the burro mule deer (Odocoileus hemionus eremicus), or the peninsular mule deer (Odocoileus hemionus peninsulae).

The Tiburón Island mule deer is listed as "Vulnerable" by many sources, for its natural range is being threatened by feral dogs, coyotes, and poaching. The mule deer population on the island was at 869 in 1980, and 650 in 1993, showing its gradual decline over the years.
