= Rhamnus crocea subsp. pirifolia =

Scientific classification
- Kingdom: Plantae
- Clade: Tracheophytes
- Clade: Angiosperms
- Clade: Eudicots
- Clade: Rosids
- Order: Rosales
- Family: Rhamnaceae
- Genus: Rhamnus
- Species: R. crocea
- Subspecies: R. c. subsp. pirifolia

Trinomial name
- Rhamnus crocea subsp. pirifolia (Greene) C.B.Wolf

Synonyms
- Endotropis crocea subsp. pirifolia (Greene) Hauenschild; Rhamnus catalinae Davidson; Rhamnus crocea var. pirifolia (Greene) Little; Rhamnus pirifolia Greene; Ventia crocea subsp. pirifolia (Greene) Hauenschild

Species of tree

Rhamnus crocea subsp. pirifolia, synonym Rhamnus pirifolia, is a subspecies of tree and shrub in the buckthorn family known by the common name island redberry. It is an island endemic which is known only from the Channel Islands of California and Guadalupe Island off Baja California. Its habitat consists of coastal sage scrub and chaparral.

== Description ==
Rhamnus crocea subsp. pirifolia is a spreading shrublike tree which approaches 10 meters-30 feet in maximum height. It has gray bark on its branches and the young twigs are purple in color. The thick evergreen leaves are oval in shape with pointed or nearly rounded tips, measuring 2 to 4 centimeters long. The edges are smooth or toothed and curve under, making the leaves concave. The inflorescence is a solitary flower or umbel of up to six flowers. The flower has four pointed sepals and no petals. The fruit is a drupe which ripens to bright red. It is just under a centimeter wide and contains two seeds.

== See also ==
- California chaparral and woodlands - (ecoregion)
- California coastal sage and chaparral - (subecoregion)
