= Paguekwash Point =

Cliff in Mohave County, Arizona, US

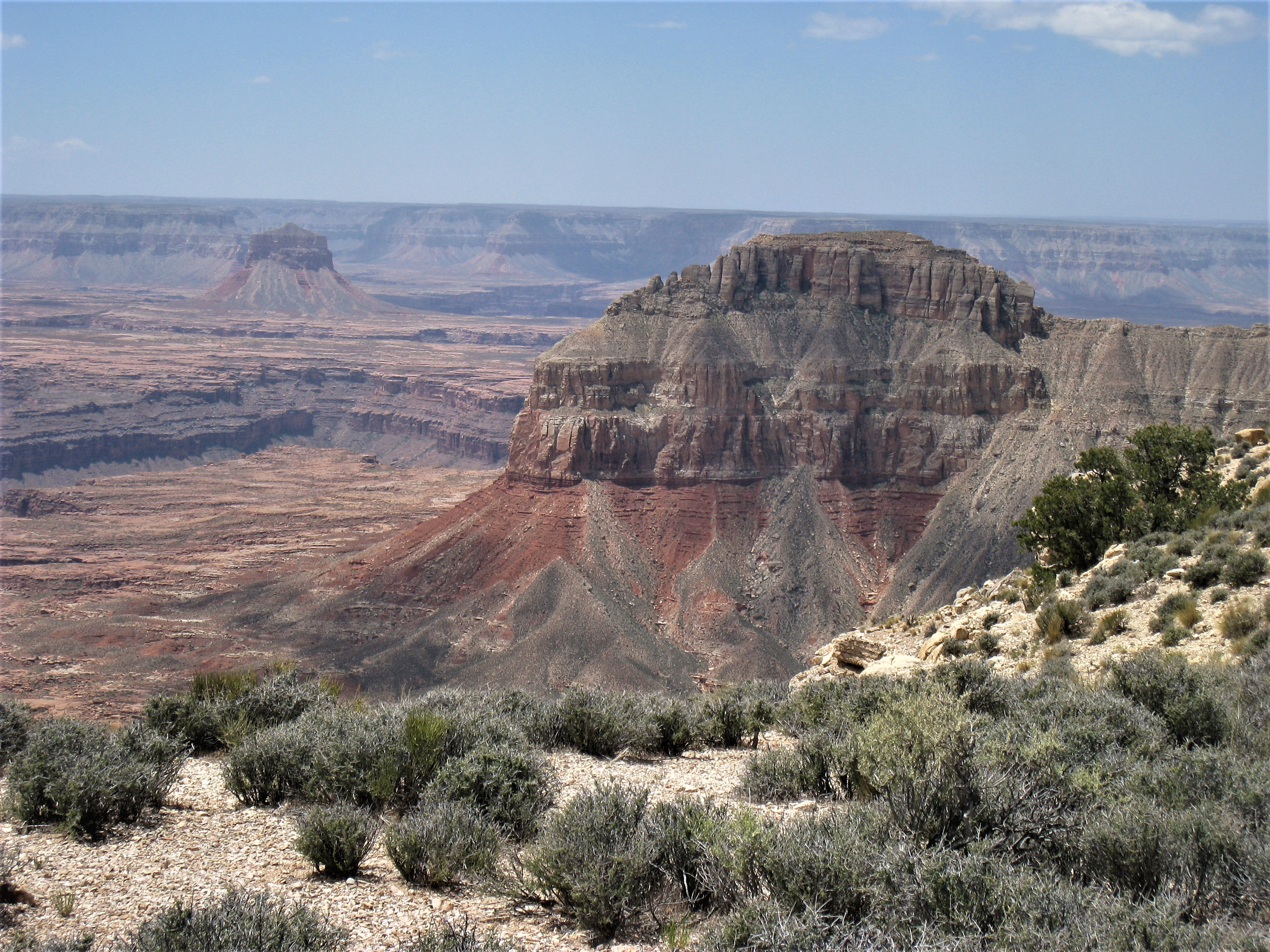
- Paguekwash Point

Highest point
- Elevation: 5,663 ft (1,726 m)
- Prominence: 323 ft (98 m)
- Parent peak: Fishtail Mesa
- Isolation: 7.96 mi (12.81 km)
- Coordinates: 36.3755°N 112.6735°W

Geography
- Location within Arizona Location within the United States
- Location: Grand Canyon National Park; Mohave County, Arizona, US
- Parent range: Coconino Plateau, Colorado Plateau
- Topo map: USGS Kanab Point

Geology
- Rock age: Lower Triassic down to Pennsylvanian
- Mountain type(s): sedimentary rock: limestone, sandstone, siltstone, mudstone, shale
- Rock type(s): Moenkopi Formation, Kaibab Limestone, Toroweap Formation, Coconino Sandstone, Hermit Shale

Paguekwash Point also known by these names, Fishtail Point, Paquequash Point, is a 5,663-foot (1,726 m)-elevation summit located in western Grand Canyon, in Mohave County of northern Arizona, United States.

In terms of Geographical location, Paguekwash Point is located at approximately latitude 36.37519 and longitude -112.67345, is a scenic point found within the Grand Canyon area in Arizona, USA. This area offers striking views of the Colorado River and the surrounding canyon landscape. Known for its rugged beauty and remote access, Paguekwash Point is popular among hikers and nature enthusiasts seeking a more secluded experience within the Grand Canyon's vast wilderness. It is located on the North Rim, about 4.5 miles northwest of Mount Sinyella and across the Colorado River. An excursion of the west-flowing Colorado is ~1.0 mile east, and also ~1.5 miles west. Kanab Point lies about 2.0 miles northwest. Paguekwash Point is in an arid section of the Grand Canyon, with the landform virtually devoid of vegetation.
