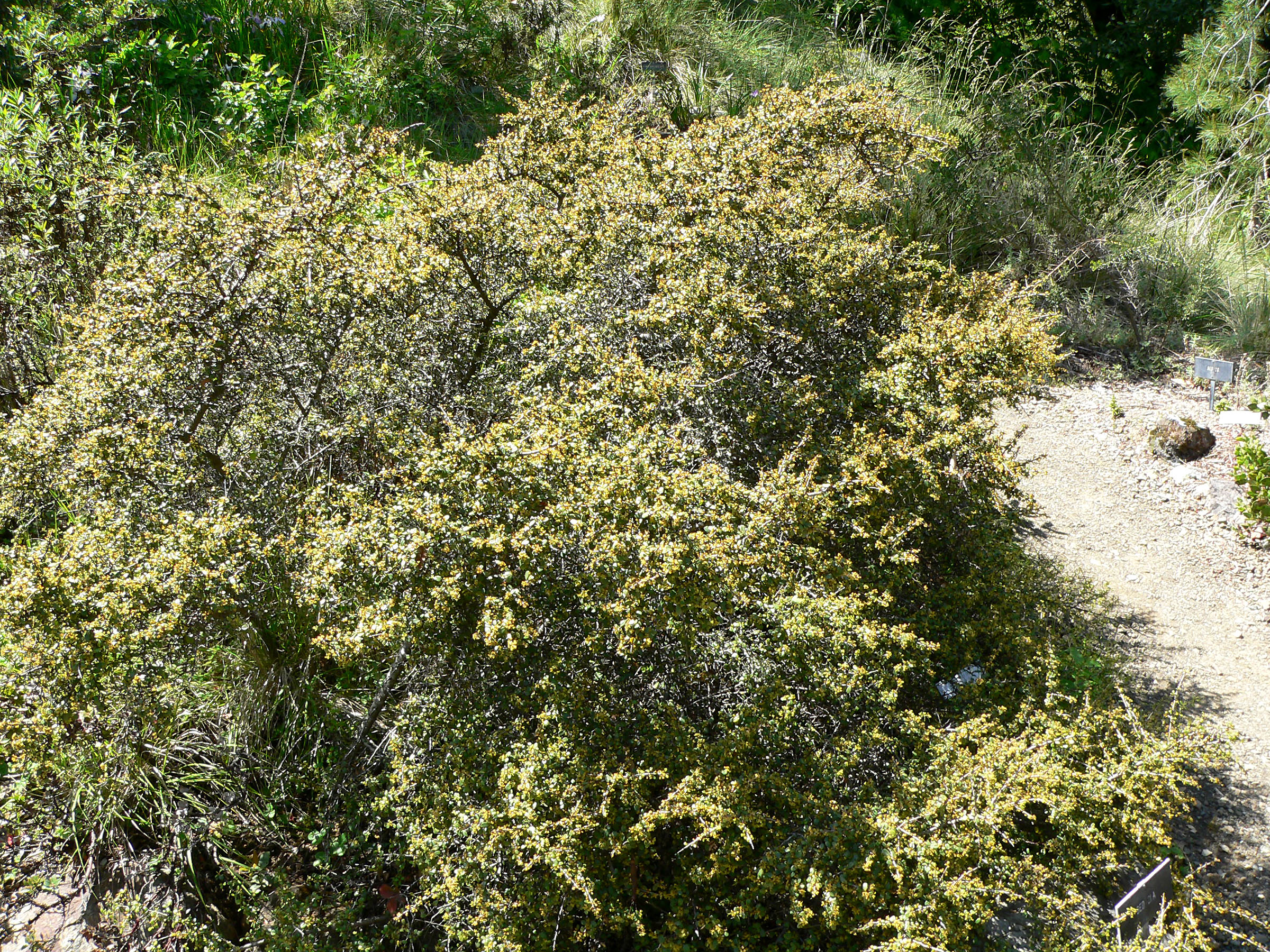

Conservation status
- Least Concern (IUCN 3.1)

Scientific classification
- Kingdom: Plantae
- Clade: Tracheophytes
- Clade: Angiosperms
- Clade: Eudicots
- Clade: Rosids
- Order: Rosales
- Family: Rhamnaceae
- Genus: Rhamnus
- Species: R. crocea

Binomial name
- Rhamnus crocea Nutt.

Synonyms
- Endotropis crocea (Nutt.) Hauenschild; Rhamnus crocea subsp. typica C.B.Wolf, not validly publ.; Ventia crocea (Nutt.) Hauenschild

= Rhamnus crocea =

Species of tree

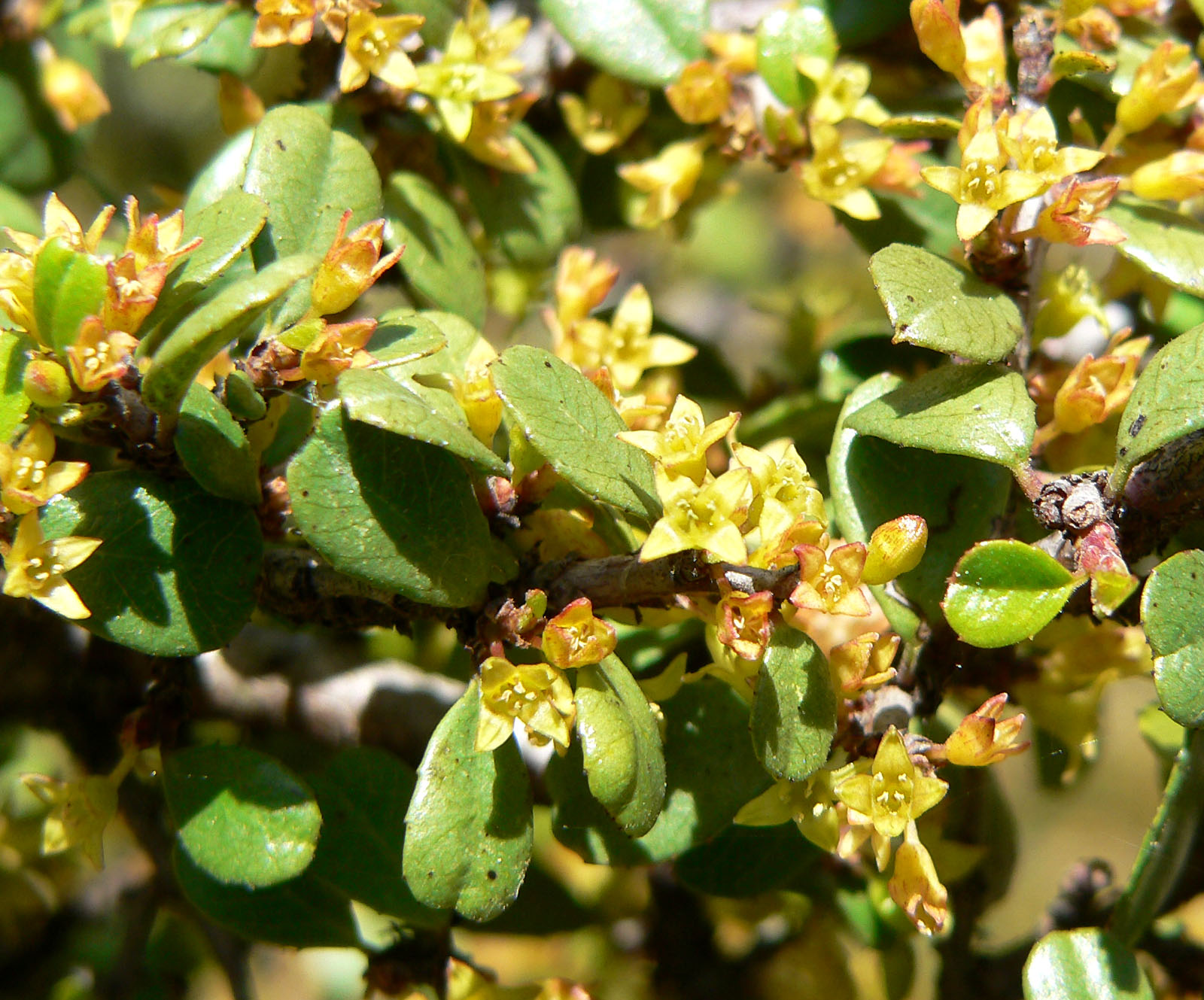
Rhamnus crocea flowers

Rhamnus crocea, the spiny redberry, is a species of plant in the family Rhamnaceae. It is native from California to northern Mexico. As of March 2024, five subspecies are recognized.

== Description ==
This evergreen shrub is typically 1–2 metres (3 1/2–6 1/2 ft) in height. The leaves are 1.4 centimetres (1/2 in) long. The flowers have four yellow-green sepals and no petals. The fruit is a red berry containing two nutlets.

== Taxonomy ==
As of March 2024, Plants of the World Online accepted five subspecies:

- Rhamnus crocea subsp. crocea
- Rhamnus crocea subsp. ilicifolia (Kellogg) C.B.Wolf, syn. Rhamnus ilicifolia
- Rhamnus crocea subsp. insula (Kellogg) C.B.Wolf, syn. Rhamnus insula Kellogg
- Rhamnus crocea subsp. pilosa (Trel. ex Curran) C.B.Wolf, syn. Rhamnus pilosa (Trel. ex Curran) Abrams
- Rhamnus crocea subsp. pirifolia (Greene) C.B.Wolf, syn. Rhamnus pirifolia Greene

== Distribution and habitat ==
Rhamnus crocea is native to Arizona, California, Nevada, and Oregon in the United States and to Northeastern and Northwestern Mexico and the Mexican Pacific Islands. It covers two major mountain foothills. In California, it surrounds the entire San Joaquin Valley, the pacific coast ranges and the western foothills of the Sierra Nevadas. In Arizona, it is found in the entire length of the Mogollon Rim to the western region of the White Mountains.

R. crocea typically occurs in chaparral, with common flora associates being toyon and hollyleaf cherry.

== Uses ==
The edible fruit was consumed by Native Americans in the Western United States. When eaten in large quantities, it reportedly imparts a red tint to the consumer's entire body.
