= Tiburón Island =

Island in the Gulf of California

Native name: Tahejöc
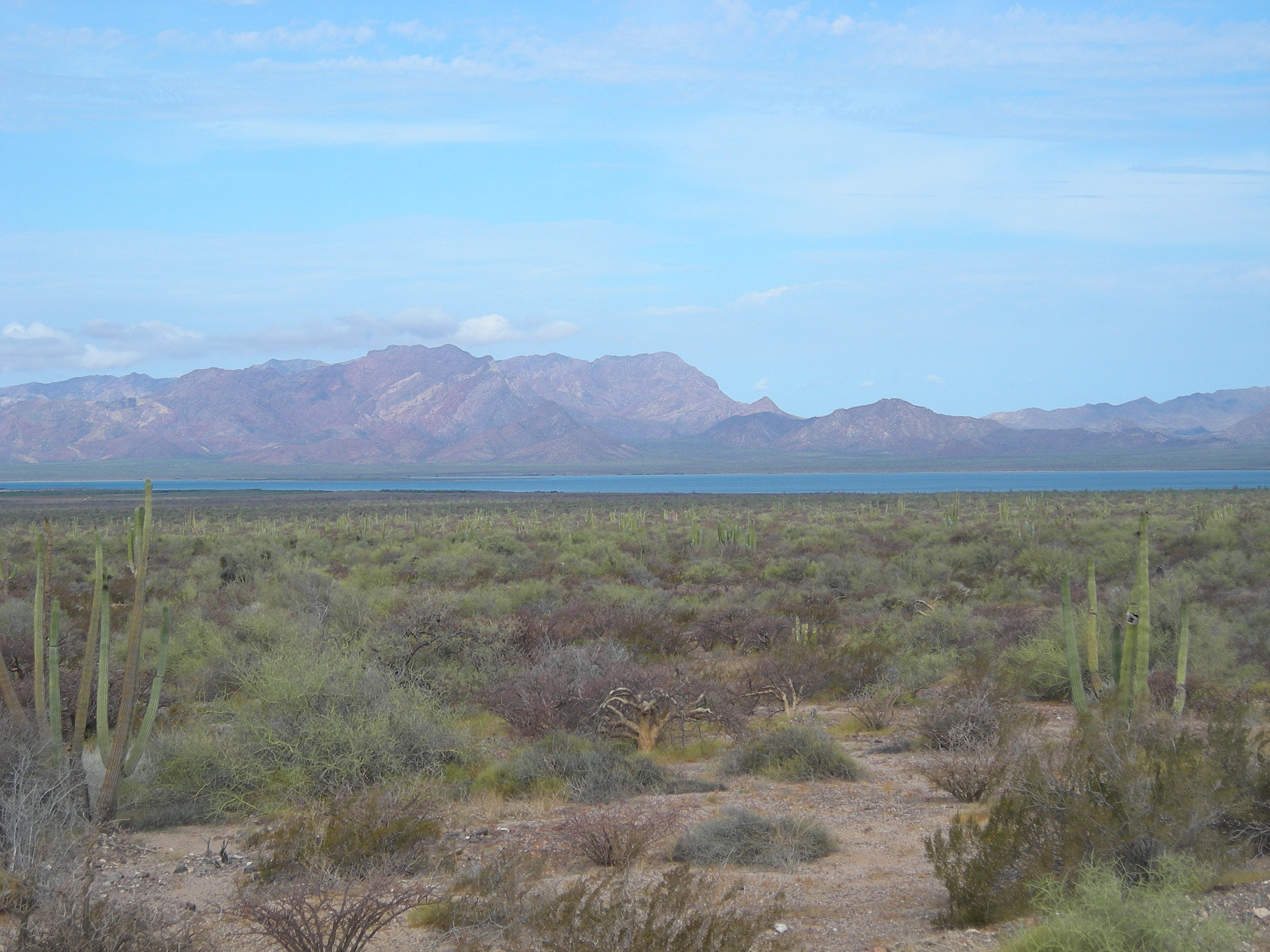
- View of Tiburón Island across Infiernillo Channel, south of Punta Chueca

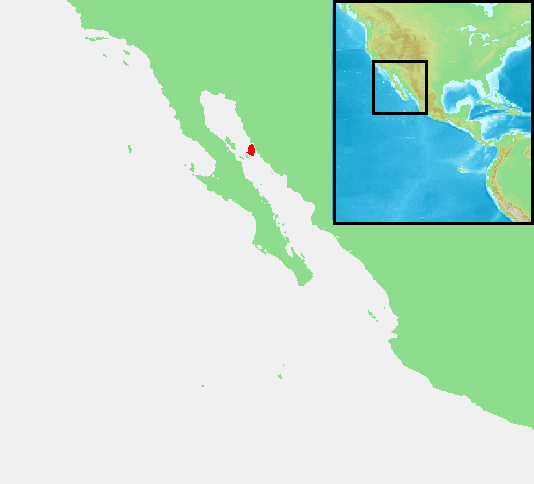

- Location within Sonora Location within Mexico
- Etymology: Spanish word meaning 'shark'

Geography
- Location: Gulf of California
- Coordinates: 28°59′20″N 112°22′23″W
- Archipelago: Islas Grandés
- Area: 1,201 km^{2} (464 sq mi)

Administration
- Mexico
- State: Sonora

Demographics
- Population: 0
- Languages: Seri (formerly)
- Ethnic groups: Seri (formerly)

Additional information
- Time zone: MST (UTC-7)

Tiburón Island (Spanish: Isla del Tiburón) is the largest island in the Gulf of California and the largest island in Mexico, with an area of 1,201 square kilometres (464 sq mi). It is uninhabited and it was made a nature reserve in 1963 by President Adolfo López Mateos.

== Etymology ==
Tiburón is Spanish for 'shark'. Although the Seri name, Tahejöc, was first recorded by Alphonse Pinart in 1879, its etymology is unknown.

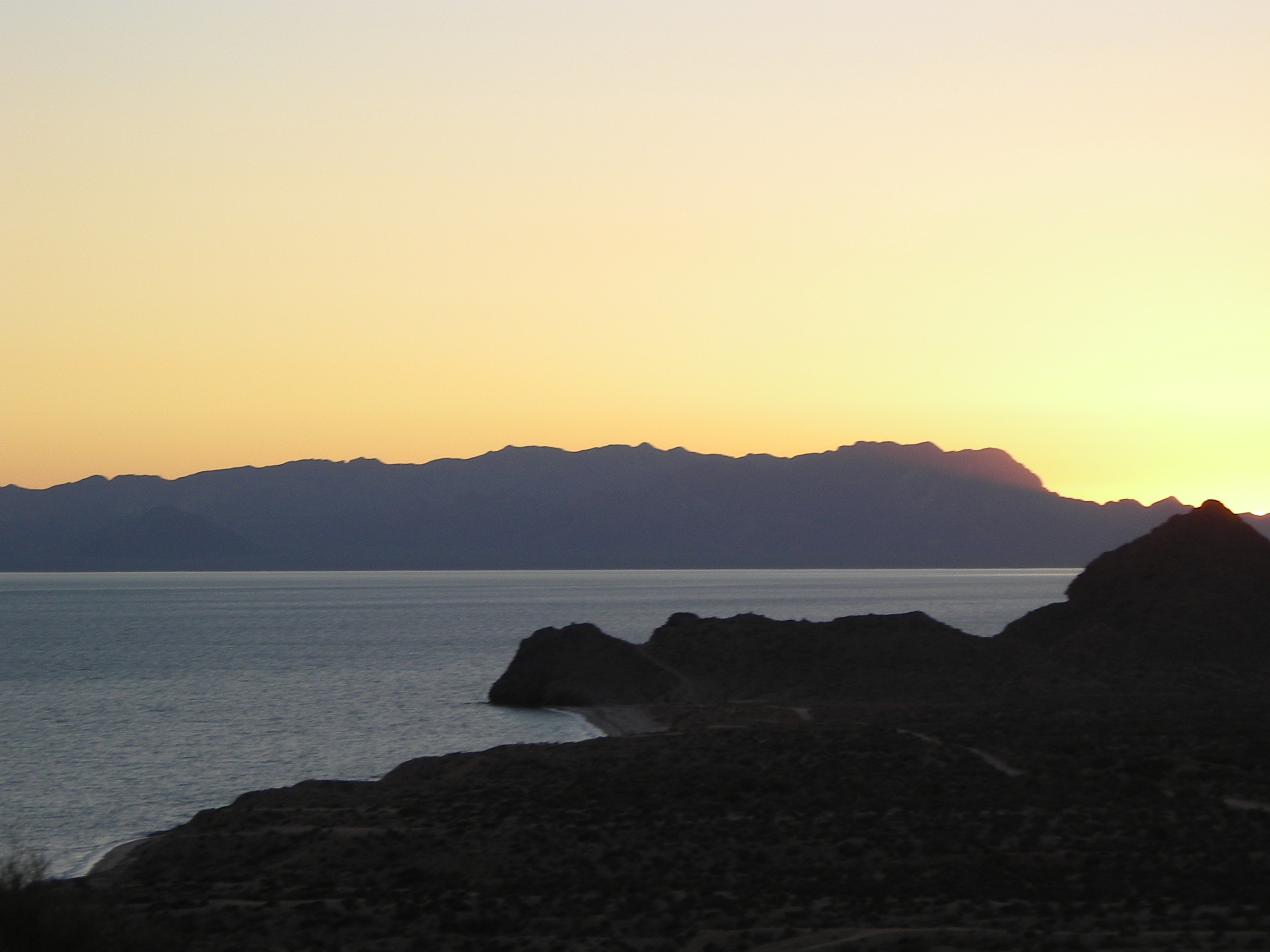
View of the southern part of Tiburón Island from Bahía de Kino

== Geography ==
Tiburón Island is part of the Mexican state of Sonora, as well as the Hermosillo Municipality, and is located at approximately the same latitude as the city of Hermosillo. It is located along the eastern shore of the Gulf of California, opposite Isla Ángel de la Guarda. It is part of the chain of islands known as the Midriff Islands or Islas Grandes.

The island has a prominent mountain system of volcanic origin.

== History ==
Tiburón Island is part of the traditional homeland of some bands (or clans) of the Seri people, for many centuries if not millennia. Author Charles Marion Tyler described the island in his 1885 book The Island World of the Pacific Ocean, saying that "little is known [of the island], a hostile tribe of Indians being in possession." Californian writer De Moss Bowers remarked in 1909 that Tiburón was "almost inaccessible" and that it had an "interior of which no white man has ever explored".

In 1905, three members of a U.S. gold expedition went missing, resulting in what is known as the Tiburón Island Tragedy. Although never confirmed by the sole survivor, it was suspected the Seri people were responsible for the disappearances, as it was not the first time an incident of this nature had occurred. American writer R.E.L. Robinson and explorer George Porter also went missing on the island in the 1890s, with it being theorized at the time that they were cannibalized by the natives. On 25 December 1906, one of the missing gold expeditioners' corpses was found, and it was confirmed that they had died from dehydration. The remains of the other missing gold expeditioner were never found.

During the 1960s and early 1970s, a small hunting and fishing camp on the northern end of the island was operated by Jesus Olivas, a resident of Hermosillo. He constructed several buildings, a dock and an airstrip near the historic Seri encampment at Tecomate. The camp was popular with American visitors to the area. The remains of the structures and airstrip are still in place (although the airstrip was rendered unusable by the Mexican military around 1995 in an attempt to keep it from being used by smugglers active in the area at the time). The Mexican government, through a decree by President Echeverría, gave the Seri "recognition and title of communal property" (reconocimiento y titulación de terrenos comunales) with respect to Tiburón Island in 1975.

The island is currently uninhabited (except for Mexican military encampments on the eastern and southern shores of the island) and is administered as an ecological preserve by the Seri tribal government in conjunction with the federal government. Bighorn sheep were introduced to the island in the 1980s; hunting is managed by the tribal government in coordination with Mexican federal authorities. It is also home to a unique subspecies of coyote (Canis latrans jamesi) and mule deer (Odocoileus hemionus sheldoni) that are endemic to the island.

== Transportation ==
The island can be reached from Punta Chueca, which is the nearest community inhabited by members of the Seri tribe, and from Bahía de Kino, a non-Seri community 34 kilometres (21 miles) to the south. The distance from Punta Chueca to Punta Tormenta, the nearest point on the island, is three kilometres (1 1/2 nautical miles). The channel between the mainland and the island is called Canal del Infiernillo ("Tiny Hell's Channel") because of the strong tidal currents and shoal water that occur there which can make navigation challenging.

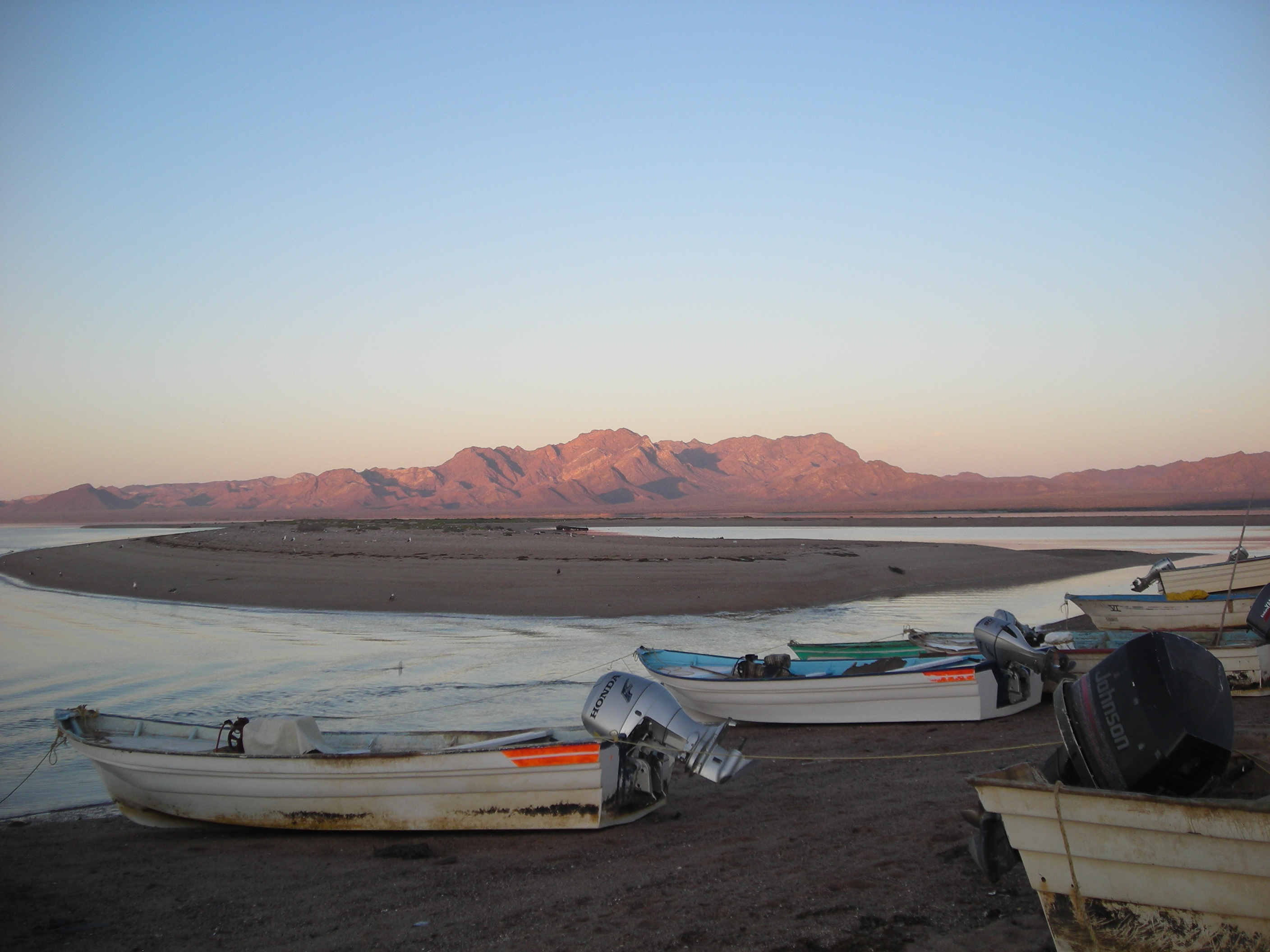
Early morning view of Hast Cacöla on Tiburón Island from Socaaix (Punta Chueca)

== Recreation ==
Two permits are required for day hiking and overnight stays on the island: one from the Seri Governor's office in Punta Chueca and another from the ISLAS office in Bahía de Kino.

== In popular culture ==
In 2012, two television episodes of Survivorman were filmed on Tiburón Island. It featured Canadian survivalist Les Stroud spending ten days living on the island. Mermaids of Tiburon is a 1962 film about a diver looking for buried treasure who comes across mermaids. Despite being set on the island, it was actually filmed on Catalina Island, off California's Pacific coast.

== See also ==
- Tiburón Island Tragedy
