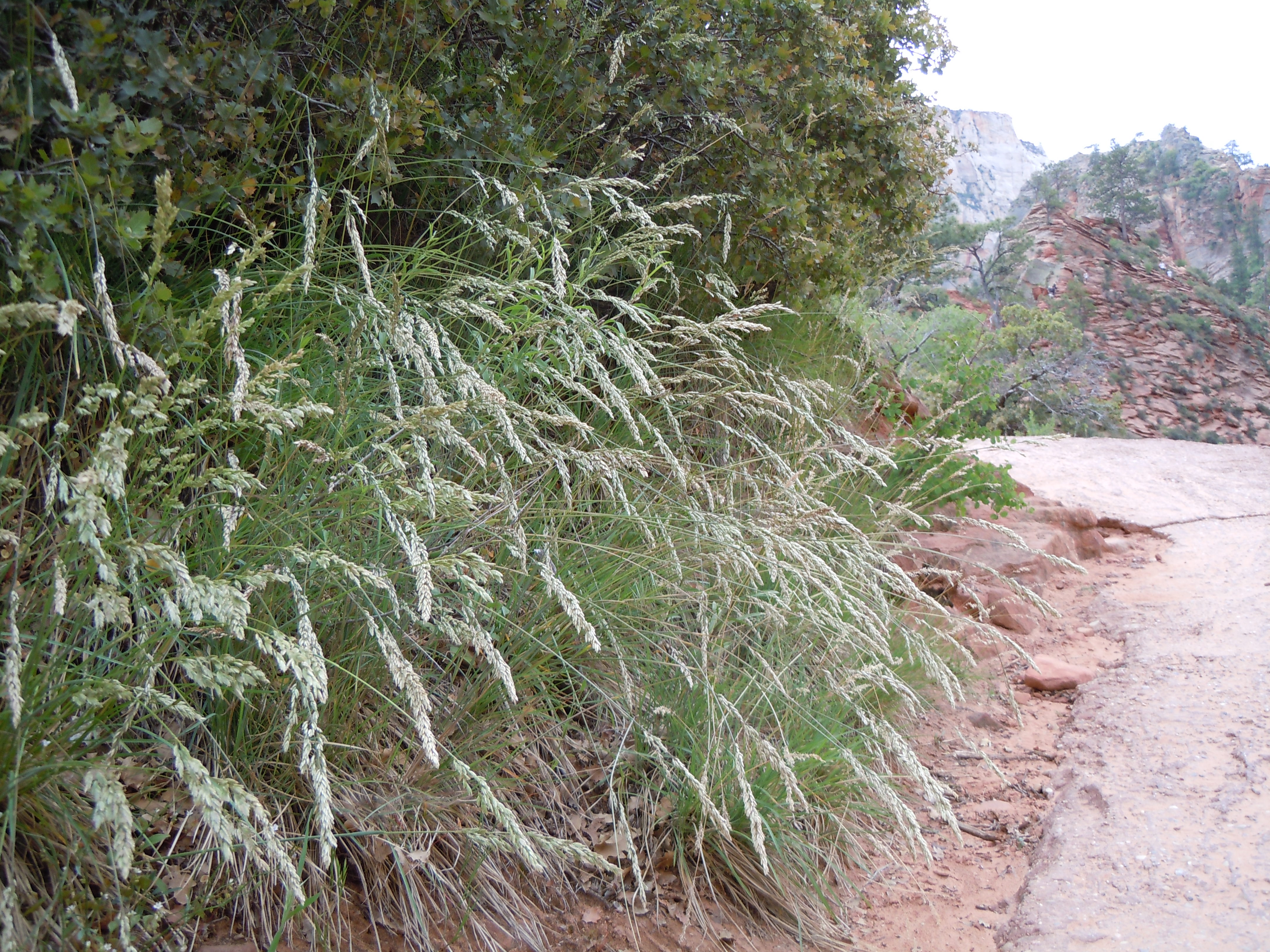

Conservation status
- Secure (NatureServe)

Scientific classification
- Kingdom: Plantae
- Clade: Tracheophytes
- Clade: Angiosperms
- Clade: Monocots
- Clade: Commelinids
- Order: Poales
- Family: Poaceae
- Subfamily: Pooideae
- Genus: Poa
- Species: P. fendleriana

Binomial name
- Poa fendleriana (Steud.) Vasey

Synonyms
- Atropis fendleriana (Steud.) Beal; Eragrostis fendleriana Steud.; Panicularia fendleriana (Steud.) Kuntze; Puccinellia fendleriana (Steud.) Ponert; Uralepis pooides Buckley

= Poa fendleriana =

Species of grass

Poa fendleriana is a species of grass known by the common name muttongrass. It is native to western North America, where its distribution extends from western Canada to northern Mexico.

== Description ==
This species is a perennial grass with small rhizomes. The stems grow up to 70 centimeters tall. The dead sheath bases remain on the plant for a long time. The narrow panicle has up to 8 erect branches crowded with spikelets. One inflorescence may have over 100 spikelets. The plant is dioecious, with male and female flowers on separate plants. Some populations lack male plants, while others are able to reproduce sexually. Asexual reproduction is more common than sexual, and most populations are all female. These produce seed without fertilization by pollen. The sexually reproducing populations are usually found in warmer climates with summer precipitation, while the all-female populations can tolerate colder climates and a wider range of elevations.

== Distribution ==
This is a common grass in western North America. It grows in many types of habitat, including sagebrush, oak woodlands, pinyon-juniper woodlands, desert grassland, and coniferous forest.

The grass often grows in dry areas, but it can occur in moist habitat, such as riversides. It can grow on many soil types. It occurs mainly on open sites or in partial shade; it does not tolerate the full shade of a closed canopy. It is a dominant plant species in several types of habitat.

== Uses ==
=== Forage ===
This grass is a "good to excellent forage for livestock" and wild animals, feeding cattle, horses, sheep, elk, deer, and pronghorn.

=== Erosion ===
The fibrous root system helps to control erosion of the soil. It is tolerant of drought and grazing.
