= Payment limitations (agriculture) =

In United States agricultural policy, the payment limitation refers to the maximum annual amount of farm program benefits a person can receive by law.

Persons are defined under payment limitation regulations, established by USDA, to be individuals, members of joint operations, or entities such as limited partnerships, corporations, associations, trusts, and estates that are actively engaged in farming.

The three entity rule allows payments for up to three farms (two of which are subsidized at half the normal level). Also, provisions exist to treat spouses separately as persons. For covered commodities, the 2002 farm bill (P.L. 107-171, Sec. 1603) sets limits at $40,000 per person per fiscal year on fixed, decoupled direct payments, and $65,000 per person per year on counter-cyclical payments. Separately, peanuts have the same limits.

The limit on marketing assistance loan gains and loan deficiency payments for loan commodities is $75,000 per person per year (this limit applies separately to wool, mohair, honey and peanuts). Farmers are not subject to any limits on the use of commodity certificates to repay marketing assistance loans. The Conservation Reserve Program has a limit of $50,000 per person per year, the Environmental Quality Incentive Program (EQIP) limits total payments to $450,000 to any participating producer, and the Conservation Security Program has annual payment limits for each of the three alternative levels of participation. Section 1604 of the Act imposes a prohibition on making commodity payments or conservation payments to individuals or entities that have 3-year average adjusted gross incomes exceeding $2.5 million (unless 75% or more of the income is from farming, ranching, or forestry).

== See also ==
- Commission on the Application of Payment Limitations for Agriculture
