= Honey program =

American honey producer price support program

The honey program is a price support program provided by the United States Department of Agriculture to American honey producers. Federal subsidies to the honey industry began in 1950, when demand for honey decreased following the end of World War II. The program was eliminated in 1993, and re-instated in 2002.

== History ==
In the United States, non-recourse marketing loans had long been available to support honey prices until FY1994, when the funding was suspended by provisions in annual appropriations legislation. During World War II, the United States government encouraged the production of honey, which was used as an alternative sweetener to sugar, which was strictly rationed. After the sugar rations were lifted and demand for honey fell, honey producers turned to the federal government for support. Subsidies for honey producers were included in the Agricultural Act of 1949.

In the 1980s, the Reagan administration and the United States Senate unsuccessfully moved to eliminate the program. A report by the General Accountability Office found that the subsidies to beekeepers were no longer necessary to ensure the pollination of American crops. President Bill Clinton proposed ending the honey program as part of his plan to reduce the national deficit. By 1991, over half of honey program subsidies went to fewer than 10% of participating beekeepers. The United States Congress ended the honey program in the 1993 agricultural appropriations bill.

The 1996 farm bill (P.L. 104-127) repealed the statutory authority for the honey program. A Honey Recourse Loan Program was made available for the 1998 crop only through broader emergency spending authority in the FY1999 agriculture appropriations act (P.L. 105-277).

In 2002, president George W. Bush signed an agricultural appropriations bill reinstating the honey program. The 2002 farm bill (P.L. 107-171, Sec. 1201) made honey eligible for marketing assistance loans (and loan deficiency payments, LDPs) from 2002 through 2007.
