= High moisture feed grains =

High moisture feed grains — In United States agricultural policy, corn and grain sorghum must have moisture content below Commodity Credit Corporation (CCC) standards in order to qualify for marketing assistance loans. Higher moisture feed grains do not serve as suitable collateral for nonrecourse loans. However, the 1996 farm bill (P.L. 104–127) first made, and the 2002 farm bill (P.L. 101–171, Sec. 1209) continued, the policy of making recourse loans available to producers of high moisture corn and grain sorghum.
