= Step 2 payments =

Cotton competitiveness provision in the U.S.

Step 2 payments are one of the three cotton competitiveness provisions intended to keep U.S. cotton competitive in domestic and export markets (initially authorized by the 1990 farm bill (P.L. 101-624)). Under the Step 2 provision, USDA is required to issue marketing certificates (or cash payments in lieu of certificates) to domestic users of upland cotton for documented purchases, and to exporters of upland cotton for documented sales, when certain U.S. cotton pricing benchmarks are exceeded. The payments provide a subsidy to U.S. cotton users and exporters so that U.S. rather than foreign cotton will be utilized, even when U.S. cotton is higher-priced. The 1996 farm bill (P.L. 104-127) and the 2002 farm bill (P.L. 107-171, Sec. 1208) continued the Step 2 provisions.
