= Marketing loan repayment provisions =

In United States agricultural policy, a marketing loan repayment provision is a loan settlement provision, first authorized by the Food Security Act of 1985 (P.L. 99-198), that allowed producers to repay nonrecourse loans at less than the announced loan rates whenever the world price or loan repayment rate for the commodity were less than the loan rate. Marketing loan provisions became mandatory for soybeans and other oilseeds, upland cotton, and rice and were permitted for wheat, corn, grain sorghum, barley, oats, and honey under amendments made by the 1990 farm bill (P.L. 101-624). The 1996 farm bill (P.L. 104-127) retained the marketing loan provisions for wheat, feed grains, rice, upland cotton, and oilseeds. The 2002 farm bill (P.L. CRS-161 101-171, Sec. 1201-1205) continued marketing assistance loans and expanded their application to wool, mohair, dry peas, lentils, and small chickpeas.
