= QSP =

QSP may refer to:

- Quality Samples Program, provides small samples of U.S. agricultural produce to foreign importers
- Quantitative systems pharmacology
- Quatro Scott Powell, a rock band composed of Suzi Quatro, Andy Scott and Don Powell
  - Quatro, Scott & Powell, the band's 2017 album
- Quick Start Programme, a fund administered by the United Nations Environment Programme
- Socialist Party of Kazakhstan (Қазақстанның социалистік партиясы; QSP), a former political party in Kazakhstan
