= Posted county price =

The Posted county price (PCP) is calculated for the so-called loan commodities (except for rice and cotton) for each county by the Farm Service Agency in the United States. The PCP reflects changes in prices in major terminal grain markets (of which there are 18 in the United States), corrected for the cost of transporting grain from the county to the terminal. It is utilized under the marketing loan repayment provisions and loan deficiency payment (LDP) provisions of the commodity programs. Rice and cotton use an adjusted world price as the proxy for local market prices.
