= Agriculture and Food Act of 1981 =

United States federal law

- Long title: An Act to provide price and income protection for farmers, assure consumers an abundance of food and fiber at reasonable prices, continue food assistance to low-income households, and for other purposes.
- Nicknames: 1981 U.S. Farm Bill; Agricultural Land Resources Policy Act
- Enacted by: the 97th United States Congress
- Effective: December 22, 1981

Citations
- Public law: 97–98
- Statutes at Large: 95 Stat. 1213

Legislative history
- Introduced in the Senate as S. 884 by Jesse Helms (R–NC) on April 7, 1981; Committee consideration by Agriculture, Nutrition and Forestry; Passed the Senate on September 18, 1981 (49–32); Passed the House of Representatives on October 22, 1981 (192–160); Reported by the joint conference committee on December 9, 1981; agreed to by the Senate on December 10, 1981 (68-31) and by the House of Representatives on December 16, 1981 (205–203); Signed into law by President Ronald Reagan on December 22, 1981

Major amendments
- Omnibus Budget Reconciliation Act of 1982

The Agriculture and Food Act of 1981 (Pub. L. 97–98, also known as the 1981 U.S. Farm Bill) was the 4-year omnibus farm bill that continued and modified commodity programs through 1985. It set specific target prices for 4 years, eliminated rice allotments and marketing quotas, lowered dairy supports, and made other changes affecting a wide range of USDA activities. The next year this farm bill was amended to freeze the dairy price support level and mandate loan rates and acreage reserve provisions for the 1983 crops (Omnibus Budget Reconciliation Act of 1982, Pub. L. 97–253). Again in 1984, amendments were adopted to freeze target prices, authorize paid land diversion for feed grains, upland cotton, and rice, and provide a wheat payment-in-kind program for 1984 (Agricultural Programs Adjustment Act of 1984, Pub. L. 98–258).
