= Biculturalism =

Coexistence of originally distinct cultures

In sociology, biculturalism is the co-existence of two originally distinct cultures.

Official policy recognizing, fostering, or encouraging biculturalism typically emerges in countries that have emerged from a history of national or ethnic conflict in which neither side has gained complete victory. This condition usually arises from colonial settlement. Resulting conflicts may take place either between the colonisers and indigenous peoples (as in Fiji) and/or between rival groups of colonisers (as in, for example, South Africa). A deliberate policy of biculturalism influences the structures and decisions of governments to ensure that they allocate political and economic power and influence equitably between people and/or groups identified with each side of the cultural divide.

== Examples ==
Examples include the conflicts between Anglophone and Francophone Canadians, between Anglophone White South Africans and Boers, and between the indigenous Māori people and European settlers in New Zealand. The term biculturalism was originally adopted in Canada, most notably by the Royal Commission on Bilingualism and Biculturalism (1963–1969), which recommended that Canada become officially bilingual.

Because the term biculturalism suggests, more or less explicitly, that only two cultures merit formal recognition, advocates of multiculturalism (for which biculturalism formed a precedent) may regard bicultural outlooks as an inadequate descriptor by comparison. This was the case in Canada where Ukrainian Canadians activists such as Jaroslav Rudnyckyj, Paul Yuzyk and other "third force" successfully pressured the Canadian government to adopt multiculturalism as official policy in 1971.

In the context of relations between the cultures of deafness and non-deafness, people find the word "biculturalism" less controversial because the distinction between spoken language and sign language commonly seems like a genuine binary distinction—transcending the distinctions between various spoken languages.

In the context of the United States of America, bicultural distinctions have traditionally existed between the US and Mexico, and between the White and the African-American population of the US.

Regions which formally recognize biculturalism include:

- Belgium, divided basically between speakers of French and of Dutch
- Vanuatu, formerly a condominium with both French and British politico-administrative traditions
- the Polish–Lithuanian Commonwealth, retrospectively termed "The Commonwealth of Both Peoples"
- Switzerland, overwhelmingly German and French in language (though with recognition of Italian and Romansch)
- Paraguay, with a population 90% of which speaks Guaraní and 99% of which speaks Spanish
- New Zealand, where the Treaty of Waitangi forms the basis of a relationship between the Crown and Māori iwi (tribes) through which te reo Māori is recognised as an official language, and Māori have protected representation in Parliament through the Māori electorates
- Hong Kong, where both Chinese and English are official languages

Biculturalism can also refer to individuals (see bicultural identity).

== Public sector human resource management ==
Countries that acknowledge biculturalism can seek to equally represent the interests of both culture groups at a national level. One approach that can be used to achieve this is human resource management in public administration. Several theories can be used to explore its application.

=== Representative bureaucracy in bicultural contexts ===
Representative bureaucracy asserts that when the demographic composition of the public sector workforce matches that of the population, the result is better responsiveness to the public's needs.

In a bicultural context, it involves ensuring that both cultural populations are represented in public sector decision making. Ensuring meaningful participation from them is often considered essential to delivering a responsive and equitable public service.

Equitable representation can be explored using either passive or active perspectives. Symbolic representation does not appear to have been readily applied to bicultural contexts.

==== Passive representation ====
In a bicultural context, passive representation refers to the extent to which the relative proportion of both cultures in the population is reflected in the bureaucracy.

In New Zealand, passive representation is a focus of the Public Service Commission (New Zealand). For example, it was referenced in 2022, when the then New Zealand Public Service Commissioner Peter Hughes stated that the diversity of the New Zealand's public sector workforce should reflect the full diversity of the communities it serves. Progress is evaluated by workforce data. According to it, Māori people represent 16.7% of the public service as at 2024, compared to 17.8% of the population as at March 2023. The proportion of different Iwi in the public service is considered relatively similar to the population.

Under-representation becomes more significant by occupation type. Pākehā are overrepresented among managers; Māori are underrepresented among Chief Executives.

==== Active representation ====
Active representation in a bicultural context refers to the expectation that public service workers from each cultural group will make decisions informed by knowledge of their cultural group. The theory is based on the argument that those from different cultures hold identities that are informed by their shared backgrounds and experiences. In turn, some scholars propose they will be more likely to make judgements that are informed by and reflect the interests of the groups they identify with.

For example, in New Zealand, aspirations towards active representation were recently implied in a report by the Public Service Commission: "the trend towards greater diversity in Public Service workforces is, in part, designed to enable the Public Service to engage better with the diverse communities, families, and individuals that make up New Zealand society".^{a}

Scholars disagree about the importance of equal representation at all levels of the bureaucratic hierarchy, but it is an active concern in New Zealand where Māori have a right to self-determination (see also tino rangatiratanga) under Article 2 of the Treaty of Waitangi. The Public Service Commission actively looks to hire more Māori in leadership positions as part of its work (see Diversity management below).

==== Criticisms of representative bureaucracy in bicultural settings ====
There are several criticisms that apply to representative bureaucracy in bicultural contexts.

Firstly, when public servants are required to work within the norms and values of a single cultural group, they may be constrained from upholding the perspectives of their cultural group in a way that is consistent with active representation. For example, Section 14 of New Zealand's Public Service Act 2020 states that "the role of the public service includes supporting the Crown in its relationships with Māori under the Treaty of Waitangi (te Tiriti o Waitangi)". This suggests that the primary role of a Māori public servant is to support the Crown, over advocating for Māori.

Secondly, workers may be expected to represent their cultural group through extra work that's not an explicit part of their role. Research from New Zealand's Public Service commission in 2022 suggested Māori can feel burdened by expectations that they will increase the cultural capability of their organisation and don't always feel this extra work is appropriately recognised. For example, this can manifest in expectations that Māori staff will organise hui (Māori assembly), lead karakia or act as an iwi liaison.

Thirdly, over-focusing on how members of a cultural group can resolve intra-group inequities risks ignoring the role the whole workforce should play. In New Zealand, such partnership is recognised as one of the Principles of the Treaty of Waitangi. Section 14 of the Public Service Act reflects this stating that senior leadership has a responsibility for "developing and maintaining the capability of the public service to engage with Māori and to understand Māori perspectives".^{b} It is also reflected in the Public Service Commission's strategies (see Diversity management below).

=== Diversity management ===
Diversity management in the workplace involves supporting the coexistence of employees with a wide range of sociocultural, socio-economic, and demographic attributes. It helps bring to life the aim of representative bureaucracy (the mirroring of the population being served), leveraging diversity to deliver better outcomes. It does so through deliberate implementation of initiatives including leadership programmes, mentoring of staff, and the establishment and monitoring of organisational targets.

Establishing, developing and maintaining a diverse workforce means organisations must recognise employees may be attracted to a workplace that actively supports and manages diversity through everyday activities. This may be through transparent remuneration packages; family-friendly or working from home practices; visible expectations for cultural competency; or active staff-led networks for minority groups. Workplaces often focus their attention on HRM diversity practices (recruitment, retention and inclusive development of individuals) that relate to visible diversity traits such as gender or identity attributes, with less focus on systemic inequality, inclusion or the intersects between different dimensions of diversity.

==== Recruiting a culturally-aware public sector workforce ====
NZ government agencies seek to ensure that employees deliver on tasks while upholding public sector values of being impartial, accountable, trustworthy, respectful, and responsive. By attracting candidates with high levels of integrity, it is assumed that service to those in need will be responsive and equitable (within the confines of legislative or programme rules). Public service motivation (PSM) suggests that people who hold these values are more likely to be attracted to work in the public sector, as their motivations are more linked to social outcomes than financial gain or individualistic rewards.

Internationally, NZ ranks highly on several international comparators of trust in government and the public service, with 81% of New Zealanders surveyed reporting trust in public services. Recorded rates of satisfaction and trust vary by demographics, with respondents identifying as Māori having a lower score of 74%. It is not always clear what drives differences in recorded scores, with NZ scores currently being above OECD averages.

The New Zealand Public Service continues to face challenges in securing a diverse workforce, with it being unclear whether this should be attributed to recruitment or retention practices. While strategies and expectations can be set by the Public Service Commission or a specific government agency, hiring decisions are made by individual managers. Both domestic and international research has shown that this means that decision-making may be subject to unconscious bias, with a focus on 'fit' as opposed to 'who is more qualified or to what degree an applicant's application shows the most merit. Issues of bias can occur at the time of recruitment, impact advancement within an organisation, and influence how performance is perceived by managers and HR specialists.

Since 2017, emphasis has been placed on the importance of creating a more diverse and inclusive public service with a focus on five areas; addressing bias; cultural competency; support for employee-led networks; diverse leadership; and inclusive leadership. Refreshed guidance released by the Public Service Commission encourages New Zealand Public Sector Agencies to develop and publish Workforce Diversity action plans, while also confirming a refreshed direction for its workforce diversity strategy with three new focus areas:

- Value diversity of thought and experience
- Attract and retain the widest pool of capable talent
- Apply the merit principle comprehensively.

==== Retention of a diverse workforce ====
Retention is a core concern in human resource management, as high turnover can negatively impact organisations by losing people with valuable diverse experiences, increasing organisational costs linked to recruitment and training, and losing institutional knowledge. In particular, losing minority employees has a direct impact on representative bureaucracy as discussed above. Research suggests that bicultural organisations can strengthen retention by ensuring both cultures are equally blended throughout the organisation's policies and procedures, with genuine power-sharing and recognition of world views. In New Zealand, this would mean te ao Māori (Māori culture), tikanga Māori, and te reo Māori (Māori language) would be actively incorporated into all employee's day to day role, and that Māori have the freedom to exercise tino rangatiratanga (self-determination) over themselves and their work.

Traditional HRM practices have been criticised for reflecting the dominant culture, which can marginalise minority groups. Scholars argue that a more bicultural approach requires active and genuine collaboration with the minority culture to critically assess existing policies and practices to ensure they are culturally appropriate. They further stress that this should not be tick-box exercise where the dominant culture is left as a decision-maker, which is more likely to make minority groups leave the organisation. Research indicates that fulfilling cultural commitments in this way is associated with higher job satisfaction, higher cultural wellbeing, and lower turnover intentions for minority groups. More than this, other diverse groups both within the organisation and out in the public are able to benefit from bicultural practices, as it creates an environment where everyone can feel like they belong and can be supported.

Studies on public sector employment have highlighted the pressures of emotional labour and burnout in the public sector more broadly. However, minority cultures, such as Maōri, are reported to face additional pressures within bicultural organisations such as the cultural double shift. Research drawing on the job demands-resource model has highlighted the importance of balancing these additional cultural demands by increasing resources, such as cultural advisors or additional compensation. Disregarding these increased demands is reported to cause employee burnout, dissatisfaction, high turnover, and poor organisational performance, which not only affects employees but also compromises care and equity for the community the public sector has a duty of care for.

Research shows that when employees are supported, perceive that their colleagues care for them, and can see how they make a difference to their community through their work, they are less likely to experience burnout: instead developing increased self-worth and coping capacity, reducing the impact of high job demands. This same logic can be applied to minority groups in bicultural organisations. By incorporating the Māori concept of whanaungatanga, the building of relationships through shared experiences, employee retention can be improved by creating a culturally safe environment where everyone feels like they belong.

A key contributor to retention is employee perceptions of fairness and recognition. Equity in pay and promotion is another important mechanism for employee retention. In New Zealand, the Māori pay gap was 4.8% in 2024, with that percentage rising for Māori women specifically resulting in occupational segregation. Scholars have suggested that minority groups in bicultural organisations are likely to disproportionally represent employees in junior roles because they have fewer opportunities to join the workforce due to skills or discrimination, or their culture may prevent them from actively seeking out promotions or appropriate pay. For example, Māori employees may be less likely to share individual achievements, reflecting a cultural emphasis on collective rather than individual success. To ensure that minority employees have the right opportunities, it is recommended that organisations regularly assess whether staff with similar qualifications, experience or skills, and who are employed in similar roles are paid equally. Part of this consideration should include a comparison between the dominant and minority cultures, and whether the cultural double shift is factored into existing job descriptions and remuneration. Scholars also emphasise the role of culturally competent management in addressing these differences through adapted evaluation practices and equitable pay structures. Finally, research notes that retention requires organisations to embed anti-discrimination measures and culturally appropriate conflict resolutions that address cultural inequities. Restorative processes, whānau involvement, and having support of cultural advisors within HRM teams are considered to be more effective than applying individualistic models of dispute resolution.

==== Mechanisms for development ====
Training and development are considered essential for embedding bicultural capability in public sector organisations. Unlike diversity programmes in monocultural contexts, bicultural development seeks to build dual cultural competence across the workforce, so that responsibility for cultural knowledge is shared more. Scholars highlight this training should be systemic and ongoing, rather than one-off events, in order to create meaningful capability.

The development process often begins at inductions. In New Zealand, pōwhiri or mihi whakatau are used to welcome new employees and their whānau, establishing an early expectation that biculturalism is part of everyday organisational life. This foundation is then reinforced through ongoing initiatives. For example, the Māori Crown Relations Capability Framework provides public sector agencies with a structured way to assess their maturity and to plan how they will develop the competencies needed to engage effectively with Māori, supporting a culture shift reflecting obligations under the Treaty of Waitangi.

A further dimension of building bicultural capability is reducing reliance on minority employees through the cultural double shift. This redistribution of responsibility not only supports equity within the workplace, but enhances the public sector's ability to deliver culturally appropriate service to diverse communities.

Leadership development plays a significant role in sustaining these efforts. Research has highlighted that visible indigenous leadership strengthens perceptions of authentic bicultural organisations. Scholars argue that development programmes that build minority employees' leadership capability, while also developing cultural competence in the dominant culture's leaders, ensure that organisations can foster genuine, shared authority at senior levels.

Te Puni Kōkiri recommends that bicultural development should not be limited to formal training. While workshops, language classes, and history modules provide important knowledge, experiential learning within cultural environments enables staff to internalise the other culture's values and practices. It is suggested that combining formal and relational learning approaches helps ensure that bicultural competence becomes part of everyday practice, rather than remaining abstract or symbolic.

=== Inclusion ===
While workforce diversity practices enable a greater range of perspectives to be present within an organisation, the degree to which those voices are heard or able to influence decision-making is equally as important. It is the synergising of differences which helps to support inclusive decision-making, which may occur within an organisation or across traditional workplace boundaries.

Inclusion and biculturalism within the New Zealand's public sector can best be understood by looking at three separate but intersecting functions: the establishment of ministerial portfolios; creation of dedicated government Departments or functions; and supporting diversity and/or cultural awareness of public sector employees. (See also: Māori electorates)

==== Ministerial portfolios ====
The existence of a ministerial portfolio shows government intention, providing the warrant holder with the ability to exercise statutory powers, and to influence funding, structural decisions and strategic directions for their reporting government department. The minister may establish strategic goals that cross traditional portfolio boundaries that aim to improve outcomes for Māori across the public sector. This includes influencing diversity, equity and inclusion activities that promote better understanding of the needs of Māori.

The name and scope of ministerial portfolios with responsibility for Māori related issues has changed over time. Following the signing of the Treaty of Waitangi, the role of Chief Protector was established to uphold the rights of Māori. This role was abolished, with the establishment of a dedicated Minister of Native Affairs in 1858 (see also: Minister for Māori Development). In 1947, a refresh occurred with the renaming of the portfolio to Māori Affairs, followed by a change to create a Māori Development portfolio in 2014. This aimed to support Māori to maximise their economic potential Since establishment, four Members of the Executive have held this position.

==== Government departments ====
Te Puni Kōkiri (the Ministry of Māori Development) was established in 1992 following the passing of the Ministry of Māori Development Act 1991. Details of precursor agencies to Te Puni Kōkiri can be read here: Te Puni Kōkiri.

A stand-alone government department, Te Puni Kōkiri's current focus is on the needs and wellbeing of Māori having a vision of "Thriving Whānau" reflecting that when whānau are thriving, so too are communities, hapū, Iwi and all of Aotearoa New Zealand. Its current purpose aims to draw "strength from our past, to build an Aotearoa New Zealand where whānau can all stand, thrive and belong". In practice this means leading public policy for the benefit of Māori; advising on government-Māori relationships; supporting government agencies when developing or implementing policies affecting Māori wellbeing; and administering and monitoring legislation. The latter now includes monitoring progress by government departments and agencies on settlement commitments made by the NZ government for claims made relating to historic breaches of the Treaty of Waitangi.

Alongside this, over the last 20 years government departments have invested in specialised roles both to attract Māori talent, and to better enable entities to deliver on Te Tiriti o Waitangi commitments. This work is underpinned by the direction set by the New Zealand Public Service - Te Kawa Mataaho Public Service Commission. A review by the Office of the Auditor General in 2004 found that there was some potential for confusion between the role of the Public Service Commission and Te Puni Kōkiri when providing policy advice on matters regarding departmental capability; the need for better measurement of the impact of a Māori Responsiveness Strategy developed; and limitations on the capability of the Public Service Commission itself to support Ministers and government Departments on issues of Māori capability.

Since the review was undertaken, significant steps have been taken to create workplaces that reflect and understand the communities that the public service is designed to serve. This includes the establishment of the Papa Pounamu in 2017 to bring together and support standardisation of diversity and inclusion practices across government entities and the development of multiyear Diversity, Equity and inclusion plans.

== See also ==
- Bilingualism
- Creolization
- Interracial marriage
- Canadian identity
- Bilingualism in Canada
- Melting pot
- Salad bowl (cultural idea)
- Cultural mosaic
- Intercultural communication
- Plurinationalism
- One-state solution

== Notes ==
a. pg.12. b. pg. 30.
