= Poundage quota =

A poundage quota, also called a marketing quota, is a quantitative limit on the amount of a commodity that can be marketed under the provisions of a permanent law. Once a common feature of price support programs, this supply control mechanism ended with the quota buyouts for peanuts in 2002 and tobacco in 2004.

Marketing quotas (or allotments) — Authorized by the Agricultural Adjustment Act of 1938, these quotas (sometimes called poundage quotas) limit the marketing of certain commodities. The marketing quota, which must be approved by at least two-thirds of the eligible producers voting in a referendum, is intended to ensure an adequate and normal supply of the commodity, and also ensure that production and supplies are not excessive. Growers who market in excess of their quotas pay penalties on the excess and are ineligible for government price-support loans. Quotas have been suspended for wheat, feed grains, and cotton since the 1960s. Rice quotas were abolished in 1981. Tobacco quotas ended after the 2004 crop (P.L. 108–357, Title VI). Authority for standby marketing allotments for domestically-produced sugar and crystalline fructose was mandated by the 1990 farm bill (P.L. 101–624), but eliminated by the 1996 farm bill (P.L. 104–127). The 2002 farm bill (P.L. 107–171) reintroduced marketing allotments for domestically-produced sugar under the modified sugar program. Marketing allotments are required to be in effect unless USDA projects sugar imports will be above 1.532 million short tons.
