= Pasture Recovery Program =

The Pasture Recovery Program is a program, authorized in the 2001 agriculture appropriations act (P.L. 106-387, Sec. 806 in H.R. 5426), to assist producers in reestablishing permanent vegetative forage crops on pastureland affected by natural disasters during calendar year 2000. The Farm Service Agency (FSA) was authorized to spend up to $40 million from Commodity Credit Corporation (CCC) funds in counties with emergency designations by the USDA.
