= Resource management (disambiguation) =

Resource management is the deployment of organizational resources when and where they are needed.

Resource management may also refer to:

== Physical resources ==
- Environmental resource management, the management of human societies interacting with the environment
- Natural resource management, the management of natural resources
  - Water resource management, managing the use of water resources

== People ==
- Human resource management, the management process of an organization's workforce
  - Human resource management system, the systems and processes between human resource management and information technology
  - Human resource management in public administration, human resource management as it applies to public administration
- Crew resource management, a set of training procedures used primarily for improving air safety
  - Maintenance resource management, an aircraft maintenance variant on crew resource management
  - Single-Pilot Resource Management, an adaptation of Crew Resource Management training to single-pilot operations
- Cultural resources management, the management of cultural resources, such as the arts and heritage

== Computing and technology ==
- Resource management (computing), the management of physical or virtual computer components
- Radio resource management, the system level control of radio transmission characteristics in wireless communication
- Storage resource management, optimizing the efficiency and speed of a storage area network
- Electronic resource management, the practices and systems used by libraries to track electronic information resources
- Data resource management, an organizational function in information systems and computer science that manages data resources
- Distributed resource management, the management of unattended background program execution in computing known as a job scheduler

== Legislation ==
- Resource Management Act 1991, a New Zealand law promoting sustainable management of natural and physical resources
- Resource Management System, a system of conservation practices and management specified in the United States' 2002 Farm Bill

== Other uses ==
- Resource management (gaming), a mechanic in various types of games

== See also ==
- Resource allocation, the assigning of available resources
