= Cotton competitiveness provisions =

The cotton competitiveness provisions are provisions added by the Food, Agriculture, Conservation, and Trade Act of 1990 to the cotton program designed to keep U.S. cotton prices competitive in domestic and export markets. Sometimes referred to as the “three-step competitiveness” provisions.

- Step 1 is the discretionary authority for USDA to reduce the adjusted world price (used in the cotton marketing assistance loan program) when world prices are declining to near the adjusted world price, but U.S. prices are higher than world prices. Though rarely used, the Step 1 adjustment is intended to make marketing loans more effective in keeping U.S. cotton globally competitive.
- Step 2 payments, sometimes referred to as the “user marketing certificate program,” are made to U.S. cotton users and exporters when U.S. prices are higher than world prices. Step 2 payments are intended to bridge price gap and keep U.S. cotton competitive.
- Step 3 mandates the opening of a “special import quota” when the differential between the higher U.S. price for cotton and the lower price for foreign cotton extends for a specified length of time. Its purpose is to allow imports to enter, acting to lower U.S. prices to bring them more in line with world prices. A step 3 quota cannot be established if a limited global quota for upland cotton is in effect, which operates differently and is triggered when other price conditions are met.
