= Fund for Rural America =

The Fund for Rural America, established by the 1996 farm bill (P.L. 104–127, Sec. 793), augmented existing resources for agricultural research and rural development through annual transfers of funds from the U.S. Treasury to USDA. The Fund was notable as the first instance in which mandatory money (in the form of a mandatory annual transfer to USDA from the U.S. Treasury) was provided for research programs, which traditionally receive discretionary funding allocated annually by Congressional appropriators. One-third of the fund was designated for competitive agricultural research grants, one-third for rural development projects, and one-third for either research or rural development, at the Secretary's discretion.

The 1996 farm bill (P.L. 104–127) authorized the U.S. Treasury to transfer $100 million annually to the Fund for three years. However, a recision reduced that to $80 million. The Agricultural Research, Extension, and Education Reform Act of 1998 (P.L.105-185) extended the authority for the program through FY2003 with an annual transfer to USDA of $60 million. However, the omnibus appropriations law for FY1999 (P.L. 105–277, October 21, 1998) prohibited the expenditure of the $60 million for Fund grants and projects.

The fund was repealed in 2002 by the 2002 farm bill (P.L. 107–172, Sec. 6043).
