= Mohair Recourse Loan Program =

The Mohair Recourse Loan Program is a program authorized by the emergency provisions of the FY1999 USDA appropriations act (P.L. 105-277) that made interest-free recourse loans of $2.00 per pound on mohair produced prior to October 1, 1998. Final date to obtain a loan was September 30, 1999. The producer-owned mohair used as loan security had to be stored in approved bonded warehouses. Loans matured not later than 1 year following disbursement. Under the 2002 farm bill (P.L. 107-171, Sec. 1201-1205), mohair was designated a “loan commodity” and made eligible for marketing assistance loans and loan deficiency payments (LDPs).
