= Commodity programs =

In United States federal agricultural policy, the term commodity programs is usually meant to include the commodity price and income support programs administered by the Farm Service Agency and financed by the Commodity Credit Corporation (CCC). The commodities now receiving support are:

1. those receiving Direct and Counter-cyclical Program (DCP) payments, specifically wheat, corn, grain sorghum, barley, oats, upland cotton, rice, soybeans and other oilseeds, and peanuts;
2. those eligible for nonrecourse marketing assistance loans, which includes the previous mentioned commodities plus wool, mohair, honey, dry peas, lentils, and small chickpeas; and
3. those having other unique support, including sugar, and milk.

A broader phrase that includes these commodity programs and other assistance is farm programs.

== See also ==
- Target price
- Loan commodity
