= Great Lakes Basin Soil Erosion and Sediment Control Program =

The Great Lakes Basin Soil Erosion and Sediment Control Program is an American federal and multi-state environmental and agricultural program to water quality, land use, and agricultural productivity pertaining to the Great Lakes Basin. It was authorized by the Farm Security and Rural Investment Act of 2002 (P.L. 107-171, Sec. 2502). Under the program, $5 million is authorized annually in discretionary funds from FY2002 through FY2007 to implement new authority for a soil erosion and sediment control program in this basin that had been established in a number of prior enactments.
