= Desert Terminal Lakes Program =

The Desert Terminal Lakes Program, enacted in Section [?] of the 2002 farm bill (P.L. 107-171, Sec. 2507), authorizes the transfer of $200 million from the Commodity Credit Corporation (CCC) to the Bureau of Reclamation to provide water to "at risk natural desert terminal lakes."

The legislation provided $200 million to the U.S. Bureau of Reclamation "to provide water to at-risk natural desert terminal lakes" but prohibited leasing or purchasing water rights.

A series of subsequent modifications have specifically directed funding for the acquisition of water rights from willing sellers to benefit Walker Lake, including Public Law 108–7, enacted February 20, 2003, specified that funding was to be used to provide water and assistance only for Pyramid, Summit, and Walker lakes in the state of Nevada.

Public Law 109–103, enacted November 19, 2005, allocated $95 million, as follows:

- $70 million to the University of Nevada to 1) acquire from willing sellers land, water appurtenant to the land, and related interests in the Walker River Basin, and 2) to establish and administer an agricultural and natural resources center to undertake research, restoration, and educational activities in the Walker River Basin;
- $10 million for a water lease and purchase program for the Walker River Paiute Tribe;
- $10 million for tamarisk eradication, riparian area restoration, and channel restoration efforts within the Walker River Basin to enhance water delivery to Walker Lake; and
- $5 million to the U.S. Fish and Wildlife Service, the Walker River Paiute Tribe, and the Nevada Department of Wildlife to complete the design and implementation of the Western Inland Trout Initiative and Fishery Improvements in the State of Nevada with an emphasis on the Walker River Basin.

Public Law 110–161, enacted December 26, 2007, allocated $68.25 million, as follows:

- $2.5 million to the United States Fish and Wildlife Service to analyze the impacts of low water flows on reproduction at the Walker Lake fishery, including an analysis of methods to prevent permanent effects on the fishery from low water flows;
- $4 million to the State of Nevada to prepare watershed inventories, with a particular focus on the Walker and Carson River Basins;
- $500,000 for the Walker River Paiute Tribe for legal and professional services in support of settling tribal water claims in the Walker River Basin and to Walker Lake;

Public Law 110–234, Section 2807, enacted May 22, 2008, appropriated an additional $175 million, “to provide water to at-risk natural desert terminal lakes.“ It also specifies that when there are willing sellers, the funding can be used:

- To lease water; and
- To purchase land, water appurtenant to the land, and related interests in the Walker River Basin.

Public Law 111–8, Sections 207 and 208, enacted March 11, 2009, made minor changes to previous allocations and added 2 allocations to be funded from the original $200 million appropriation:

- $300,000 to the Desert Research Institute for LIDAR acquisition data in the Walker River Basin;
- $300,000 to the U.S. Fish and Wildlife Service to assess and monitor the ability of west central Nevada lakes to support migratory loons, and identification of wintering areas and annual range of loons using Walker Lake during migration. Public Law 111–85, Sections 206 through 208, enacted October 28, 2009, modified previous Desert Terminal Lake legislation and allocated $80.7 million, including:
- $66,200,000 to establish the Walker Basin Restoration Program, to be administered by the National Fish and Wildlife Foundation;
- $1 million to the U.S. Geological Survey for Walker River Basin water monitoring program;
