= Krislov =

Krislov is a surname. Notable people with the surname include:

- Marvin Krislov (born 1960), American legal scholar and academic administrator
- Samuel Krislov (born 1929), American political scientist
