= Conservation Corridor Demonstration Program =

The Conservation Corridor Demonstration Program is a government program in the United States. Enacted in the 2002 farm bill (P.L. 107-171, Sec. 2602-2604), it authorizes one or more states on the Delmarva Peninsula (Delaware, Maryland and Virginia) to develop and implement a conservation corridor plan to improve the economic viability of agriculture and environmental integrity of watersheds. Appropriations are authorized at such sums as may be necessary from FY2002 through FY2007 and the federal share will be up to 50% of the total amount.
