= Jonathan Coppess =

American government official

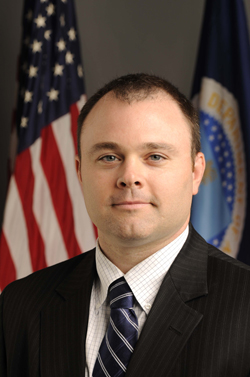
- Official Portrait

Administrator of the Farm Service Agency Department of Agriculture
- Incumbent
- Assumed office July 9, 2009
- President: Barack Obama
- Preceded by: Doug Caruso

Personal details
- Born: Darke County, Ohio
- Spouse: Susan
- Education: George Washington University Law School, Miami University
- Occupation: Legislative assistant, commercial litigator, grain merchandiser, farmer

Jonathan William Coppess was the administrator of the Farm Service Agency (FSA) of the Department of Agriculture, and was appointed on July 9, 2009, by Agriculture Secretary Tom Vilsack.

== Early life and education ==
Coppess grew up on his family's corn and soybean farm, located in Darke County, Ohio, near Union City. He maintains an interest in the seven-generation family farm that his father and brother continue to operate. He earned a J.D. with honors from the George Washington University Law School in Washington, D.C., and received a bachelor's degree in business from Miami University in Oxford, Ohio. He has been admitted to the bar in both the State of Illinois and the District of Columbia.

== Career ==
=== Early career ===
Before moving to Washington to pursue a career in agricultural policy, Coppess practiced law in Chicago for several years as a commercial litigator for Freeborn & Peters, LLP. Prior to attending law school, he worked at Archer Daniels Midland as a Grain Merchandiser. Coppess was responsible for commodity purchasing, processed-product sales, and related hedging activities utilizing the Chicago Board of Trade.

=== Legislative career ===
Prior to joining FSA, Coppess worked for United States Senator Ben Nelson as his legislative assistant for agriculture, energy and environment. In this capacity, he advised Senator Nelson, a member of the Senate Committee on Agriculture, Nutrition, and Forestry, on agricultural issues and worked extensively on the 2008 Farm Bill legislation. Coppess also helped formulate policy on biofuels, rural development, energy, environmental and trade issues.

=== Farm Service Agency ===
Agriculture Secretary Tom Vilsack named Jonathan Coppess administrator of the Farm Service Agency on July 9, only three days after Doug Caruso, who had been appointed in April, abruptly quit. "Jonathan Coppess brings a wealth of agricultural policy experience to USDA's leadership team," Vilsack said. "His farm background will be invaluable as President Obama and I work to assure the soundness of the safety net for American farmers and ranchers."

In November 2020, Coppess was named a member of the Joe Biden presidential transition Agency Review Team to support transition efforts related to the United States Department of Agriculture.

== Personal life ==
Coppess is a registered member of the Democratic Party. Coppess resides in Washington, D.C., with his wife Susan and daughter Abigail.

Political offices
Preceded by Doug Caruso	Administrator of the Farm Service Agency; 2009– Present	Succeeded by Incumbent
