= Initiative for Future Agriculture and Food Systems =

Initiative for Future Agriculture and Food Systems is a competitive research grants program authorized in the Agricultural Research, Extension, and Education Reform Act of 1998 (P.L. 105-185) and reauthorized in the 2002 farm bill (P.L. 107-171, Sec. 7205). The law allows mandatory funds available from savings in food stamp program administration to be used to support the program. Grants were awarded in FY2000 and FY2001; in all other years congressional appropriators have prohibited USDA from spending funds on personnel to operate the program except for oversight of existing grants.
