= Hard white wheat incentive payments =

The hard white wheat incentive payments are payments authorized by the Farm Security and Rural Investment Act passed by the United States Congress in 2002 (P.L. 101–171, Sec. 1616) to encourage the production of hard white wheat. This wheat largely is produced by Australia.
