= Homestead protection =

In the United States, Homestead protection permits the borrower of a United States Department of Agriculture (USDA) loan to convey their agricultural property to the USDA if they can no longer make the loan payments

When a borrower lacks the financial resources to make payments on a delinquent USDA farm loan, is ineligible for a restructured loan, and is unable to buy out the loan at the net recovery value of the collateral property, the USDA will accept the property in lieu of payments.

The 1996 farm bill (P.L. 104–127) reduces the time period in which the borrower may apply to lease and/or purchase the residence and up to 10 acres (40,000 m^{2}) of adjoining land, to within 30 days from acquisition by USDA.
