= Small Watershed Rehabilitation Program =

United States federal environmental legislation

Small Watershed Rehabilitation Program – The Grain Standards and Warehouse Improvement Act of 2000 (P.L. 106–472, Sec 313) authorized cost-sharing to rehabilitate aging structural measures that are part of water resources projects (including structures built under the watershed and flood prevention operations program area of the Natural Resources Conservation Service). The 2002 farm bill (P.L. 107–171, Sec. 2505) authorizes mandatory funding from the Commodity Credit Corporation (CCC) of $45 million in FY2003, rising by $5 million each year through FY2007, and appropriations of $45 million in FY2003, increasing by $10 million each year through FY2007.
