= Normal yield =

Normal yield may refer to:

- Normal yield (agriculture), a measure of productivity
- A form of yield curve in financial economics
