= Grassroots Source Water Protection Program =

The Grassroots Source Water Protection Program, more commonly called the Source Water Protection Program, enacted in the 2002 farm bill (P.L. 107-171, Sec. 2502), authorizes the appropriation of $5 million annually in discretionary funds from FY2002 through FY2007 to use the technical assistance capabilities of rural water associations that operate wellhead or groundwater protection programs.
