= Infoshare =

Infoshare was a program established by the USDA in 1993 to merge and coordinate the business management and information technology (computer) activities of its agencies, particularly in the field, in order to support consolidation of field offices into one-stop field service centers for farmers and other USDA clients. However, the program, which initially had been budgeted at nearly $3 billion, was terminated by early 1996 in the wake of critical reviews by USDA’s Office of Inspector General, the General Accounting Office, and others, which found, among other things, that despite Infoshare, individual USDA agencies were continuing to buy their own computers, were not sharing information technology with each other, and were still not operating in a common computing environment. Infoshare was replaced by another computer modernization initiative designed and coordinated by the Farm Service Agency.
