= Butter-Powder Tilt =

Butter-Powder Tilt is the price adjustment strategy in United States, which requires the USDA to support the farm price of milk at $9.90 per cwt. by standing ready to purchase surplus butter, cheese and nonfat dry milk when wholesale prices for these commodities fall below administratively set levels. The 2002 farm bill (P.L. 107–171, Sec. 1501) allows USDA to adjust the government purchase price of butter and nonfat dry milk twice annually in order to better manage its inventories of surplus milk products and minimize government costs. However, whenever the purchase price of one commodity is reduced by USDA, it must increase the purchase price of the other commodity so that the overall support price of milk remains at $9.90 per cwt. This price adjustment is referred to as the butter-powder tilt.
