= Generic certificates =

In the United States, generic certificates were commodity certificates used by the Commodity Credit Corporation (CCC) in the 1980s to meet payment obligations and simultaneously dispose of commodity inventories. Farmers paid with generic certificates could trade them for commodities owned and stored by the CCC.
