= Dirty, dangerous and demeaning =

Neologism for undesirable manual labor

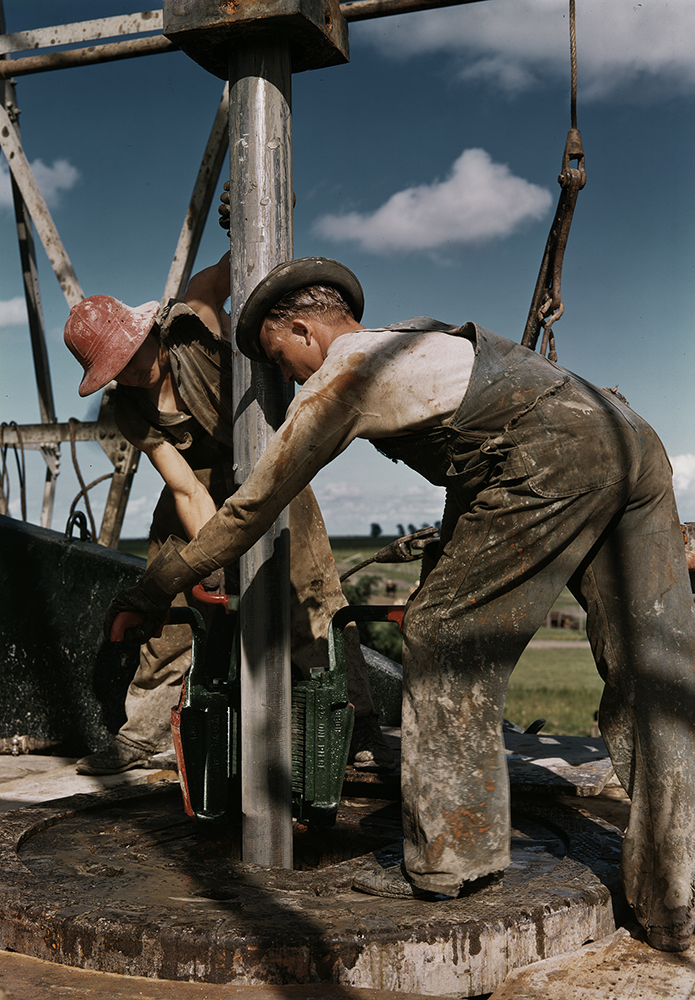
Oil rig drillers can be covered in oil and mud and they work beside dangerous machinery in harsh environments.

"Dirty, dangerous and demeaning" (often "dirty, dangerous and demanding" or "dirty, dangerous and difficult"), also known as the 3Ds, is an American neologism derived from the Asian concept, and refers to certain kinds of labor often performed by unionized blue-collar workers.

The term originated from the Japanese expression 3K: kitanai, kiken, kitsui (respectively 汚い "dirty", 危険 "dangerous", きつい "demanding"), and has subsequently gained widespread use, particularly regarding labor done by migrant workers and burakumin.

Any task fitting the criteria of a 3D job can qualify, regardless of industry. These jobs can bring higher wages due to a shortage of willing qualified individuals and in many world regions are filled by migrant workers looking for higher wages.

== Economic status ==
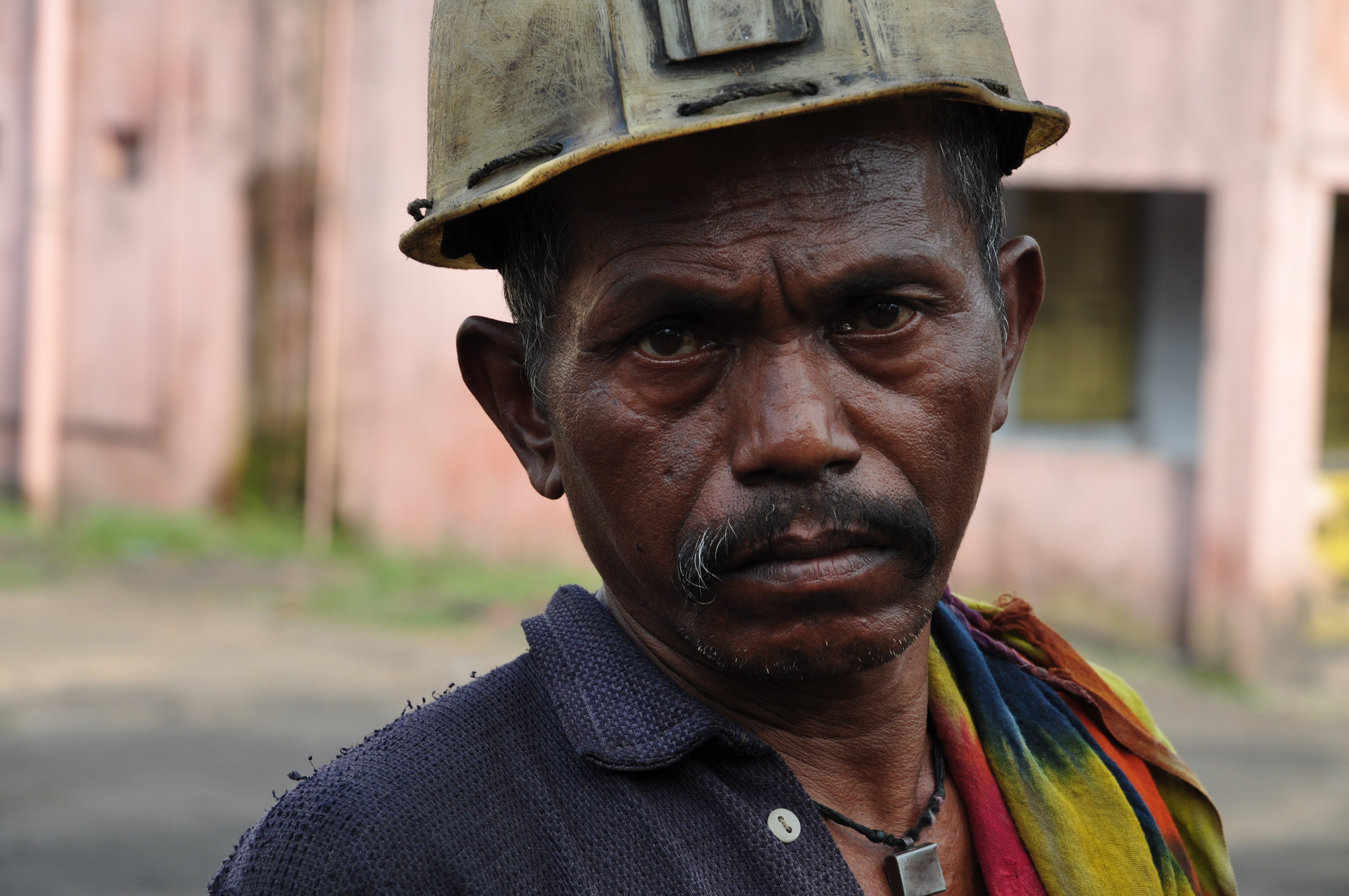
A coal miner in Bachra, India in 2009

Traditionally, workers in 3D professions are better paid in relation to comparable employment available, due to the undesirability of the work, and the resulting need to pay higher wages to attract workers. This has allowed the uneducated and unskilled to earn a living wage by foregoing comfort, personal safety and social status. This concept proves itself in the economic theory of quantity supplied and quantity demanded (see Quantity adjustment). The wages paid to these workers is higher due to the undesirable nature of their professions.

However, in regions where certain classes of workers are restricted to this type of work or there are contributing regional conditions - for example, high unemployment, adjacency to regions with high poverty, or those that are recipient of driven labor migration - there will be workers willing to accept lower than equilibrium wages and then these jobs are not well paid by any definition. Large scale international labor migration, from developing to developed countries since the late 19th century and early 20th century has provided a pool of migrants willing to undertake employment for lower wages than native residents. Higher wages in developed countries are a strong 'pull' factor in international migration, and thus while a migrant worker is willing to accept a comparatively low-wage for a 3D job in a developed country it may mean a significant increase in wages compared to their originating country.

Prominent current examples of migration for 3D wages include Filipino entertainment workers who migrate to Japan, and of Indians and Pakistanis going to the Middle East to work in the construction industry. Migration for 3D wages is not new. In the United States, 3D occupations once filled by Irish and German immigrants, are today held by many Latin Americans.

The highest paying work available to these often unskilled and uneducated (or their foreign certificates of skills and education are not recognized) immigrants is work that is of lower social status, and has a higher risk of injury. As immigrants make up an increasing share of the labor market in countries such as the United States it will become increasingly important for employers to find ways of effectively promoting occupational safety and health among immigrant workers.

These workers are susceptible to exploitation, and without representation can have a difficult time maintaining fair living wages. Since the beginning of the labor movement, immigrant workers in 3D jobs have formed the backbone of many labor unions.

When there are concentrations of low paid workers in 3D occupations, this is artificially created when there are either 'pull' mechanisms that create migrant worker flows or through mechanisms that create subclasses of indigenous populations, through a selective application or an absence of labor protections. Undocumented immigration status is one such mechanism which reinforces the social vulnerability of immigrant workers and can increase their risk for occupational injury and limit their access to institutional resources that protect worker health. In the worst case the concentration is exploitation and can become slavery in its various forms. Historically, the 3D occupations have at times been widely satisfied through forced employment due to the lack of available applicants, a supply of exploitable labor, and either legalization of forced employment or a disregard for the labor laws.

People who find themselves working a 3D occupation will be well paid if they have the protection of the law, poorly paid if they have poor protection of the law or unfair laws, and unpaid if they exist under no protection of the law, no law, or in a society with legal slavery.

Regardless of the hazards, engaging in high risk, low status work can be a way to escape poverty - captured by a line in the Irish folk song Finnegan's Wake, "to rise in the world he carried a hod."

== Risks ==
As the name indicates, dirty, dangerous and demeaning work can impose severe physical and mental costs on workers. There is often a risk of early retirement due to injury, general joint depletion or mental fatigue. After witnessing the constant physical and mental injury to coworkers or even death, the stress can cause mental fatigue and post-traumatic stress disorder.

== See also ==
- Statute of Labourers 1351
- Dangerous jobs
- Robot § Dirty, dangerous, dull, or inaccessible tasks
