= Normal yield (agriculture) =

Term in agricultural economics

Normal yield is an agricultural term that describes the average historic crop yield of a farm.

In the United States, normal yield was once used to determine government-subsidized benefits from commodity programs, but was replaced in the 2002 farm bill by base acreage, payment acres, and payment yield.
