= Representative bureaucracy =

As stated by Donald Kingsley and political scientist Samuel Krislov, representative bureaucracy is a notion that "broad social groups should have spokesman and officeholders in administrative as well as political positions". With this notion, representative bureaucracy is a form of representation that captures most or all aspects of a society's population in the governing body of the state. An experimental study shows that representative bureaucracy can enhance perceived performance and fairness. This study finds that in a “no representation” scenario, respondents reported the lowest perceived performance and fairness, while in scenarios such as “proper representation” (here equal representation) or “over representation” of women, they reported higher perceived performance and fairness.

== History ==
The term representative bureaucracy is generally attributed to J. Donald Kingsley's book titled Representative Bureaucracy that was published in 1944. In his book, Kingsley calls for a " liberalization of social class selection for the English bureaucracy," due to the "Dominance of social, political, and economic elites within the British bureaucracy" which he claimed resulted in programs and political policy that did not meet the needs or interests of all social classes. To solve this issue, Kingsley states that "representative bureaucracy is necessary because there must be at least some administrators sympathetic to the programmatic concerns of the dominant political party". Despite criticism at the time of publication, years later, political scientist Samuel Krislov echoed Kingsley's sentiments in his book also called Representative Bureaucracy and this has been expanded upon since then by a number of scholars all over the world.

In Samuel Krislov's book, he states that in much, if not all, of bureaucracy's history, the perception of bureaucracy has had the identification of being entities covered in red tape and having an antagonistic approach to the public. Also with the association of these ideals heavily ingrained into the public, it is hard to think of the positive aspects of such representation. ( Krislov, Samuel. (2012). Representative Bureaucracy. Quid Pro Books)

There is some degree of disagreement over what constitutes representative bureaucracy as there is a lot of literature that exists on the subject as it has a long history. Scholars Groeneveld and Van de Walle state that there are three dimensions of representative bureaucracy, the first is a historical one, the second is from the perspective of public administration, and the third is in literature on diversity management.

== Global Representative Bureaucracy ==
=== Lead ===
Representative Bureaucracies are critical in both the domestic and international sector. Representing true and absolute diversity may improve delivery of their services in both the developed and developing world. Since international organizations are essentially an extension of public service beyond borders, the presence of representative bureaucracy further translates into benefits for all citizens alike. This integration of diversity can enhance areas of democracy and gender equality, as well as service delivery alike.

=== Social implications of Representative Bureaucracy ===
Domestic Organizations

While there are various theoretical arguments of representative bureaucracy, there is a popular belief that advancing demographic representation can further transform passive representation into active representation. A great amount of governmental entities aim to accurately represent their civilians; thus, representative bureaucracy aims to extend its outreach and ensure policies that are implemented is reflective of its population. This type of inclusivity of all individuals may further guarantee social equality to services, regardless of citizens demographics or socio-economic status.

International Organizations

Representative bureaucracy plays the same critical role in the global sector, with various organizations now ensuring their workplace demographics reflect their target outreach. Often; western powers seem to dominate international decision making within these organizations; such as within the United Nations with ideals identical to their nation's preferences rather than that of the unified global community. Researchers argue representation is a major power, as it constitutes the quality of service delivery from these organizations and to which chosen member states. Most international organizations seek participants from both developing and developed nations alike to ensure a form of power-balance through its initiatives.There have been noted contagion effects as a result of an increase in representation on both domestic and global policy outcomes.

==== Global Gender Representation ====
Demographic representation entails a wide scope of genders, races, religions, and much more. Gender representation, for example, is still one of the greatest hurdles to both developed and developing countries. There is various research stemming various areas of interest, from economical to social analyzers, on the underlying influence bureaucratic representation has on policy and its outcomes on women. Governmental entities are more likely to advance women's rights through policies when there is sufficient representation of them within the public sector.

The United Nations is one of the leading international organizations directing humanitarian services to developing countries. The United Nations has implemented mandates to further ensure gender representation in its workplace. To further ensure equal representation, the UN system has established the Commission on the Status of Women to improve women's participation within UN entities. This trickle down system works by portraying gender equality through United Nations services, which can allow these developing sectors to begin integrating gender equality.

Often; developing nations that receive volunteers from USAID, do not speak the country's native language and are not as efficient in assisting the locals due to language and cultural barriers. Thus; representation in this sector can alleviate some of these hurdles volunteers experience and ensure adequate service delivery, while creating a new relationship between the two.

=== Minority Representation ===
Many countries have taken serious approaches in ensuring their government reflects its civilians by implementing legislation. The absence of such legislation allows underrepresentation to continue in countries. In Europe, for example, the continent is closest to the developing world and has been the home for many well established immigrants and refugees alike. These minorities are a significant attribution to socials services within the United Kingdom, such as within health and governmental entities. Thus; these individuals are seeking a more inclusive government that fully integrates minorities and advocates civil participation.

A true accurate representation of minorities would reflect a proportionate amount of representation within governmental institutions. For example, the illegitimacy of the police stations within minorities in the U.S.A dismisses their service delivery. Theobald and Haider Markel's studies show that passive representation within the police department reinforces legitimacy to these minority groups. This demographic representation has proven to increase their cooperation with the public sector and ultimately produce a safer community for all citizens alike.

== U.S. levels of government ==
=== Local ===
At the local level different studies and surveys have been conducted to evaluate the theory of representative bureaucracy studies and surveys have been done to evaluate whether or not the employees who worked for these government agencies share values with each other across race, sex, gender, age, political ideology, as well as whether or not these employees share values with the citizenry across the same variables. The studies were done to see if these bureaucracies are truly representative of the social groups that make up their citizenry. According to one survey there are great differences in the way black and white administrators and citizens view different issues. The survey found that race plays a huge role in how administrators and citizens view certain issues. There are drastic differences between white and black administrators views and the views of black and white citizens. The study claims black administrators are more similar to their citizen counterparts, white administrators tended to be out of touch with the views of their citizen counterparts. The study found that passive representation can lead to active representation as more individuals of diverse backgrounds work for these local agencies and represent the minorities in the community.

A study by Mark Bradbury and J. Edward Kellough found that black administrators are more likely than white administrators to take on the role as a representative of the minority black community, although they concede that this was for one local government and it is unclear whether or not this translates across racial lines to other ethnic and racial groups, on top of the fact that historical, cultural, and socioeconomic factors were not accounted for.

=== State ===
Studies of state run government agencies were performed to see whether passive representation of nonwhites and women is linked to active representation, meaning whether or not having a diverse group of people working and running the agencies means that the interests of those peoples' larger group (women, nonwhites) will translate into policy outcomes.

One of the studies suggests that to a large degree, the heads of the agencies are responsible for setting the tone for their organization, influencing the culture and agendas of the institutions, establishing the agencies' mission and purpose. As they have so much influence on what the agency does, studies were done to see how different groups (race/ethnicity, sex) place importance on values or an agenda compared to others. The values that the agency heads hold regarding organizational objectives and goals are integral for them defining their jobs as state executives. The studies of 93 different state agencies found that there are differences between the attitudes and values of different ethnic groups, men, and women. Each group places different emphasis of importance on series of different characteristics of the organization. According to the studies, as a group, nonwhites placed more of an emphasis on goals of growing the organization and budget stability, and women placed greater emphasis on values pertaining to organizational proficiency.

The people with the power to appoint agency heads and senior administrative positions can have a direct effect on the direction an agency is taken in under its head.

=== Federal ===
The United States federal bureaucracy is broadly representative of the American people in terms of age, income, education, and the income of the father (used as a variable because it is a good predictor of where one will end up in life). When looking at the civil service from a view of positions held, the bureaucracy becomes less representative. Most decisions are made at the senior and upper levels, so the unrepresentative nature of the elites of the federal government could be grounds to dismiss the idea that the U.S. federal bureaucracy is representative. As one moves through the ranks of the federal bureaucracy one finds that it becomes less and less representative as the positions get higher. From the positions of GS1-GS4 the bureaucracy is fairly representative however from the positions of GS5 - GS14 and above the bureaucracy is significantly unrepresentative. The percentage of nonwhites decreases as one ascends the bureaucratic hierarchy, the same can be said for women. 40% of the American civil service are women and 75% of lower level positions are filled by women, with only 3% of women holding high civil service jobs. Compared to the U.K., Denmark, France, Turkey, and India, the U.S. is the most representative overall and is the best at representing the middle status occupations of countries surveyed.

In Bureaucracy and Constitutionalism by Norton Long, he contends that the American civil service is representative enough to make up for the fact that the political branches of government are not representative. A study by Kenneth Meier agrees that the civil service is the most representative branch of the U.S. government followed by the military, political executives, and lastly the foreign service. Meier indicates that Long's proposal is only weakly supported, as the bureaucracies are not representative at the decision making level. Meier states this is far from a conclusive study.

== Types of Bureaucratic Representation ==
Bureaucratic representation is when it is expected that public administrator and government officials in a bureaucracy represent and conduct duties that are of concern for the interest of the individuals and groups the represent and serve. Studies have shown that there are an endless list of variable linking active and passive representation such as class, race, gender, ethnicity, as well as cultural traits such as language and religion. A number of studies have demonstrated a possible linkage between active and passive representation. Active representation is a process while passive representation is a characteristic. The possible linkage between active and passive is one that is complex and perplexing.

=== Active ===
Active representation is a function that concludes represented groups benefit from representative bureaucracies. Most active representation is concerned with how representation influence policymakers and implementation and assumes that bureaucrats will act purposely on behalf of their counterparts in the general population. An example being, women and men working beside one another within a bureaucracy, women are more likely to actively promote issues and agendas that benefit women in the general population. Potential barriers to active representation are peer pressures that appear within work environments as well as social ones. The pressures placed on bureaucrats of a primary group to conform are notorious within any environment.

=== Passive ===
Representative bureaucracy in the passive sense is the degree to which the social characteristics of the bureaucracy reflect the social characteristics of the populations the bureaucracy serves. Studies of passive representation examine whether the composition of bureaucracies mirrors the demographic composition of the general population. Passive representation exists when bureaucracy's demographic characteristics demonstrate the demographic characteristics of the population. Passive representation can have again different types such as "perfect over representation", "over representation", "proper representation", "under/nominal representation" & "No representation".

=== Symbolic ===
Representative bureaucracy in the symbolic sense is when passive representation can translate into benefits for the citizenry without actions taken by the bureaucrat. Here, the social characteristics of bureaucrats can influence how clients or citizens with similar demographic backgrounds view the legitimacy and trustworthiness of an agency. This might, in turn, encourage those citizens or clients to comply with government agencies or co-produce outcomes with those agencies.

== Effects on society ==
=== Positive ===
- Representative bureaucracy has been proven to help build relationships between employees and their respectable employers. Studies show that people tend to relate more to those who share similar characteristics with. These characteristics include but are not limited to: demographic, age, ethnicity, and socioeconomic status. When representative bureaucracy is utilized, this enables relationships to flourish due to the attempt of even representation of all the previously listed characteristics. In government programs, officials are thought to favor those they can relate to and discriminate others. This can discourage certain ethnicity from applying or receiving benefits. Representative bureaucracy helps to prevent this by providing checks and balances that prevent the favoritism. Representative bureaucracy helps to prevent the bias that is associated with benefits/programming. Although laws do not allow for discrimination, people often subconsciously favor people that resemble them.

=== Negative ===
Some criticisms that are associated with representative bureaucracy are:

- Representative bureaucracy may be too focused on representation instead of productivity. A focus on if everyone is equally represented could lead to a lack of quality out of fear of not being able to achieve equal representation.
- Scholars believe that focusing solely on representation of all people could lead to an easier platform for racism. This focus has a potential to create more hate between ethnicity.

=== Law enforcement ===
- Gender representation in police departments can influence an individual's ability to determine an agency's performance. A study conducted at Rutgers University determined that the active representation of female officers positively influenced agency performance, job performance, trustworthiness, and fairness of the agency. Citizens are thus able to be more likely to be cooperative in the conduction of public safety outcomes. Within the domestic violence unit (DVU), a significant change in citizen behavior was seen towards the agency ability to execute and deliver public safety measures. Although there is no difference for male and female agents in filing reports and pursuing suspects, the "...character of the bureaucrat may nonetheless change encourage the client to actively solicit his or her services.." in a more effective manner.
- Women play an integral role with discretion, implementation, and the enforcement of policies specifically in regards to sexual assault policies. As law enforcement agents are considered street-level bureaucrats, their need to "...exercise discretion, their attitudes, values, and predispositions..." make policy implementation an integral process. The representation of women and minorities within bureaucratic agencies, specifically law enforcement, make immediate positive changes in regards to their targeted demographic groups.
- Studies have shown that racial representation has little effect with street level bureaucrats.
- Representation does not always lead to perceptual improvements among African Americans when they are represented by law enforcement.

=== Education ===
- Research conducted at the University of Kansas investigated the "...impact of minority bureaucratic and political representation on the distribution of disciplinary measures in public schools..." as compared to students within gifted and talented programs.
- Educational institutions are inherently bureaucratic in function and deal with issues regarding a discrepancy in disciplinary action and gifted and talented placement with minorities.
- There is a noticeable difference within gifted and talented school programs about the lack of student representation. Oftentimes educators look over minorities or low-income students and request gifted and talented testing for Caucasian and Asian students. Selection for this program is not contingent upon one teacher, but rather higher up school administrators. In this case, a call for minority administrator representation within educational institutions would be more effective than minority teacher placement.
- Representative bureaucracy within education also focuses on teacher representation. Studies show that having "...a greater presence of black teachers does yield more beneficial outcomes for minority students..." due to the fact that teaching consists of two distinct roles. The first being an allotment of education and second being the execution of discipline.
