= Farm programs =

National agricultural initiatives

In United States agricultural policy, the term farm programs is generally meant to include the commodity programs administered by the Farm Service Agency, as well as the other USDA programs that directly benefit farmers. Some examples of the other programs include farm loans, federal crop insurance, the Noninsured Assistance Program (NAP), the Conservation Reserve Program (CRP), and conservation cost sharing, and the "food stamps" program of SNAP, which is included in each farm spending bill because it acts as a subsidy, keeping crop prices higher by increasing financial demand for food by about eighty billion dollars per year (in 2014).

Supply control: reduces the quantity planted or sold of a crop, which is intended to lower the supply of the good that is available on the market and raise the price of the good above the market equilibrium. This policy also requires some form of enforcement mechanism, which could be a production quota for domestic farmers or restrictions on international trade.

Deficiency payments: a policy where the government pays the difference between a target price they determine and the price that the buyer is supposed to pay. It only occurs on years when the market price is lower than the target price.

Direct payments: decoupled subsidies made directly to farmers, based on previous production. They were deprecated in 2014.
