= Community Fire Protection Program =

The Community Fire Protection Program, enacted in the 2002 farm bill (P.L. 107-171, Sec. 8003), as an amendment to the Cooperative Forestry Assistance Act of 1978 (P.L. 95-313), to provide assistance to communities for fire protection, especially in the wildland–urban interface.
