= Rural Strategic Investment Program =

The Rural Strategic Investment Program is an investment program established by the 2002 farm bill (P.L. 107-171, Sec. 6030) to fund regional investment boards. The Strategic Investment Program provides grants totaling up to $100 million for rural regional planning and plan implementation. Eligible communities are non-metropolitan counties with a population of 50,000 or less. Certain exceptions to the population threshold are allowed if the community is immediately adjacent to an eligible area. (7 U.S.C. 2009dd).
