= Commission on the Application of Payment Limitations for Agriculture =

Commission on the Application of Payment Limitations for Agriculture — The 2002 farm bill (P.L. 107-171, Sec. 1605; 7 U.S.C. 7993), required the creation of a commission to study various economic consequences from a further tightening of the limits on per person farm subsidy payments. The Commission was directed to deliver its report within one year, making it due in May 2003.

== See also ==
- Payment limitations (agriculture)
