= Partnerships and Cooperation Program =

The Partnerships and Cooperation Program, enacted in the United States 2002 farm bill (P.L. 107–171, Sec. 2003), funds special projects recommended by a state conservationist to meet the requirements of three specified federal environmental laws or to address conservation needs in watersheds or other areas with significant environmental problems.

Participants agree to increase environmental benefits through implementation of conservation programs in return for incentive payments. The statute specifies participation criteria, which include: conservation practices that affect multiple producers; sharing information and resources among producers; cumulative conservation benefits in geographic areas; and demonstrating innovative conservation methods. The total made available for this program annually may be up to 5% of the mandatory funding for conservation programs.
