= Adjusted world price =

Adjusted world price (AWP) is statutory terminology used in United States federal agricultural law, for the prevailing world price for upland cotton or rice. It is adjusted to account for U.S. quality and location, calculated and published on a weekly basis by the USDA as part of marketing assistance loan programs. Producers who have taken out the loans may choose to repay them at either the lesser of the established loan rate plus interest, or the announced AWP for that week. The AWP for cotton also is used for determining Step 2 payments.
