= Conservation Farm Option Program =

The Conservation Farm Option Program was authorized by a provision of the 1996 farm bill (P.L. 104-127). It is a pilot program for producers who received production flexibility payments to enter into a contract to consolidate payments at rates that were equivalent to payments that would otherwise be received from the Conservation Reserve Program, Wetlands Reserve Program, and/or the Environmental Quality Incentives Program in exchange for implementing practices to protect soil, water, and wildlife.
