= Conservation of Private Grazing Lands =

Program to preserve and enhance grazing lands

Conservation of Private Grazing Lands is a program, enacted in the 1996 farm bill (P.L. 104–127) and amended by the 2002 farm bill (P.L. 107–171, Sec. 2502), to provide coordinated technical, educational and related assistance to preserve and enhance privately owned grazing lands. It authorizes the creation of two grazing management demonstration districts. Appropriations are authorized at $60 million annually from discretionary funds for FY2002 through FY2007.

The two Grazing Management Demonstration Districts were selected by the Secretary of Agriculture from landowner applications. Those who implemented sound grazing practices will be promoted. Each district is to be supported by a technical advisory committee.
