= Exporter Assistance Initiative =

The Exporter Assistance Initiative is a directive, under of the 2002 farm bill (P.L. 107-171 Sec. 3101), that the Secretary of Agriculture maintain an Internet website for U.S. agricultural exporters that will provide a "comprehensive source of information to facilitate exports" of U.S. agricultural commodities.
