= Honey Recourse Loan Program =

Agriculture program making honey-based recourse loans

The Honey Recourse Loan Program was a program authorized by the emergency provisions of the fiscal year (FY) 1999 United States Department of Agriculture (USDA) appropriations act (P.L. 105–277) that made recourse loans based on a national average rate of $0.56 per pound on 1998-crop honey. Final date to obtain a loan was May 7, 1999. The producer-owned honey was required to be merchantable and stored in acceptable containers. Loans carried an administrative fee of $0.009 per pound, bore an interest rate 1% higher than the Commodity Credit Corporation (CCC) borrowing interest rate, and matured not later than nine months following disbursement.
