= Distance Learning and Telemedicine Grant and Loan Program =

The Distance Learning and Telemedicine Grant and Loan Program (DLT) is a program authorized by the 1990 farm bill (P.L. 101-624) to provide grants to rural schools and health care providers to help them invest in telecommunications facilities and equipment to bring educational and medical resources to rural areas where the services otherwise might be unavailable. The 1996 farm bill (P.L. 104-127) reauthorized and streamlined the program.

The program was also reauthorized in the 2002 farm bill (P.L. 107-171, Sec. 6203).

DLT is administered by the Rural Utilities Service.
