= Feed grain =

Feed grain is any grain used for livestock feed, including grain sorghum, oats, maize, rye, and barley. These grains and the farms producing them historically have received federal commodity program support in the United States. They qualify for marketing assistance loans, direct payments, and counter-cyclical payments under the 2002 farm bill.
