= Limited global quota for upland cotton =

The Limited Global Quota for Upland Cotton is a provision of the Food and Agriculture Act of 1977 (P.L. 95-113) that authorized the President to proclaim an import quota whenever the USDA determines that the spot market average price in any one month exceeds 130% of the previous 36-month average. If triggered by such a determination, the established quota allows for imports of up to 21 days of mill consumption during a 90-day period.

The limited global quota is among several provisions authorized in the bill to keep the U.S. upland cotton spinning industry competitive. These provisions include a special import quota, a limited global import quota, and an economic adjustment assistance payment to users of upland cotton.

A limited global quota cannot overlap with the step 3 quota, one of the cotton competitiveness provisions.

The statutory provision is 7 USC 7937 - Sec. 7937

== Provisions ==
The special import quota is authorized when, for any consecutive 4-week period, the weekly average of the cheapest U.S. (Far Eastern) cotton price quotation exceeds the prevailing world market price (the average of the cheapest five Far Eastern price quotations).

The quota equals 1 week's domestic mill consumption of upland cotton at the seasonally adjusted average consumption rate during the most recent 3 months for which data are available. The quota applies to upland cotton purchased within 90 days after quota announcement and entered into the United States within 180 days after announcement.

The quantity imported under this special import quota during any marketing year (August 1-July 31) is limited to 10 week's domestic mill consumption of upland cotton as established in the first special import quota of any marketing year.
