= Biotechnology and Agricultural Trade Program =

Biotechnology and Agricultural Trade Program — The 2002 farm bill (P.L. 107-171 Sec. 3204) authorizes appropriations of up to $6 million annually for technical assistance and public and private sector project grants to remove or mitigate significant foreign regulatory nontariff barriers to U.S. exports involving: agricultural commodities produced through biotechnology. Funds can also be used to address trade-related food safety, disease, and other sanitary and phytosanitary trade concerns.
