= Agricultural Research, Extension, and Education Reform Act of 1998 =

- Long title: An Act to ensure that federally funded agricultural research, extension, and education address high-priority concerns with national or multistate significance, to reform, extend, and eliminate certain agricultural research programs, and for other purposes.
- Enacted by: the 105th United States Congress
- Effective: June 23, 1998

Citations
- Public law: 105-185
- Statutes at Large: 112 Stat. 523

Legislative history
- Introduced in the Senate as S. 1150 by Richard Lugar (R–IN) on September 5, 1997; Committee consideration by Senate Agriculture, Nutrition, and Forestry; Passed the Senate on October 29, 1997 (Passed); Reported by the joint conference committee on May 12, 1998; agreed to by the Senate on May 12, 1998 (92-8) and by the House on June 4, 1998 (364-50); Signed into law by President Bill Clinton on June 23, 1998

The Agricultural Research, Extension, and Education Reform Act of 1998 (P.L. 105-185) was separate legislation that revised and reauthorized federally supported agricultural research, education, and extension programs from June 1998 through May 2002 (historically, these authorities have been part of an omnibus farm policy law enacted every 4 to 6 years). The 1998 Act built upon reforms that were made in the research title of the farm law in effect at the time, the 1996 farm bill (P.L. 104-127). Key provisions were new accountability measures for recipients of federal research funds, and a new competitive research grant program called the Initiative for Future Agriculture and Food Systems, for which mandatory funds were authorized (annually appropriated discretionary funds support most of USDA’s research, education and extension programs). The 1998 law's provisions, as well as new revisions of research, education, and extension policies, are included in Title VII of the 2002 farm bill (P.L. 107-171).
