= Three entity rule =

The Three entity rule is a rule about farm subsidy payments in the United States. Federal law currently sets an annual cap on the amount of payments that a person may receive from the major farm programs. A provision in this law permits a person to receive payments up to the full cap on the first farm in which the person has a substantial beneficial interest, and up to half the full cap on each of two additional farms; hence the so-called three-entity rule.
