= Technical Assistance for Specialty Crops =

Technical Assistance for Specialty Crops (TASC) provides funding for projects that address sanitary and other technical barriers to the export of specialty crops from the US. It was introduced with the 2002 farm bill (P.L. 107–171, Sec. 3205), giving an annual budget of $2 million in Commodity Credit Corporation (CCC) resources. "Specialty crops" for this purpose are defined as all except a small list of cereals and other major crops. CCC resources are to be for public and private projects and for technical assistance.
