= Other oilseed =

Type of oilseed defined in American agricultural policy

In United States agricultural policy, other oilseed, previously termed minor oilseeds, is defined in the 2002 farm bill (P.L. 101-171, Sec. 1001) as:

- sunflower seed
- rapeseed
- canola
- safflower
- flaxseed
- mustard seed
- another oilseed if so designated by the Secretary of Agriculture.

Previous laws referred to these as minor oilseeds because of their comparatively small production compared to soybeans. These other oilseeds are eligible for Direct and Counter-cyclical Program payments and marketing assistance loans and loan deficiency payments (LDPs).
