= U.S. Sugar Program =

US agricultural price-support program

The U.S. sugar program is the federal commodity support program that maintains a minimum price for sugar, authorized until 2031 by the One Big Beautiful Bill Act (OBBBA). It uses various policies to keep the domestic prices of sugar in the U.S. higher than the world price. It is intended to operate at no cost to the government.

== Program Elements ==
=== Nonrecourse loans ===
The U.S. sugar program makes nonrecourse loans available to sugar processors if prices are below a specified level (24¢/lb. for raw cane sugar, or 32.77¢/lb. for refined beet sugar.) Sugar producers can take out an up-to nine month loan at that rate and use the equivalent amount of sugar as collateral for the loan. A sugar processor can choose to forfeit the loan, at which point the United States Department of Agriculture (USDA) owns the sugar and is responsible for it. A key goal of the U.S. sugar program is to keep prices above the rate where it would be economically preferable for a sugar producer to forfeit the loan.

=== Tariff-rate quotas ===
The U.S. sugar program implements tariff-rate quotas (TRQs) to restrict low-priced imports. World Trade Organization agreements require that the total volume allowed to enter at the low-tier duty be at least 1.11 million tons for raw sugar and twenty-two thousand tons for refined sugar. These TRQs are allocated to Canada and Mexico first, then each additional rate will be allocated on a first-come, first-served basis. Allocations for every country in fiscal year 2026 can be found here. These allocations are based on 40-year old data. Import restrictions are intended to meet U.S. commitments under Uruguay Round Agreement on Agriculture. Mexican imports are currently restricted under a separate agreement that was arrived at after the USITC found that Mexico had engaged in dumping.

=== Domestic marketing allotments ===
The U.S. sugar program implements domestic marketing allotments that restrict the amount of sugar each producer is allowed to sell annually. This allotment is not permitted to be less than 85% of estimated consumption. This is intended to prevent a domestic surplus of sugar, which would depress prices and encourage loan forfeitures.

=== Feedstock Flexibility Program ===
If the previous two price-support measures are insufficient to discourage loan forfeitures, the USDA can buy surplus sugar and sell it to biofuel ethanol producers to attempt to increase the sugar price. If forfeitures do occur, the USDA is required to institute this program with both the forfeited sugar and any sugar that it buys directly. Forfeited sugar may be sold back to the food-use market in the event of an emergency shortfall of sugar for human consumption.

== History ==
The U.S. sugar program in its current form dates back to the 1981 U.S. Farm Bill, which introduced three of the four main elements that remain in the program today. It authorized the Secretary of Agriculture to support sugar prices and keep them above established levels by offering nonrecourse loans, buying processed sugar, and imposing import restrictions.

Significant modifications were made in the 2008 Farm Bill. This introduced the ethanol backstop, which was continued in the 2014 Farm Bill.

In 2025, the OBBBA increased the loan rates the current rates of 24¢/lb. for raw cane sugar, or 32.77¢/lb. for refined beet sugar.

== Results ==
The U.S. sugar program has led to two main outcomes: Higher sugar prices and higher profits for farmers. According to USDA data, in FY2025, sugar prices in the United States were 36.90¢/pound. The world price was 18.58¢/pound. Multiple analyses by agricultural economists have attributed higher prices to the Sugar Program.

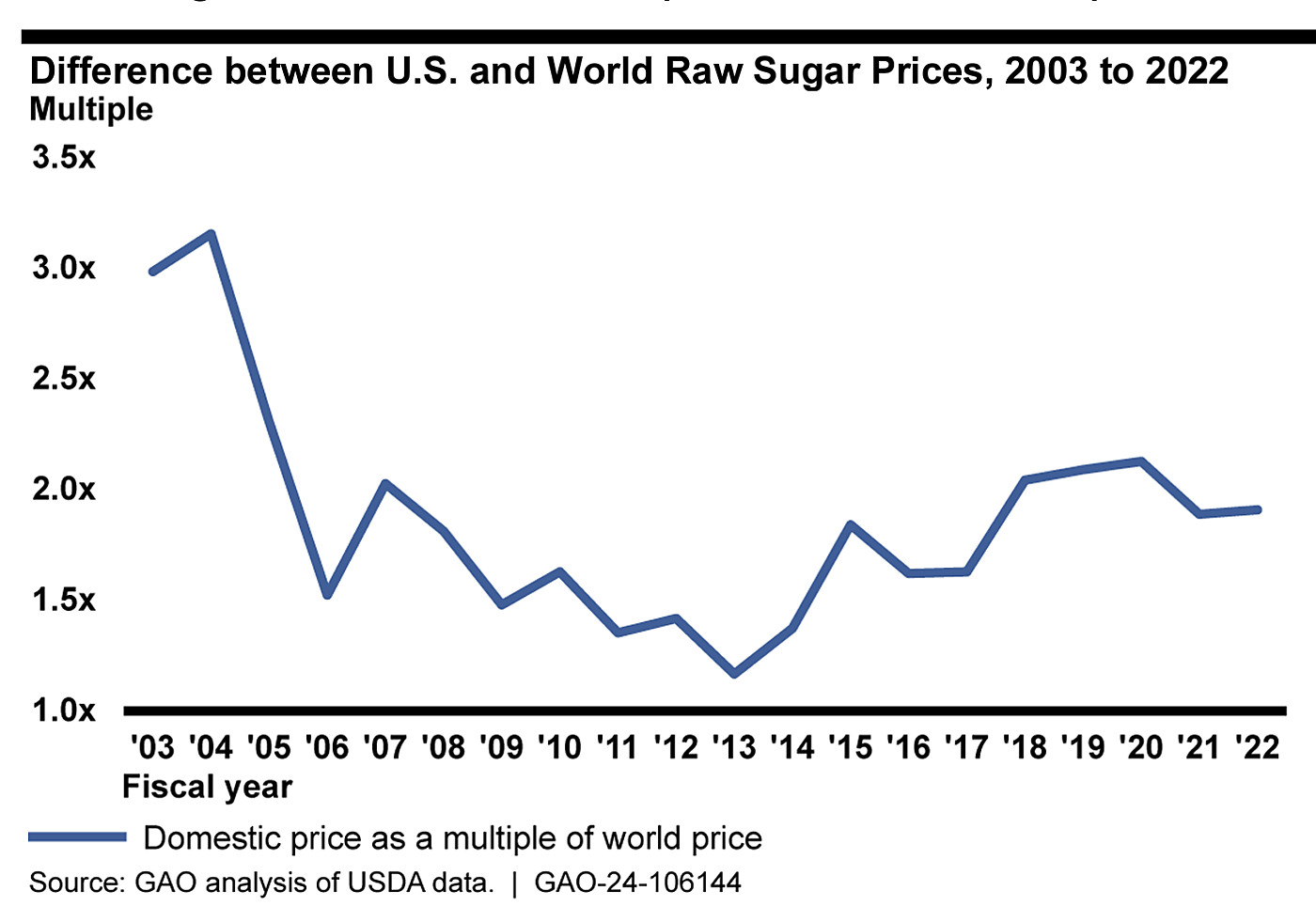
Difference between U.S. and World Raw Sugar Prices, 2003-2022

The impact of this, according to the American Enterprise Institute's John Beghin, is that "US sugar program has been shown to cost consumers $2.4–$4 billion a year and induce losses of 17,000 to 20,000 jobs in the food processing and confectionery industries."

These costs are partially offset by increased profits for farmers. An October 2023 research review by the Government Accountability Office concludes that "Because the program guarantees relatively high prices for domestic sugar, sugar farmers benefit significantly... research GAO reviewed suggests the U.S. sugar program results in an increase in domestic sugar production and higher profits for farmers, totaling an estimated $1.4 billion to $2.7 billion in additional benefits annually. The U.S. sugar program creates net costs to the economy, because higher sugar prices created by the program cost consumers more than producers benefit, according to research GAO reviewed."
