= Commodity certificate =

Commodity certificates are payments issued by the Commodity Credit Corporation (CCC) in lieu of cash payments to participants in farm subsidy or agricultural export programs. Holders of certificates are permitted to exchange them for commodities owned by the CCC. Alternatively, farmers may buy certificates and use them to settle marketing assistance loans as a way of avoiding per person payment limits on marketing loan gains and loan deficiency payments (LDPs).
