= Quick Start Programme =

- Abbreviation: QSP
- Established: 2006
- Type: Fund, policy framework
- Headquarters: Geneva
- Region served: Worldwide
- Website: www.saicm.org/Implementation/QuickStartProgramme

The Quick Start Programme (also known as the QSP) is a fund administered by the United Nations Environment Programme. By Resolution I/4 of the First Session of the International Conference on Chemicals Management, it has been granted the responsibility to act as the financial arm of the Strategic Approach to International Chemicals Management.

The QSP now has become a fund of approximately US$123.2 million, with an investment portfolio of 184 projects in 108 different countries, including 54 Least Developed Countries and Small Island Developing States.
