= Quality Samples Program =

The Quality Samples Program (QSP) is a pilot program, started in 2000 and administered by the Foreign Agricultural Service (FAS), that utilizes Commodity Credit Corporation (CCC) funds to reimburse U.S. agricultural trade organizations for the cost of providing small samples of U.S. products to potential importers located in overseas emerging markets.
