= Resource Management System =

Resource Management System, as defined in the United States' Farm Security and Rural Investment Act of 2002 (also known as the 2002 Farm Bill) (P.L. 107–171, Sec. 2001), is a system of conservation practices and management specified in the field office technical guide of the Natural Resources Conservation Service (NRCS) which is designed to prevent resource degradation and permit sustained use of natural resources.
