= Loan commodities =

Under the 2002 farm bill (P.L. 101-171, Sec. 1201-1205), the following commodities are eligible for marketing assistance loans and are called loan commodities: wheat, corn, grain sorghum, barley, oats, upland cotton, extra long staple (ELS) cotton, rice, soybeans, other oilseeds, wool, mohair, honey, dry peas, lentils, and small chickpeas. With the exception of extra long staple cotton, farmers agreeing to forgo the loans are eligible for loan deficiency payments (LDPs) on actual production of loan commodities.
