= Quantity adjustment =

Concept in economics relating changes in supply to changes in price and vice versa

In economics, quantity adjustment is the process by which a market surplus leads to a cut-back in the quantity supplied or a market shortage causes an increase in supplied quantity. It is one possible result of supply and demand disequilibrium in a market. Quantity adjustment is complementary to pricing.

In the textbook story, favored by the followers of Léon Walras, if the quantity demanded does not equal the quantity supplied in a market, "price adjustment" is the rule: if there is a market surplus or glut (excess supply), prices fall, ending the glut, while a shortage (excess demand) causes price to rise. A simple model for price adjustment is the Evans price adjustment model, which proposes the differential equation:

$$\frac{dP}{dt} = k (QD-QS),$$

This says that the rate of change of the price (P) is proportional to the difference between the quantity demanded (QD) and the quantity supplied (QS).

However, instead of price adjustment — or, more likely, simultaneously with price adjustment — quantities may adjust: a market surplus leads to a cut-back in the quantity supplied, while a shortage causes a cut-back in the quantity demanded. The "short side" of the market dominates, with limited quantity demanded constraining supply in the first case and limited quantity supplied constraining demand in the second.

Economist Alfred Marshall saw market adjustment in quantity-adjustment terms in the short run. During a given "market day", the amount of goods on the market was given -- but it adjusts in the short run, a longer period: if the "supply price" (the price suppliers were willing to accept) was below the "demand price" (what purchasers were willing to pay), the quantity in the market would rise. If the supply price exceeded the demand price, on the other hand, the quantity on the market would fall. Marshallian quantity adjustment is described as follows:

$$\frac{dQS}{dt} = k (DP-SP),$$

This says that the rate of change of the quantity supplied is proportional to the difference between the demand price (DP) and the supply price (SP).

Quantity adjustment contrasts with the tradition of Léon Walras and general equilibrium. For Walras, (ideal) markets operated as if there were an Auctioneer who called out prices and asked for quantities supplied and demanded. Prices were then varied (in a process called tatonnement or groping) until the market "cleared", with each quantity demanded equal to the corresponding quantity supplied. In this pure theory, no actual trading was allowed until the market-clearing price was determined. In the Walrasian system, only price adjustment operated to equate the quantity supplied with the quantity demanded.
