= Samuel Krislov =

American political scientist (1929–2025)

Samuel Krislov (October 5, 1929 – August 11, 2025) was an American academic who was Professor of Political Science and Law at the University of Minnesota.

== Life and career ==
Born and raised in Cleveland, Ohio, he was the third child of Isaak Krislov and Gertrude Hutner. He received his B.A. and M.A. from New York University and his Ph.D. from Princeton University.

His areas of interest included comparative politics, governance, the Supreme Court, the political process, and Israeli courts, politics and society.

He was also president of the Law and Society Association and the Midwest Political Science Association.

Krislov died on August 11, 2025, at the age of 95.
