= Human resource management in public administration =

Human resource management in public administration concerns human resource management as it applies specifically to the field of public administration. It is considered to be an in-house structure that ensures unbiased treatment, ethical standards, and promotes a value-based system.

== Function ==
The function of human resources management is to provide the employees with the capability to manage: healthcare, record keeping, promotion and advancement, benefits, compensation, etc. The function, in terms of the employers benefit, is to create a management system to achieve long-term goals and plans. The management allows companies to study, target, and execute long-term employment goals. For any company to have an efficient ability to grow and advance human resource management is a key.

Human resources are designed to manage the following:

- Employee Benefits: include various types of non-wage compensation provided to employees in addition to their normal wages or salaries.
- Employee health care: the identification of recognition of a disease by a physician/ physician's assistant/nurse practitioner.
- Compensation: something, typically money, awarded to someone as a recompense for loss, injury, or suffering.
- Annual, sick, and personal leave: excused (and generally unpaid) leave for unexpected (such as accident or sickness) or expected (anniversaries, birthdays, marriage) events important to the individual.
- Sick banks: a fund accumulated to pay off a corporate or public debt
- Discipline: the practice of training people to obey rules or a code of behavior, using punishment to correct disobedience.
- Records (tax information, personnel files, etc.):also known as records and information management or RIM, is the professional practice of managing the records of an organization throughout their life cycle, from the time they are created to their eventual disposal.
- Recruitment and employee retention strategies:refers to the ability of an organization to retain its employees
- Salary and Wages Administrations : process of compensating an organization's employees in accordance with accepted policy and procedures

== Leading contributors ==
Historically, when a new president came into power, political leaders would appoint their supporters to political offices in thanks for the campaign assistance. This became known as the spoils system and became popular in the United States during the presidency of Andrew Jackson. In his first address to Congress, Jackson defended the system; he believed that public offices should be rotated among supporters to help the nation achieve its ideals. Jackson maintained that to perform well in public office, did not require special intelligence or training and rotating the office would ensure that the government did not develop corrupt civil servants. The system was viewed as a reward to supporters of the party and a way to build a stronger government. During the first 18 months of Jackson's presidency he replaced fewer than 1,000 of the 10,000 civil servants due to politics, and fewer than 20 percent of officeholders were removed. Many of the men Jackson appointed to offices came from backgrounds of wealth and high social status. The system continued after Jackson's presidency and opposition against the system began to grow. During the presidency of Ulysses S. Grant corruption and inefficiency began to reach staggering proportion. This led to a larger outcry against the system and helped bring about change in 1883.

George H. Pendleton: Senator from Ohio sponsored the Civil Service Reform Act in 1883, which sought to implement a merit-based program in the federal government. Its principal tenets include:

- Hiring employees by merit
- Receiving pay according to position, not personal characteristics
- Protection from political interference and dismissal via regime changes
- Government workers have an obligation to accountability (transparency)

Chester Barnard: taught an organization was the cooperation of human activity and to survive an organization needed to have efficiency and effectiveness. His definition of effectiveness: being able to accomplish the goals that were set and efficiency – if the goals are reached by the individuals of the organization then cooperation among them will continue.

Paul C. Light: discusses the Shadow Government and how it is used to make the Federal government appear smaller, even as the Federal government grows. The Shadow Government is made up of those entities that produce goods or services for the government under contracts, grants, or mandates.

Volcker Commission: also known as the National Commission on Public Service was established in 1989, to rebuild the federal civil service. The commission was established by the United States Chairman of the Federal Reserve Paul A. Volcker. The main concern of the commission was morale because it was beginning to fall as were recruitment and retention among civil service employees and would soon become a crisis. This possible crisis was believed to be hindering the ability of the government to function effectively as the demand on the government began to grow.

The commission identified three main threats:

Public attitudes and political leadership: the public did not trust or respect the government and the leaders. This also included federal agencies.

Internal management systems: the federal agencies were losing experienced personnel due to problems with the leadership in the federal agencies. Mid-level workers were leaving the departments and entry level recruits were rethinking the commitments they made to the government.

The commission made some recommendations to address the problems. These included:

Strengthening the relationship between presidential appointees and career civil servants by building a spirit of partnership between the two.

Reducing the number of presidential appointees so that there is more room at the top for civil servants.

Providing competitive pay to aid in recruiting and retaining excellent people while demanding competitive performance of them.

== Pertinent legislating ==
Pendleton Civil Service Reform Act 1883: designed to end to the spoils system and provide federal government jobs based on merit and be selected through competitive exams. The act also made firing and demoting employees for political reasons unlawful. It also made requiring employees to give political service or contributions unlawful. The act also established the Civil Service Commission to enforce these rules. It was used to reinforce the efficiency of government.

Civil Service Reform Act of 1978: encompassed a wide variety of reforms including the creation of the Office of Personnel Management (OPM), the Merit Systems Protection Board (MSPB), The Federal Labor Relations Authority, and abolished the Civil Service Commission. The act seeks greater accountability of federal employees for their performance. The act also provides protection for "whistleblowers" and employees calling attention to any government malpractices.

Hatch Act of 1939: was passed into legislation to prohibit federal government employees from participating in certain political activities both on and off duty. The employee could not support or oppose a political party, partisan political group, or a candidate for a partisan political party.

In 1993, Congress passed legislation that amended the act as it applies to federal employees. Under the amendment most federal employees are now able to take part in political management and political campaigns. The act also applies to local and state employees who are employed with programs financed by loan or grants from the government or a federal agency. If the employee works for a research or educational institutions supported by a state, the employee is not under the restrictions of the act. The government employees that are covered by the new amendment are in executive agencies or in positions in the U.S. Postal Service and Postal Rate Commission.

Classification Act of 1949: established the classification standards program, this law states that positions are to be classified based on the duties and responsibilities assigned and the qualifications required to do the work. The position classifications standards are built on the foundation of the grade levels.

Title VII from Civil Rights Act of 1964: founded the Equal Employment Opportunity Commission (EEOC) and forbade discrimination in hiring, firing, and compensation based on race, color, religion, gender, or national origin. It is also unlawful for an employer to segregate, limit, or classify employees in any way that will deprive them of employment opportunities or affect their employment status. In addition, it is unlawful to discriminate on these five bases in an apprenticeship, training, or retraining programs.

Enhancement of Health Department Capacity for Health Care- Associated Infection Prevention Through Recovery Act-Funded Programs 2009 : this program resulted in increases capacity for HAI surveillance and prevention across all 51 state and territorial health departments that received funding.

== Human Resource Management Focus In Equal Employment Opportunity (EEO) ==
Equal Employment Opportunity is continually in the spotlight of human resource (HR) management even after over 40 years of progress. The number of EEO complaints and lawsuits remains significant, indicating that ongoing progress is needed to decrease employment discrimination. EEO issues in HR Management are so prevalent that it has become one of the biggest concerns for HR professionals.

While HR professionals agree that equal employment opportunities are a legitimate focus, there is considerable controversy over best way to achieve equality. One way is to use the "blind to differences" approach, which argues that differences among people should be ignored and everyone should be treated equally. The second common approach is affirmative action, through which employers are urged to employ people based on their race, age, gender, or national origin. The idea is to make up for historical discrimination by giving groups who have been affected enhanced opportunities for employment." The former approach emphasizes equal treatment regardless of individual differences; the latter emphasizes fairness based on individual circumstances.

Thus, it is important for HR professionals to understand Equal Employment Opportunity (EEO) discrimination process because of the significant complaints and lawsuits that will undoubtedly be encountered throughout HR Management. "This discussion is to enhance the reader's understanding of the EEO process; the parts in each section of this discussion track the EEO process as chronologically as possible. However, the goal of this discussion is not to provide an exhaustive study of complex legal subjects. Digest summaries and articles themselves do not have the force of law and the reader is advised to look to the actual decisions and other sources discussed for a more precise understanding of applicable EEO law." For a more detailed discussion of the topics addressed in this Digest, see EEOC's website at "www.eeoc.gov" and the statutes, regulations, decisions, guidance, and directives cited in these articles.

Initiating and Navigating the EEO Process

Part 1: The Pre-Complaint Process

The EEO process is initiated when an individual contacts an EEO counselor concerning a suspected violation of one or more of the laws that the Equal Employment Opportunity Commission (EEOC) enforces. "The Commission's regulations, promulgated under applicable statutory law, can be found in relevant parts in Title 29 of the Code of Federal Regulations ("Labor"). The federal sector process itself is detailed in 29 C.F.R. Part 1614 (1999); and further amplified in Management Directive 110 (1999) (hereinafter, Maryland-110). MD-110 has often been referred to as the EEO counselor's "bible" for the wealth of information, appendices, and forms contained therein regarding the EEO process and is available online to the public at: http://www.eeoc.gov/federal/index.cfm"

Under the EEOC-enforced statutes currently in force, there are 8 bases of employment discrimination that may be alleged regarding an agency action, policy, or practice in the EEO process. "The U.S. Equal Employment Opportunity Commission (EEOC) is responsible for enforcing federal laws that make it illegal to discriminate against a job applicant or an employee because of the person's race, color, religion, sex (including pregnancy), national origin, age (40 or older), disability or genetic information. It is also illegal to discriminate against a person because the person complained about discrimination, filed a charge of discrimination, or participated in an employment discrimination investigation or lawsuit."

"Most employers with at least 15 employees are covered by EEOC laws (20 employees in age discrimination cases). Most labor unions and employment agencies are also covered. The laws apply to all types of work situations, including hiring, firing, promotions, harassment, training, wages, and benefits."

Once an individual has filed a charge of discrimination, it is important that the individual must adhere to certain time frames and follow specified procedures in order to avoid dismissal of their complaints. For example, an EEO complaint may possibly be dismissed for failure to begin EEO counseling within 45 days of the suspected discriminatory incident or effective date of alleged discriminatory personnel action.

However, an "aggrieved person" or "counselee" must consult with an EEO counselor prior to filing a complaint in order to resolve the disputed matter informally. The counselor's role is to provide a solution of the alleged discrimination before the complaint is formally filed. After which, during the 30-day period the Counselor is to complete counseling, provide for the counselee (i.e., the aggrieved person) a written list of the counselee's rights and responsibilities. These include the following:

- The right to request a hearing or an immediate final decision after an investigation by the agency.
- The responsibility to exercise certain election rights (which will be specified later in this section).
- The right to file a civil action in federal court after filing with EEOC a notice of intent to sue under the ADEA instead of pursuing a complaint of age discrimination in the administrative EEO process.
- The need to be aware of administrative EEO and federal court time frames.
- An understanding that only the claims raised in pre-complaint counseling (or issues and claims like or related to issues or claims raised in pre-complaint counseling) may be alleged in a subsequent complaint filed with the agency.

"Such EEO contact must occur within 45 days of when the aggrieved person knew or should have known of the alleged discriminatory matter, or, in the case of a personnel action, within 45 days of the effective date of the personnel action. At the time of initiating EEO counseling and throughout the EEO process, the counselee is permitted to have a representative who may be, but is not required to be, an attorney. The counselor, who may be an agency employee and work either full-time in EEO or in a collateral duty role, is required to be neutral and favor neither the counselee nor the agency."

"Failure of the aggrieved person to raise a matter in counseling may result in subsequent dismissal of the formal EEO complaint. Through the counseling process claims are set forth and clarified, and the counselor conducts a limited inquiry (not an investigation) for the purpose of achieving resolution."

During the counselor's inquiry, the counselor may utilize certain procedures common to mediation but does not engage in actual mediation, even if that counselor is also a certified mediator. Throughout this counseling, or pre-complaint stage, the Counselor will also notify the counselee of pertinent legal choices that are available. Also, during this process the EEO counselor must inform the counselee that, where the agency offers ADR, the counselee must elect to choose between engaging in ADR or continuing informal counseling, but not both. Despite the choice of ADR or continuing the process of informal counseling, if resolution is not achieved, the counselee will have the opportunity to file a formal EEO complaint. "The ADR process in the pre-complaint phase is limited to a maximum of 90 days. However, the EEOC encourages the parties to engage in ADR to attempt to resolve their dispute at any subsequent time up to and including the appellate process."

Further, "Counselors must advise individuals of their duty to keep the agency and Commission informed of their current address and to serve copies of appeal papers on the agency. The notice [of the right to file a formal complaint within 15 days of the counselee's receipt of the notice] shall include notice of the right to file a class complaint. If the aggrieved person informs the Counselor that he or she wishes to file a class complaint, the counselor shall explain the class complaint procedures and the responsibilities of a class agent."

The Counselor must also notify the counselee of his or her right to remain anonymous until the grievance is officially filed, where and with whom the formal complaint is to be filed, "and of the complainant's duty to assure that the agency is informed immediately if the complainant retains counsel or a representative" In addition, "the Counselor shall not attempt in any way to hinder the aggrieved person from filing a complaint."

Before a formal complaint may go to federal court as a civil action to pursue the aggrieved individual's discrimination claims, the EEO administrative process reviews the claim. This is known as [exhaustion of administrative remedies]. "In complaints concerning Title VII, the Rehabilitation Act, and the ADEA—where the complainant chooses to go through the EEO process--the "exhaustion" requirement is satisfied after 180 days from the filing of the individual complaint or the class complaint if an appeal has not been filed and final action has not been taken by the agency." Equal Pay Act claims, on the other hand, must be filed within two years (or three years for willful violations) of the alleged discrimination, despite their standing in the administrative process.

There are exceptions to the above requirement. An EEO complaint filed under the ADEA may exempt a complaint from the above requirement. If the complaint gives the commission at least 30 days written notice of the intent to file an action, it may bypass the EEO process and go directly to a U.S. District Court and file a civil action naming the head of an allegedly discriminating agency. "A complainant who is asserting a claim under the EPA, however, may bypass the EEO administrative process completely and go directly to court. The filing of a civil action by the complainant will terminate the processing of an administrative complaint or appeal filed with the EEOC, and, therefore, the complainant should notify the agency and Commission when s/he has filed a civil action."

In addition to the claim processes discussed, a counselee may have to choose between continuing his or her claims in the negotiated grievance process or the EEO process. "When an aggrieved person is employed by an agency that is subject to 5 U.S.C. 7121(d), and is covered by a collective bargaining agreement that permits claims of discrimination to be raised in a negotiated grievance procedure, that employee must elect to proceed either through the EEO process or the negotiated grievance procedure, but not both." However, a complainant should be aware that, if he or she chooses to pursue a negotiated grievance before filing an EEO complaint, the time limitations in the EEO process will not be extended unless the agency consents to an extension in writing.

Another important election that an EEO Counselor must inform the counselee of is mixed cases. Essentially, a mixed case is a claim of discrimination that is appealable to the Merit Systems Protection Board (MSPB). Regulations related to mixed cases can be found at 29 C.F.R. § 1614.302. To determine if MSPB may have jurisdiction there are two important questions that must be answered. First, does the employee have standing to appear before the MSPB? "For example, a probationary employee does not have standing to go to MSPB on an EEO-based claim. Employees of certain agencies, e.g., the FBI, CIA, TVA, the U.S. Postal Service, and certain non-appropriated fund activities (such as the Army and Air Force Exchange) do not have standing. Those employees may, however, pursue their claims through the regular EEO process with their agency." Secondly, does the claim occur from an action appealable to MSPB? Commonly, the more severe the personnel action at hand, the more likely it will be appealable to MSPB, e.g., removal, suspension for more than 14 days, and reduction in grade.

In short, an aggrieved individual can file a mixed case complaint with the agency or a mixed case appeal with the MSPB but not both at the same time. The aggrieved person must choose one or the other. In the initial case of a mixed case complaint being filed, the complaint proceeds through the EEO process as with any EEO complaint, with these exceptions:

- There is no right to a hearing before an EEOC administrative judge (AJ) after an investigation.
- The investigation is limited to 120 days (not 180).
- The agency must issue a final agency decision (FAD) within 45 days following the investigation.
- If dissatisfied with the FAD, complainant must appeal the FAD, within 30 days of receipt of the FAD, to the MSPB (not to the EEOC).

If the aggrieved individual chooses to file a mixed case "appeal" instead of a mixed case "complaint", then this individual may request a hearing before an MSPB administrative judge (AJ) but not an EEOC administrative judge (AJ). Afterwards, if the aggrieved individual is dissatisfied with the MSPB's verdict on his or her claims of discrimination under the statutes the EEOC enforces, they may choose to file a petition with the EEOC from the MSPB decision.

Part 2: Filing the Individual Complaint

Once the counseling is over and if there has been no resolution to the claim or claims, the EEO counselor must provide the counselee with a Notice of Final Interview and the Right to File a Formal Complaint with the appropriate agency official. The counselee then is required to file the formal complaint within a time period of 15 days once the Notice of Final Interview has been received. This complaint must be signed by either the complainant or the individual's attorney. The complaint is also required to contain a phone number and address where the complainant or his or her attorney can be reached. The complainant is responsible for proceeding with the complaint with or without a designated representative.

The formal complaint must contain a precise statement that identifies the aggrieved individual and the agency and the actions or practices that form the basis of the complaint. The agency in turn, must provide the complainant with written acknowledgement of the complaint and the date of filing. The agency's acknowledgement letter will include the following information:

- The address of the EEOC office where a request for a hearing is to be sent.
- The right to appeal the final action on or dismissal of a complaint.
- The requirement that the agency conduct an impartial and appropriate investigation within 180 days of the filing of the complaint unless the parties agree in writing to extend the time period.

Part 3: Amending and Consolidating Complaints

A complainant may amend a pending complaint to add claims that are related or similar to those raised in the pending complaint, prior to the agency's mailing of the notice required by 29 C.F.R. § 1614.108(f) at the conclusion of the investigation. If the complainant needs to add or amend a new incident of alleged discrimination during the processing of an EEO complaint, the complainant will be instructed by the investigator or other EEO staff person to submit a letter to the agency's EEO Director or Complaints Manager at that time. The letter submitted must describe the new incident or amendments added by the complainant. Once the EEO officials review this request and determine the proper handling of the amendment they will decide if new EEO counseling is required. No new counseling is required when:

- Additional evidence is offered in support of the existing claim, but does not raise a new claim.
- The incident raises a new claim that is like or related to the claims(s) raised in the pending complaint.

"Additional evidence becomes part of the investigation of the pending claim and the complainant is so notified. The complaint must be amended where a new claim is like or related to the claim(s) raised in the pending complaint, and the EEO official must notify both the complainant and the investigator, in writing, acknowledging receipt of the amendment and the date it was filed. The EEO official will also instruct the investigator to investigate the new claim. New counseling will be required if the new claim is not like or related to the claim(s) in the pending complaint. The new claim will be the subject of a separate complaint and be subject to all of the regulatory case processing requirements."

Part 4: The Investigation

EEO investigations are covered in 29 C.F.R. § 1614.108 and the instructions are contained in the commission's Management Directives. An efficient investigation is one that is conducted impartially with and contains an appropriate factual record. A correct factual record is one that allows a reasonable fact finder to draw conclusions as to whether discrimination occurred. "All agency employees, including the complainant, are required to cooperate with the investigation and "witness testimony is given under oath or affirmation and without a promise that the agency will keep the testimony or information provided confidential."

During this process the investigators must thoroughly investigate the complaint and are authorized to administer oaths and require witness testimony and documentation. An investigator cannot make or suggest findings of discrimination and must be free of conflicts or the appearance of conflicts of interest throughout the investigation of complaints. The evidence gathered by the investigator should only be relevant to the case in order to determine whether discrimination has occurred and if so, create the "appropriate remedy." Generally, investigations should be completed within 180 days of the filing of the individual complaint, unless the parties agree in writing to extend the period an additional 90 days.

At the end of the investigation, the agency must present the complainant with a copy of the complaint file, including the report of investigation, and the notice of the right to request either an immediate final decision from the agency or a hearing before an EEOC AJ. A complainant also may request an AJ hearing after 180 days from the filing of the complaint even if the investigation has not been completed. The complainant must receive a copy of the complaint file, plus the report of investigation (ROI), and a copy of the hearing transcript if a hearing was held.

An overview of the EEO process: Conclusion

This discussion has provided the detailed EEO process with regard to the processing of individual EEO complaints of discrimination, in accordance with 29 C.F.R. Part 1614. "The principles reflected in those procedures are also intended to guide the processing of class complaints of discrimination under 29 C.F.R. § 1614.204." The overall purpose of this discussion is to enhance the reader's understanding of the EEO process; the parts in each section of this discussion track the EEO process as chronologically as possible. However, the goal of this discussion is not to provide an exhaustive study of complex legal subjects. Digest summaries and articles themselves do not have the force of law and the reader is advised to look to the actual decisions and other sources discussed for a more precise understanding of applicable EEO law"

For a more detailed discussion of the topics addressed in this Digest, see EEOC's website at "www.eeoc.gov" regarding statutes, regulations, decisions, guidance, and directives cited in these articles.

== HR structure ==
Federal Level: The Federal classification system is not a pay plan, but is vital to the structure and administrations of employee compensation. The pay system is influenced by the grade level and by quality of performance, length of service, and recruitment and retention considerations. The law requires the Office of Personnel Management (OPM) to define Federal occupations, establish official position titles, and describe the grades of various levels of work. OPM approves and issues position classification standards that must be used by federal agencies to determine the title, series, and grade of positions.

The classification standards help assure that the Federal personnel management program runs soundly because agencies are now becoming more decentralized and now have more authority to classify positions. Agencies are required to classify positions according to the criteria and the guidance that OPM has issued. The official titles that are published in classification standards have to be used for personnel, budget, and fiscal purposes. The occupations in federal agencies may change over time, but the duties, responsibilities, and qualifications remain the same so careful application of appropriate classification of the standards needs to be related to the kind of work for the position. When classifying a position the first decision to be made is the pay system. There is the General Schedule (GS) and the Federal Wage System (FWS), which covers trade, craft, or laboring experience.

General Schedule Covers positions from grades GS−1 to GS−15 and consists of twenty two occupational groups and is divided into five categories:

Professional – Requires knowledge either acquired through training or education equivalent to a bachelor's degree or higher. It also requires the exercise of judgment, discretion and personal responsibility. Examples can be attorneys, medical officers, and biologists. Usually a person who is in the field of HR, and has gone through the education required, stays in the field for long-term career goals. People of this category are seen in the upper management of HR departments.

Administrative – Requires the exercise of analytical ability, judgment, discretion, and personal responsibility, and the application of a substantial body of knowledge of principles, concepts, and practices applicable to one or more fields of administration or management. These positions do not require specialized education, but do require skills usually gained while attaining a college level education. Examples can be budget analysts and general supply specialists. These positions will most likely be filed by career employees that act in a managerial function.

Technical – Requires extensive practical knowledge, gained through experience and specific training and these occupations may involve substantial elements of the work of the professional or administrative field. Technical employees usually carry out tasks, methods, procedures, and computations that are laid out either in published or oral instructions. Depending upon the level of difficulty of work, these procedures often require a high degree of technical skill, care, and precision. Examples of the technical category would be forestry technician, accounting technician, and pharmacy technicians.

Clerical – Involves work in support of office, business, or fiscal operations. Typically involves general office or program support duties such as preparing, receiving, reviewing, and verifying documents; processing transactions; maintaining office records; locating and compiling data or information from files. Examples can be secretaries, data transcribers, and mail clerks.

Other – There are some occupations in the General Schedule which do not clearly fit into one of the groups. Some firefighter and various law enforcement agencies have specialized positions that manage HR duties within the organization.
