= Farm Service Agency =

Agency of the US Department of Agriculture

Agency overview
- Formed: 1930; 96 years ago
- Jurisdiction: United States Department of Agriculture
- Headquarters: United States Department of Agriculture South Building 1400 Independence Avenue, S.W., Washington, D.C.; 38°53′17″N 77°1′48″W
- Employees: 10,958 (2018)
- Annual budget: US$2.035 billion (2018)
- Agency executive: William Beam, Administrator
- Website: fsa.usda.gov

The Farm Service Agency (FSA) is the United States Department of Agriculture agency that was formed by merging the farm loan portfolio and staff of the Farmers Home Administration (FmHA) and the Agricultural Stabilization and Conservation Service (ASCS). The Farm Service Agency implements agricultural policy, administers credit and loan programs, and manages conservation, commodity, disaster, and farm marketing programs through a national network of offices. The administrator of the FSA reports to the under secretary of agriculture for farm production and conservation. The FSA of each state is led by a politically appointed state executive director (SED).

== History ==
The origins of the FSA start with several earlier agencies starting in the 1930s, with several programs and agencies developed during the Great Depression. The Resettlement Administration of 1935 was an early attempt to relocate entire farming communities to more profitable locations, but this was ultimately abandoned as it proved too controversial, expensive, and showed no signs of success. In 1937, the Administration was transformed into the Farm Security Administration and switched focus to the Standard Rural Rehabilitation Loan Program, which provided credits, farm management and technical supervision to rural farmers.

Another predecessor of the FSA was the Agriculture Adjustment Act of 1933, which was intended as a program to help stabilize farm prices via price support loans to create crop reduction. The initial act was ruled unconstitutional in 1936 by United States v. Butler, but these issues were taken care of by the Agricultural Adjustment Act of 1938, passed two years later.

Following Pearl Harbor and America's entry into World War II, the War Food Administration was created to assist in the production and transportation of food for both civilian and military use. At the end of the war, the WFA was reformed into the Production and Marketing Administration.

The first attempt to consolidate the various farm agencies occurred in 1946, as the Farmers Home Administration act merged the Farm Security Administration and the Emergency Crop and Feed Loan Division of the Farm Credit Administration to form the Farmer Home Administration. The act also granted the organization the authority to ensure loans to farmers from other lenders, and later legislation established lending for rural housing, rural business enterprises, and rural water and waste disposal agencies.

The USDA reorganization of 1953 also saw changes to the FHA, including renaming it the Commodity Stabilization Service. As part of the changes, the organization began to focus on the preservation of farm income. As part of their new goals, the Commodity Stabilization Service began conservation programs such as the soil bank. The Agricultural Stabilization and Conservation Committees were also formed out of the community, county, and state committees focused on conservation. By 1961, the CCS was renamed the Agricultural Stabilization and Conservation Service, as the agency had become more focused on conservation efforts. The ASCS remained active in assisting with their previous programs and the network of field offices.

1994 saw the reorganization of the USDA, which in turn resulted in the Consolidated Farm Service Agency, Federal Crop Insurance Corporation, Farmers Home Administration, and Agriculture Stabilization and Conservation Service being merged into the modern Farm Service Agency.

Today, the committees often oversee activities in multi-county areas, due to USDA reorganization and consolidation of its field office structure into a network of about 2,500 field service centers. The committees are responsible for hiring and supervising the county executive director (CED), who manages the day-to-day activities of the field service center and its employees.

== Pigford v. Glickman ==
In the 1930s, Congress set up a unique system under which federal farm programs are administered locally; this was influenced by the powerful Southern bloc in Congress, who represented only white Democrats from their home districts. White control of this program in counties across the South deprived many black farmers of potential benefits, as blacks had been politically disenfranchised at the turn of the century.

Farmers who are eligible to participate in these programs elect a three to five-person county committee, which reviews county office operations and makes decisions on how to apply for the programs. County committees are panels of three to five farmers, elected by other farmers, to oversee the local operation of commodity programs, disaster assistance, and other programs of the Farm Service Agency. County committees, established by the Soil Conservation and Domestic Allotment Act of 1935 (P.L. 74-46), are so named because they have overseen USDA field offices for farmers that once existed in most rural farm counties throughout the United States.

In the South, black farmers were not commonly elected to county committees and were discriminated against in the administration of farm programs. A class-action lawsuit, Pigford v. Glickman, was settled in 1999 to gain compensation for African-American farmers who had been damaged by such discrimination from 1981 to 1996. USDA's own investigation had shown widespread discrimination in the programs. The USDA paid more than $2 billion to settle thousands of claims of discrimination.

== Shared Appreciation Agreement ==
A Shared Appreciation Agreement (SAA) is an agreement between the USDA and farmer borrowers, instituted when a borrower is severely delinquent on making payments on FSA real estate loans. Such an agreement allows for the forgiveness of a portion or all of the indebtedness, in return for the borrower sharing with USDA at the end of the term a portion of any appreciation in the farmer-owned real estate that served as collateral for the loan. SAAs were instituted as part of the Agricultural Credit Act of 1987 (P. L. 100-233) for the purpose of avoiding foreclosure due to the drop in land prices at that time.

== Publications ==
The majority of the Farm Service Agency’s publications are related to the various programs that are run by them. Most of these publications are brochures or other material that discuss the programs' applications and success.

== See also ==
- Agriculture Mediation Program
- Apple Market Loss Assistance Program
- Commodity Credit Corporation
- Farm Credit Administration
- Posted county price
- Title 7 of the Code of Federal Regulations
