= Commodity Credit Corporation =

U.S. government-owned corporation

The Commodity Credit Corporation (CCC) is a wholly owned United States government corporation that was created in 1933 to "stabilize, support, and protect farm income and prices" (federally chartered by the CCC Charter Act of 1948 (P.L. 80-806)). The CCC is authorized to buy, sell, lend, make payments, and engage in other activities for the purpose of increasing production, stabilizing prices, assuring adequate supplies, and facilitating the efficient marketing of agricultural commodities.

The CCC is essentially a financing institution for the USDA's farm price and income support commodity programs, commodity export credit guarantees, and agricultural export subsidies. The programs funded through CCC are administered by employees of the Farm Service Agency, the Agricultural Marketing Service, and the Foreign Agricultural Service.

The CCC has the authority to borrow up to $30 billion from the US Treasury to carry out its obligations. Net losses from its operations subsequently are restored by the Congressional appropriations process. It issues payments in the form of commodity certificates.

== History and charter ==
The CCC was incorporated on October 17, 1933, under a Delaware charter pursuant to Executive Order 6340 issued the previous day by President Franklin Delano Roosevelt. It had a capitalization of $3 million subscribed by the secretary of agriculture and the governor of the Farm Credit Administration.

It was initially managed and operated in close affiliation with the Reconstruction Finance Corporation, which funded its operations. On July 1, 1939, the CCC was transferred to the United States Department of Agriculture (USDA). The Secretary of Agriculture was granted the authority to exercise all rights of ownership of the corporation by Executive Order 8219 of 1939.

It was reincorporated on July 1, 1948, as a federal corporation within the USDA by the Commodity Credit Corporation Charter Act (62 Stat.1070; 15 U.S.C. 714).

During the 1948 presidential election campaign, Harry Truman criticized Republicans in the 80th Congress for supporting revisions to the CCC that were unpopular with farmers.

The CCC was created to stabilize, support and protect farm income and prices. The CCC is also the Federal government's primary financing arm for many domestic and international agricultural programs. The CCC helps maintain balanced and adequate supplies of agricultural commodities and aids in their orderly distribution.

The CCC helps America's agricultural producers through commodity and farm storage facility loans, purchases, and income support payments. The CCC also works to make available materials and facilities required in the production and marketing of agricultural commodities. In addition, the CCC provides incentives and payments to landowners to establish conservation practices on their land.

The CCC provides agricultural commodities to other Federal agencies and foreign governments. The CCC also donates commodities to domestic and international relief agencies as well as foreign countries. The CCC assists in the development of new domestic and foreign markets and marketing facilities for American agricultural commodities. The CCC operates numerous domestic programs such as income support, disaster, and conservation programs. It also extends direct credit and guarantees commodity sales to foreign countries throughout the world.

The CCC has its own disbursing authority and utilizes the Federal Reserve Bank system and United States Treasury to make payments. This disbursing authority allows the CCC to make payments quickly and to provide financial support to America's producers and farmers immediately. The CCC has multiple funding mechanisms. Most of the domestic programs are operated out of a revolving fund, in which the CCC has a permanent indefinite borrowing authority, as defined by Office of Management and Budget (OMB) Circular A-11, Preparation, Submission, and Execution of the Budget. Borrowing authority permits the corporation to incur obligations and authorizes it to borrow funds to liquidate the obligations. This fund also receives money from appropriated funding for costs incurred (i.e., realized losses), loan repayments, inventory sales, interest income, and fees. Additionally, the CCC receives direct appropriations for specific programs such as its Credit Reform programs, foreign grant and donation programs, and disaster relief.

The 1996 farm bill (P.L. 104-127) expanded the CCC mandate to include funding for several conservation programs (including the Conservation Reserve Program) and made conservation one of the purposes of the CCC.

More recently, in the wake of an international retaliation to what are casually known as the first Trump tariffs, the CCC was heavily invoked again. That is, In July 2018, Trump's administration announced that it would use the CCC, to pay farmers up to $12 billion. This aid was increased to $28 billion in May 2019. The CCC attempts to offset losses in the American agricultural sector resulting from retaliatory tariffs from the European Union, China, and other states. It was estimated by the USDA that in 2019 these and other aid payments constituted one third of total American farm income.

== Basic responsibilities ==
The CCC Charter Act, as amended, aids producers through loans, purchases, payments, and other operations, and makes available materials and facilities required in the production and marketing of agricultural commodities. The CCC Charter Act also authorizes the sale of agricultural commodities to other government agencies and to foreign governments and the donation of food to domestic, foreign, or international relief agencies. CCC also assists in the development of new domestic and foreign markets and marketing facilities for agricultural commodities.

The CCC funds many programs that fall under multiple agencies within the USDA. Each CCC funded program helps achieve parts of both the CCC mission and the strategic plan of the agency under which the program falls. The CCC mission and strategic goals are achieved through the successful implementation of the following key programs areas:

=== Income Support and Disaster Assistance ===
Income support and disaster assistance programs provide financial assistance to protect farmers and ranchers from fluctuations in market conditions and unexpected natural or man-made disasters. Assistance is provided through income support programs, disaster assistance programs, and the Noninsured Crop Disaster Assistance Program (NAP). FSA is responsible for administering income support and disaster assistance programs.

=== Conservation ===
Supported by the Food, Conservation, and Energy Act of 2008 (2008 Farm Bill), conservation programs offer farmers and ranchers a variety of financial and economic incentives to conserve natural resources on the nation's privately owned farmlands. These programs focus on reducing erosion, protecting streams and rivers, restoring and establishing fish and wildlife habitats, and improving air quality through several conservation incentive payments, technical assistance, and cost-share programs. FSA and NRCS administer the CCC conservation programs.

=== Commodity Operations and Food Aid ===
FSA personnel handle the procurement, acquisition, storage, disposition, and distribution of commodities, and the administration of the United States Warehouse Act (USWA). These programs help achieve domestic farm program price support objectives, produce a uniform regulatory system for storing agricultural products, and ensure the timely provision of food products for domestic and international food assistance programs and market development programs.

=== Foreign Market Development ===
Expanding markets for agricultural products is critical to the long-term health and prosperity of the U.S. agricultural sector. With 95% of the world's population not being U.S. citizens, future growth in demand for food and agricultural products will occur primarily in overseas markets. The CCC funds used in the market development programs play a critical role in helping to open new markets and in facilitating U.S. competitiveness and by doing so, help to secure a more prosperous future for American agriculture. Support for economic development and trade capacity building reinforces these efforts by helping developing countries to become economically stable and improve their prospects to participate in and benefit from expanding global trade in agricultural products. FAS administers the CCC foreign market development programs.

=== Export Credit ===
The CCC export credit guarantee and direct loan programs, administered by FAS in conjunction with FSA, provide payment guarantees for third party commercial financing and direct financing of U.S. agricultural exports. These programs facilitate exports to buyers in countries where credit is necessary to maintain or increase U.S. sales but where financing may not be available without CCC credit facilities.

== Organization ==
A board of directors manages the CCC and is subject to the general supervision and direction of the Secretary of Agriculture who is an ex officio director and chairperson of the Board. The Board consists of seven members in addition to the Secretary. The President of the United States, with the advice and consent of the Senate, appoints the board members to office. The members of the Board and the Corporation officers are officials of USDA. The CCC officers, directly or through officials of designated USDA agencies, maintain liaison with numerous other governmental and private trade operations.

The CCC has no actual employees; it carries out the majority of its programs through the personnel and facilities of the Farm Service Agency (FSA), Agricultural Marketing Service (AMS), Natural Resources Conservation Service (NRCS), Foreign Agricultural Service (FAS), and the United States Agency for International Development (USAID). Most of the CCC programs are delivered through an extensive nationwide network of FSA field offices, including approximately 2,100 USDA Service Centers and 51 state offices (including Puerto Rico). This network enables the CCC to maintain a close relationship with customers, successfully addressing their needs and continually improving program delivery. The FSA implements CCC funded programs for income support, disaster assistance, conservation, and international food procurement.

Though FSA provides the staff for the CCC, several CCC funded programs fall under purview of the FAS or the NRCS. The FAS has primary responsibility for USDA international activities - market development, trade agreements and negotiations, and the collection and analysis of statistics and market information. It also administers the USDA export credit guarantee and food aid programs and helps increase income and food availability in developing nations by mobilizing expertise for agriculturally led economic growth.

The NRCS provides leadership in a partnership effort to help American private landowners and managers conserve their soil, water, and other natural resources. It also provides financial assistance for many conservation activities. CCC reaches out to all segments of the agricultural community, including underserved and socially disadvantaged farmers and ranchers to ensure that CCC programs and services are accessible to everyone.

== See also ==
- Ever-normal granary
- Generic certificates
- Market Access Program
- Quality Samples Program
- Technical Assistance for Specialty Crops
