= Federal Agriculture Improvement and Reform Act of 1996 =

United States federal law

- Long title: An Act to modify the operation of certain agricultural programs.
- Nicknames: 1996 U.S. Farm Bill; Agricultural Market Transition Act
- Enacted by: the 104th United States Congress
- Effective: April 4, 1996

Citations
- Public law: 104–127
- Statutes at Large: 110 Stat. 888 through 110 Stat. 1197 (309 pages)

Legislative history
- Introduced in the House of Representatives as H.R. 2854 by Pat Roberts (R–KS) on January 5, 1996; Committee consideration by Agriculture, Ways and Means; Passed the House of Representatives on February 29, 1996 (270–155); Passed the Senate on March 12, 1996 (Voice vote); Reported by the joint conference committee on March 25, 1996; agreed to by the Senate on March 28, 1996 (74–26) and by the House of Representatives on March 29, 1996 (318–89); Signed into law by President Bill Clinton on April 4, 1996

The Federal Agriculture Improvement and Reform Act of 1996 (P.L. 104-127), known informally as the Freedom to Farm Act, the FAIR Act, or the 1996 U.S. Farm Bill, was the omnibus 1996 farm bill that, among other provisions, revises and simplifies direct payment programs for crops and eliminates milk price supports through direct government purchases.

The law removed the link between income support payments and farm prices. It authorized 7-year production flexibility contract payments that provided participating producers with fixed government payments independent of current farm prices and production.

The law specified the total amount of money to be made available through contract payments under production flexibility contracts for each fiscal year from 1996 through 2002. Payment levels were allocated among contract commodities according to specified percentages, generally derived from each commodity’s share of projected deficiency payments for fiscal 1996-2002.

The law increased planting flexibility by allowing participants to plant 100% of their total contract acreage to any crop, except with limitations on fruits and vegetables. The authority for acreage reduction programs was eliminated, while nonrecourse loans (with marketing loan repayment provisions) were continued in a modified form. Minimum loan rates generally were calculated each year at 85% of recent past market prices. Authority for the Farmer-Owned Reserve Program was suspended through the 2002 crop year. Authority for the honey program was eliminated.

Dairy price support was to be phased down for milk over 4 years and then eliminated, but subsequent legislation continued this program. Had dairy support ended, processors could have obtained recourse loans on dairy products. The peanut program was continued but revised to reduce the likelihood of the federal government incurring loan program costs due to loan forfeitures. The minimum national poundage quota was eliminated. The sugar program also was continued but modified. Trade and food aid programs were reoriented toward greater market development, with increased emphasis on high-value and value-added products.

Other provisions established a Commission to conduct a comprehensive review of changes to production agriculture under the 1996 Act, required USDA to conduct research on futures and options contracts through pilot programs, capped expenditures for the Export Enhancement Program, and changed the name of the Market Promotion Program to the Market Access Program.

The 1996 Act also reauthorized the Food Stamp Program for 2 years and commodity donation programs for 7 years, and established a Fund for Rural America to augment existing resources for agricultural research and rural development. Other research authorities were revised and extended, some only for 2 years rather than 7 years. The 1996 Act authorized new enrollments in the Conservation Reserve Program to maintain total acreage at up to 36,400,000 acres (147,000 km^{2}). Other conservation programs were also revised and extended. The Act also contained numerous provisions in the areas of farm credit, rural development, and generic commodity promotion through check-off programs, among others.

The 2002 farm bill (P.L. 107-171) superseded many of the 1996 farm bill provisions before they expired.

== Safe Meat and Poultry Inspection Panel ==
The Safe Meat and Poultry Inspection Panel is an advisory panel to review and evaluate meat inspection policies and proposed changes that the 1996 farm bill (P.L. 104–127, Sec. 918) permanently authorized by amendment to the federal meat and poultry inspection statutes. Provisions in annual USDA appropriations laws since 1996 have prohibited the department from actually establishing the advisory panel.

== See also ==
- Conservation Farm Option Program
- Conservation Reserve Program
- Distance Learning and Telemedicine Grant and Loan Program
- Triple base plan
- Conservation of Private Grazing Lands
