= Loan deficiency payments =

In United States agriculture policy, loan deficiency payments (LDP) are a farm income support program first authorized by the Food Security Act of 1985 (P.L. 99-198) that makes direct payments, equivalent to marketing loan gains, to producers who agree not to obtain nonrecourse loans, even though they are eligible. Loan deficiency payments are available under the 2002 farm bill (P.L. 101-171, Sec. 1205) for wheat, corn, grain sorghum, barley, oats, upland cotton, rice, soybeans, other oilseeds, wool, mohair, honey, dry peas, lentils, and small chickpeas.

Producer Option Payment (POP) is the original name for the loan deficiency payment (LDP). This phrase continues to be used by some farmers.
