= Marketing assistance loans =

Marketing assistance loans are nonrecourse loans made available to producers of loan commodities (wheat, corn, grain sorghum, barley, oats, upland and extra-long staple (ELS) cotton, rice, soybeans, other oilseeds, honey, wool, mohair, dry peas, lentils, and small chickpeas) under the 2002 farm bill (P.L. 101-171, Sec. 1201-1205). The new law largely continued the commodity loan programs as they were under previous law. Loan rate caps are specified in the law. Marketing loan repayment provisions apply when market prices drop below the loan rates. For farmers who forgo the use of marketing assistance loans, loan deficiency payment (LDP) rules apply (but not for ELS cotton).
