= Farm Security and Rural Investment Act of 2002 =

United States federal law

- Long title: An Act to provide for the continuation of agricultural programs through fiscal year 2007, and for other purposes.
- Nicknames: 2002 U.S. Farm Bill; Agricultural Act of 2001
- Enacted by: the 107th United States Congress
- Effective: May 13, 2002

Citations
- Public law: 107–171
- Statutes at Large: 116 Stat. 134 through 116 Stat. 540 (406 pages)

Legislative history
- Introduced in the House of Representatives as H.R. 2646 by Larry Combest (R-TX) on July 26, 2001; Committee consideration by Agriculture, International Relations; Passed the House of Representatives on October 5, 2001 (291–120); Passed the Senate as the Agriculture, Conservation, and Rural Enhancement Act of 2002 on February 13, 2002 (58–40); Reported by the joint conference committee on May 1, 2002; agreed to by the House of Representatives on May 2, 2002 (280–141) and by the Senate on May 8, 2002 (64–35); Signed into law by President George W. Bush on May 13, 2002

The Farm Security and Rural Investment Act of 2002, also known as the 2002 Farm Bill, includes ten titles, addressing a great variety of issues related to agriculture, ecology, energy, trade, and nutrition. This act has been superseded by the 2007 U.S. Farm Bill

The Act allocates approximately $16.5 billion annually to agricultural subsidies, These subsidies significantly influence the production of grains, oilseeds, and upland cotton Owing to its specialized scope, as well as the magnitude and timing of its provisions, the legislation was highly contentious during its passage.

Debated in the U.S. House of Representatives during the immediate aftermath of the September 11 attacks in 2001, the bill drew criticism from the White House and was nearly amended. The amendment, which failed by a close margin, was proposed by Rep. Ron Kind (D-WI) and would have shifted money away from grain subsidies to conservation measures. Public debate over the farm bill continued, and the Senate proposed sweeping amendments to the bill, leading to a series of meetings from February through April. As a result, the current farm bill was not passed until May 2002, a few weeks after the 1996 farm bill had already expired.

== Contents ==
=== Summary ===
Provisions included:

- Country-of-origin labeling for fresh beef, pork, and lamb

=== Spending tables ===
The following is the subsidies by crop in 2004 in the United States.

Commodity	US Dollars (in Millions)	Percentage of Total
Feed Grains	2,841	35.4
Wheat	1,173	14.6
Rice	1,130	14.1
Upland and ElS Cotton	1,420	17.7
Tobacco	18	0.2
Dairy	295	3.7
Soybeans and products	610	7.6
Minor Oilseeds	29	0.4
Peanuts	259	3.2
Sugar	61	0.8
Honey	3	0.0
Wool and Mohair	12	0.1
Vegetable Oil products	11	0.1
Other Crops	160	2.0
Total	8,022	100

Source USDA 2006 Fiscal Year Budget

=== Titles ===
2002 Farm Bill Titles
Title I: Commodity Programs
Title II: Conservation
Title III: Trade
Title IV: Nutrition Programs
Title V: Credit
Title VI: Rural Development
Title VII Agricultural Research
Title VIII: Forestry
Title IX: Energy
Title X: Miscellaneous

== Passage of the bill ==
"Let's push the pedal to the metal and try to get something done this year."

— Senator Ben Nelson (D-NE) after 9/11

=== Proponents of subsidy expansion ===
- Rep. Larry Combest (R-TX), chairman of the House Committee on Agriculture, drafts and sponsors initial house farm bill. His proposal would spend the equivalent of the entire federal budget surplus for FY2001, and included $76 billion in new spending on top of the previous bill's spending, for a total of $171 billion.
- Rep. Terry Everett (R-AL), owner of 400 acres (1.6 km^{2}) of peanut crops, drafted $3.5 billion peanut provision in Title I
- Sen. Tom Daschle (D-SD), Majority Leader, reassured South Dakotans that commodity subsidies would not be diminished as a result of heightened national security concerns. Credited with prioritizing the Senate version of the farm bill.

=== Shifting subsidies to conservation ===
- Rep. Ron Kind (D-WI) brought an amendment to shift $19 billion from commodities (Title I) to conservation (Title II) (amendment fails 10/4/2001, 200–226)
  - Kind planned to re-introduce the content of his failed amendment in the next farm bill, with the Healthy Farms and Forests Act of 2006.
- Rep. Sherwood Boehlert (R-NY) co-sponsored the Kind amendment. He looked to Florida fruit and vegetable growers for support, because they received no subsidies in 2001. "The inability to persuade more Florida members to vote yes was a key to its defeat."
- Rep. Wayne T. Gilchrest (R-MD) also co-sponsored the Kind amendment.
- Rep. Leonard Boswell (D-IA) brought an amendment to put $650 million into renewable energy, which failed (10/3/2001)
- Sen. Tom Harkin (D-IA), senior Democrat on the Senate Committee on Agriculture, revised the House bill (H.R.2646) for passage in the Senate. After the passage of the House version, he told reporters about his ideas for "green" payments rewarding conservation methods.
- Rep. Gil Gutknecht (R-MN) spoke for many legislators who complained that this was a "farm bill not an environmental bill" (10/4)

=== Subsidy caps ===
The largest difference between the House bill and its Senate counterpart was that the total amount of subsidies received by an individual farmer was capped by the Senate. Voicing concerns that "millionaire farmers" were reaping all the benefits of the farm bill legislation, a coalition of farm-state Senators pushed for these limits.

- Sen. Charles Grassley (R-IA) was vehement about lowering subsidy caps from $500,000 to $225,000 "we don't want 10 percent of the farmers getting 60 percent of the farm bill."
- Sen. Byron Dorgan (D-ND) cosponsored the subsidy cap amendment.
- Sen. Ben Nelson (D-NE) supported subsidy caps "I believe, along with most Nebraskans, that our farm program should discourage consolidation in agriculture... These enormous payments do exactly the opposite."
- Sen. Blanche Lincoln (D-AR) and Sen. Thad Cochran (R-MS) opposed capping subsidies. Lincoln was the only Democrat in opposition. Cochran said the caps would be "catastrophic for southern farm interests"

=== Opposing overproduction ===
After September 11, the farm bill was considered problematic for three reasons. First, it would neither receive nor deserve the careful attention necessary during the aftermath of the terrorist attacks. Second, its expenditures would consume the entire budget surplus, money that could be necessary for the American invasion of Afghanistan. Finally, Secretary of Agriculture Ann Veneman opposed the new farm bill. On September 19, her office issued a report criticizing traditional agricultural policies and calling for a shift from subsidies to conservation. According to her assessments, commodity subsidies would lead to overproduction and expensive land. Her position was supported by various other groups and legislators.

- The White House Office of Management and Budget issued a formal manifesto (10/3) opposing the initial farm bill, calling it expensive and unresponsive to changes in agriculture.
- Sen. Richard Lugar (R-IN), a farmer with a modest operation, was outraged that the farm bill remained on Congressional agendas after the terrorist attacks. (Omaha Herald 9/27/01)
  - Agreeing with Secretary Veneman and the White House, he argued that the farm bill causes overproduction so bad "we've got it coming out of our ears."
  - Proposed 6 percent payment to cover premium on crop insurance instead of guaranteeing income. (1/21)
- Sen. Chuck Hagel (R-NE) and Rep. Earl Pomeroy (D-ND) also opposed the revised bill, concerned that it will continue to subsidize overproduction.

=== Eggplant Caucus ===
With mounting opposition from both sides of the aisle, the fate of the farm bill was unclear in early 2002. Anxious farmers were frustrated by the gridlocked Senate, which had promised a quick resolution to the impending expiration of the previous bill. The emergence of the Eggplant Caucus, so named for a major New Jersey crop, was a major factor in the passage of the bill.

Sen. Patrick Leahy (D-VT) saw the opportunity for what he considered to be a more fair and equitable farm bill, and sought to unite over 20 senators from states with less powerful farming interests in support of subsidies for specialty crops and conservation. Active members of the Eggplant Caucus included Senators Hillary Clinton, Charles E. Schumer, and Harry Reid.

== Timeline ==
=== The House of Representatives ===
September 10, 2001: $171 billion, 10-year farm bill (with $73 billion in new spending) reported out of committee, to be considered by the full House of Representatives.

September 11: September 11, 2001 attacks

September 19: Secretary of Agriculture Ann Veneman criticizes traditional farm policy, calls for a shift from commodity subsidies to conservation measures

September 27: Secretary Veneman criticizes the new bill as expensive in post-9/11 budget, claims it will lead to overproduction and expensive land.

October 2: Rep. Ron Kind (D-WI) introduces an amendment to shift $19 billion (approx. 15%) of commodity subsidies to conservation measures.

October 2: Rep. Larry Combest (R-TX), farm bill sponsor, threatens to pull the bill if it is amended.

October 3: Rep. Leonard Boswell (D-IA), proposes shifting $650 million to ethanol, amendment fails.

October 4: Kind amendment falls 26 votes short, fails.

October 5: 10 year, $73 billion farm bill increase passes in the House of Representatives.

Source: (H.R.2646)

=== The Senate ===
October 24: Senators Ben Nelson (D-NE) and Tom Harkin (D-IA) reject Sec. Veneman's request that the Senate delay consideration of the farm bill to focus on war effort.

December 14: Sen. Patrick Leahy (D-VT) and his Eggplant Caucus add dramatic increases in conservation spending ($21.3 billion). Co-sponsors Nelson and Harkin cut the House version in half (5 year life, $45 billion in new spending).

January 17, 2002: Spurred by a website listing absentee landlords of huge farms, Sen. Chuck Grassley (R-IA) supports an amendment to cap subsidy payments at $225,000. Amendment passes, shifting $1.3 billion to programs for beginning farmers.

February 14: Senate passes a 5-year version of the bill, with a $45 billion spending increase, by a 58:40 vote.

Source: (S. 1731)

=== Reconciling the bills ===
March 19: After two weeks of closed door negotiations, House agrees to $17 billion for conservation.

April 19: House passes non-binding resolution capping subsidies at $275,000 per farm (a $50,000 increase from the Senate bill).

April 26: Final version agreed upon: $360,000 subsidy cap, $17.1 billion for conservation. Expected to cost a total of $190 billion over ten years, an increase of over $90 billion (expires in September, 2007, six years later)

May 13: The Farm Security and Rural Investment Act of 2002 signed into law by President Bush.

== Criticism ==
Critics of U.S. agricultural policy claim that it may be in violation of World Trade Organization agreements, asserting that domestic subsidies may be considered to be a non-tariff trade barrier. Others, including the Cato Institute's Center for Trade Policy Studies, the Union of Concerned Scientists, the Iowa Corn Growers Association, and Oxfam America, argue that subsidizing domestic grains leads to overproduction that is harmful both for farmers and for the general public. They claim that subsidies depress market prices while increasing land values. Many farmers do not own their land, and as a result, the subsidies they receive are capitalized into the value of the land they farm, and therefore provide little benefit to the farmers themselves.

Author Michael Pollan's book, The Omnivore's Dilemma suggests that corn subsidies in particular have led to the success of the feedlots or concentrated animal feeding operation (CAFOs) that he and journalist Eric Schlosser have blamed for the emergence of e. coli as a major health concern. Subsidized corn is so inexpensive that beef companies find it profitable to build large facilities to feed corn to their cattle. Cows do not normally live in enclosed areas or consume corn, so these CAFOs generate large amounts of waste and require antibiotics and other drugs to keep the animals healthy.

Others have criticised the balance of subsidies on nutritional grounds, saying that oilseed crops (used to make vegetable oil) and corn should be subsidized less (because it can be made into high fructose corn syrup) and that fruits and vegetables should be subsidized more.

The act's expansion of food stamp eligibility to non-citizens has also been criticized.

== See also ==
- Biotechnology and Agricultural Trade Program
- Butter-Powder Tilt
- Community Fire Protection Program
- Conservation Reserve Program
- Conservation Security Program
- Desert Terminal Lakes Program
- Distance Learning and Telemedicine Grant and Loan Program
- Exporter Assistance Initiative
- Partnerships and Cooperation Program
- Resource Management System
- Rural Strategic Investment Program
- Triple base plan
- Technical Assistance for Specialty Crops
- Conservation of Private Grazing Lands
