= Soil Erosion Service =

New Deal land agency

The Soil Erosion Service (SES) was founded in 1933 and was one of many Alphabet agencies, also called New Deal agencies. Soil Erosion Service was a U.S. federal government agency created by inder the Soil Conservation Act enacted on April 27, 1935. Soil Erosion Service was created to combat the Dust Bowl and the Great Depression. The Soil Erosion Service later became the Soil Conservation Service (SCS), and then the Natural Resources Conservation Service (NRCS).

== History ==
The National Industrial Recovery Act of 1933 included funds to fight soil erosion. Causes of the dust bowl included concentrated agriculture practiced by so-called sodbusters (farmers who replaced fields of native grasses with wheat and other crops). Some of the grassland was previously used for livestock. Most sodbuster activity came between 1905 and 1915. By the 1920s rainfall had decreased and crops failed. The soil turned to dust and formed the black blizzards of the Great Plains for about 10 years. Soil Erosion Service became a service under the Department of the Interior in 1933. Hugh Hammond Bennett served as SES' first chief, serving until 1951. SES was transferred to the Department of Agriculture in 1935. SES activities included educating landowners on how to farm land with severe erosion. SES also created demonstration projects showing best practices. Some of the labor for the demonstration projects was provided by the Civilian Conservation Corps (CCC), the Civil Works Administration (CWA), and the Works Progress Administration (WPA). After the Flood Control Act of 1936, SES added watershed management projects. SES worked with tree nurseries to supply saplings and seeds. SES conducted soil control and conservation projects to combat erosion on government lands. SES initiated aerial photography programs to help in conservation and agricultural projects. SES also worked with the Agricultural Conservation Program. In 1952, US Soil Survey merged with SES.

== Gallery ==
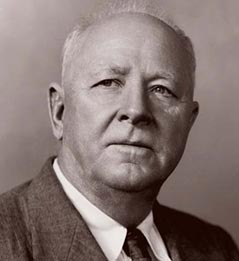
Hugh Hammond Bennett served as the first chief of the Soil Erosion Service till 1951

US Nation's First Watershed Project by the Soil Erosion Service. From left to right, John Bollinger, a farmer and planner with the Soil Conservation Service, Dr. Hugh Bennett, retired chief of the U.S. Soil Conservation Service, Marvin Schweers, Wisconsin state conservationist, and Herbert Flueck, Minnesota state conservationist, photo take July 19, 1955.

Chief Hugh H. Bennett, Mrs. Bennett, and regional conservator A.E. McClymonds view conservation work on the Frank Milsna farm, Manske Ridge on the Coon Creek Demonstration Project in Vernon County, Wisconsin, on October 25, 1946

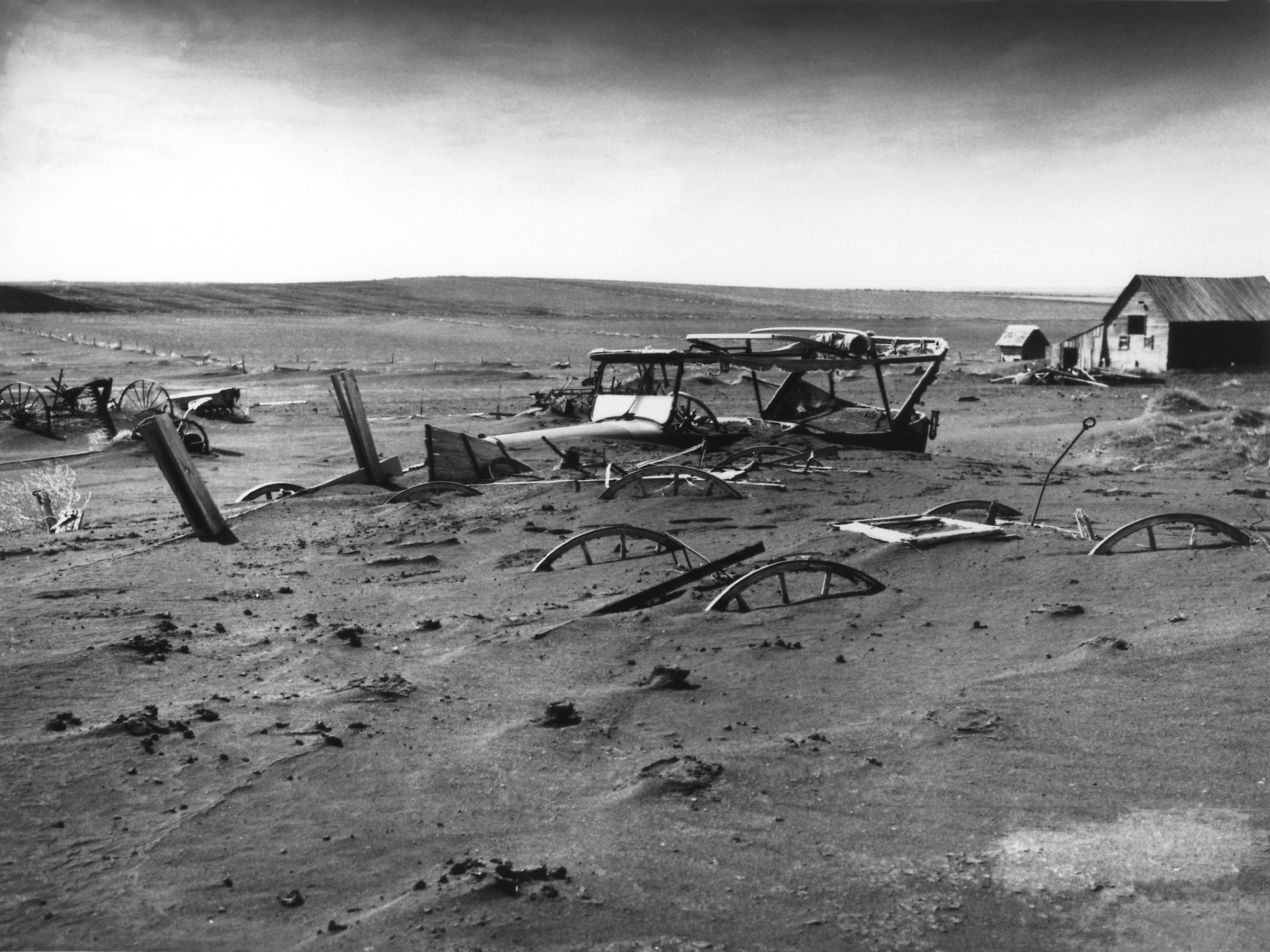
Dust Bowl in Dallas, South Dakota in 1936 with buried farm machinery

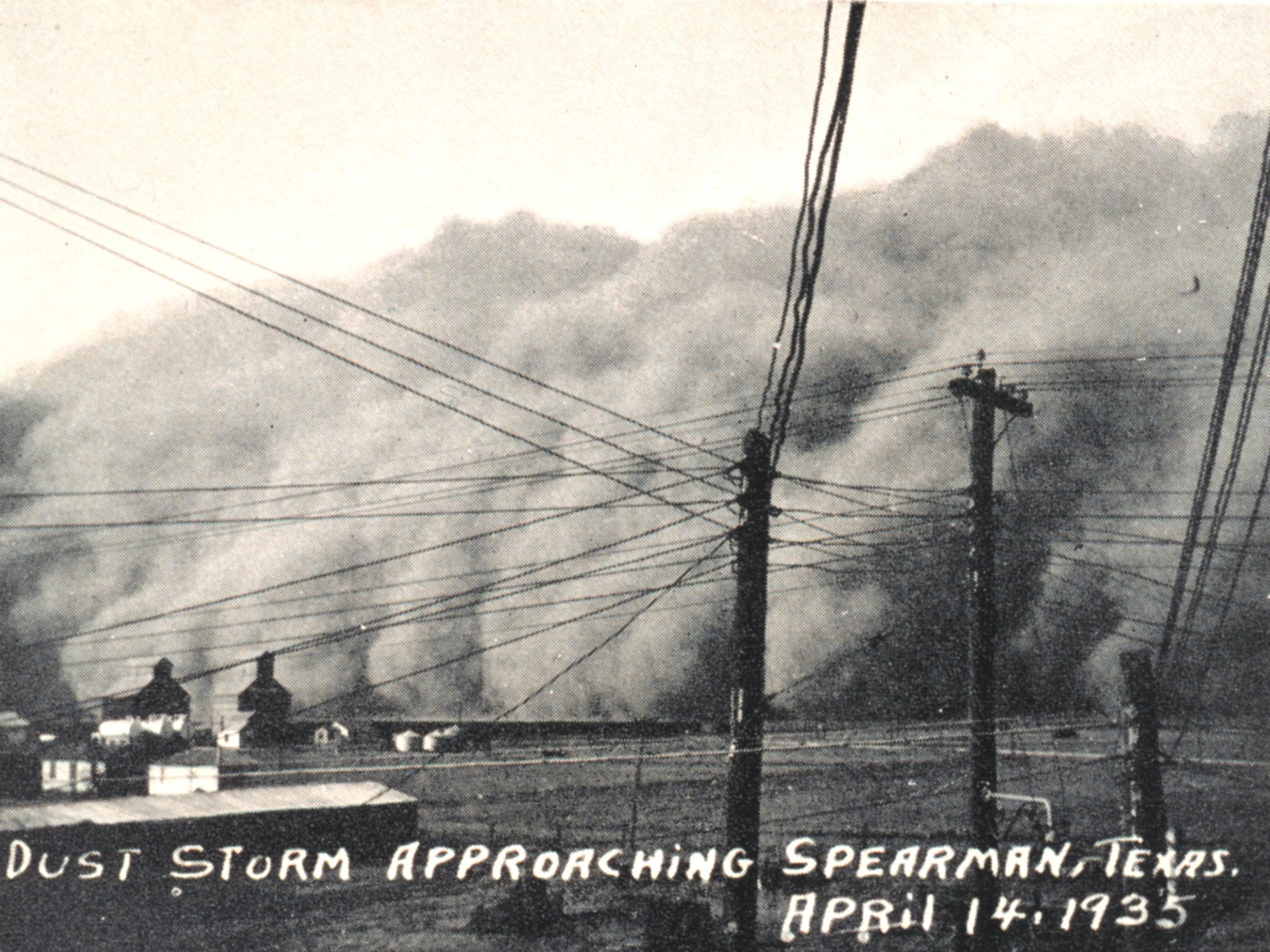
Dust storm in Spearman, Texas in

== See also ==
- Great Plains Shelterbelt
- National Cooperative Soil Survey
- Great Plains Conservation Program
- Howard Finnell
- A. Starker Leopold
- National Cooperative Soil Survey
- Land Utilization Program
