= Hugh Hammond Bennett =

American soil scientist

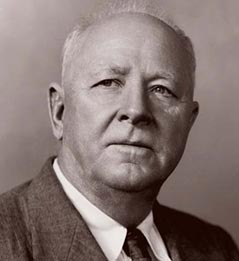
Hugh Hammond Bennett

Hugh Hammond Bennett (April 15, 1881 – July 7, 1960) was a pioneer in the field of soil conservation in the United States of America. He was the head of the Soil Erosion Service, a federal agency now referred to as the Natural Resources Conservation Service.

Bennett was born near Wadesboro in Anson County, North Carolina and graduated from the University of North Carolina in 1903. Immediately upon graduation, he became a soil surveyor, and conducted soil studies, both in the United States and in other countries, that eventually convinced him that soil erosion was a serious problem facing the planet.

== Conservationism ==
In 1905 at Louisa County, Virginia employed in a soil survey for the U.S. Department of Agriculture, the subject first realized the link between soil quality and erosion. By the 1920s, Bennett was actively writing about soil erosion for popular magazines and scientific journals, with works appearing in publications like Country Gentleman and Scientific Monthly. He found his opinions opposed by some colleagues, a supervisor stating, "The soil is the one indestructible ... asset the nation possesses ... It is the one resource that cannot be exhausted."

He co-wrote a United States Department of Agriculture publication in 1928 titled Soil Erosion: A National Menace, which was regarded as his most influential work and garnered the attention of Representative James P. Buchanan of Texas. Buchanan, who was a member of the United States House Committee on Appropriations, helped obtain funding in 1929 for soil erosion studies in the United States. Bennett was also instrumental in the formation of the Soil Conservation Society of America (now the Soil and Water Conservation Society).

== Government service ==
When the Soil Erosion Service was established as part of the United States Department of the Interior in September 1933, Bennett became the director. He continued to speak out on soil conservation issues, especially through the Dust Bowl years, and eventually influenced the passage of the soil conservation act of April 27, 1935, which created the Soil Conservation Service at the USDA. He remained at the head of that organization until he retired in 1951.

Hammond hired Henry Howard Finnell to put his soil expertise to work:

Hugh Hammond Bennett, the head of the Soil Conservation Service, put Finnell in charge of Region Six, the hardest-hit area of the country; code name: "Operation Dustbowl." Finnell set up shop north of Dalhart. Areas where the soil was not suitable for cultivation were turned back to grassland. Thirteen other demonstration projects, manned by CCC and WPA workers, put Finnell's moisture-conserving ideas to the test, with great success. By May of 1936, nearly 40,000 farmers had joined him, and 5.5 million acres were under new terraced and contour-listed cultivation. At the end of 1937, despite the persistent dust storms, the amount of dangerously eroded land had been reduced by more than half.

Hammond's efforts changed the mindset of American farmers toward soil conservation, and as director of the Soil Conservation Service, he helped them learn new ways of cultivation that protected the soil and preserved fertility. The creation of the Soil Conservation Service and its inclusion in the United States Department of Agriculture also marked the US government's acceptance and establishment of the interpretation of soils for soil and water conservation. As director of the SCS, Bennett launched a campaign for soil conservation toward educating the public and politicians by identifying areas in the Dust Bowl where the combination of geographic and agricultural systems caused the most serious erosion.

Largely in response to Bennett's campaign for soil conservation, Representative James P. Buchanan of Texas attached an amendment to the 1930 appropriations bill authorizing the USDA to establish a series of soil erosion experiment stations. The Coon Creek Watershed Project, in southwestern Wisconsin, was the first of many watershed-based projects initiated to demonstrate soil conservation practices to farmers. The locations for these stations were selected by Bennett, and involved teams of researchers establishing plots to measure erosion conditions under various types of crops, soils, rotations, and their responses to different agricultural managements practices and structures.

== Recognition ==
Bennett received many awards and honors for his work during his lifetime, including:

- President of the Association of American Geographers in 1943
- The Frances K. Hutchinson Medal from the Garden Club of America in 1944
- The Cullum Geographical Medal by the American Geographical Society in 1948
- The Distinguished Service Medal by the USDA in 1947
- The Audubon Medal by the National Audubon Society in 1947
- A fellow of the American Society of Agronomy in 1947

In 2000, Bennett was named a charter inductee into the USDA Hall of Heroes. During his lifetime, Bennett received many honors, including serving as president of the Association of American Geographers in 1943, receiving the Frances K. Hutchinson Award from the Garden Club of America in 1944, the Cullum Geographical Medal by the American Geographical Society in 1948, and the Distinguished Service Medal by the USDA and the Audubon Medal by the National Audubon Society, both in 1947. He was a fellow of the American Society of Agronomy, the American Geographical Society, the American Association for the Advancement of Science, and the Soil Conservation Society of America. He is buried in Arlington National Cemetery.
