= Water Quality Initiative =

The Water Quality Initiative is a multi-agency effort, initiated by USDA in 1990, to determine relationships between agricultural activities and water quality, and develop and implement strategies that protect surface and groundwater quality. This program, which builds on earlier USDA water quality protection efforts, includes research activities, projects involving landowners, and information and data development. Landowners participate in demonstration projects, hydrologic unit area projects, water quality special projects, and water quality incentive projects.
