= Milton A. Abernethy =

American journalist and magazine editor (1911–1991)

Milton Avant Abernathy (February 24, 1911 – April 21, 1991) was an American journalist, magazine editor, business owner, and stockbroker, best known for his time spent editing the literary journal Contempo: A Review of Books and Personalities from 1931–1934.

== Radical journalism ==
The Waynesville, North Carolina native first rose to fame writing for the student journal Wataugan, a publication of North Carolina State University. His articles soon gave him his first reputation as a smalltime radical, as he spoke out in a number of articles. These include "Whither the South? Light on the Southern Industrial Revolution" attacked Northern Capitalists who came south to exploit Southern Labor, and “Militarism or Education—which?” attacked his school's compulsory military training. He soon struck a little too far with "The Game of Cheating at North Carolina State College is Not Equal to Any Other Sport," an article that outlined the cheating endemic at the university. Predictably, it was the Student Council that came down hard on him, finding him guilty and expelling him. Abernethy won the case on appeal with the help of faculty, but soon transferred to the University of North Carolina at Chapel Hill, a move that proved quite important to his future life.

== Contempo years (1931–1934) ==
Soon after transferring to UNC-Chapel Hill, Abernethy joined with several other college students (Phil Liskin, Shirley Carter, Vincent Garoffolo, and Anthony Buttitta) to start a literary magazine known as Contempo. The magazine started as a small publication accepting free submissions. It would eventually publish many of the major authors of the day, including Sherwood Anderson, Ezra Pound, Langston Hughes, William Faulkner, William Carlos Williams, Hart Crane, James Joyce, and others.

Abernethy co-edited the magazine with Anthony Buttitta (following the departure of the other three editors by the fall of 1931), and Minna K. Abernethy (his wife, and co-editor following Buttitta's departure). It is likely that Abernethy did a lot of the administrative work for the magazine, as he is said to have been the one to contact authors and bartered for ads at the magazine's beginning and may have dealt with the financial aspects of the magazine. The editing process itself, though accounts from those associated with the magazine vary, may have been the combined work of both Buttitta and Abernethy, or for a short time, Abernethy, Buttitta, and Minna.

Abernethy met a number of literary figures during his time at the magazine, including Langston Hughes during his visit to Chapel Hill—but his major literary connection with the magazine was with Faulkner. Abernethy met him at a Southern Writers Conference in Charlottesville, Virginia, and eventually accompanied him on a drive to New York City with his professor Paul Green. After an eventful trip, the group arrived and Faulkner was immediately set upon by publishers trying to sign him (due to the success of his novel Sanctuary, and the possible folding of his current publisher). To help him escape, Abernethy accompanied Faulkner on a trip to the South. This trip provided quite a boon for Contempo, as Abernethy invited the author to stay with Buttitta and him in Chapel Hill. This led to Faulkner allowing them access to his rejected manuscripts.

The magazine would continue to run through 1934. In 1933, Abernethy became involved in a feud with his former co-editor, Buttitta. This feud, possibly started by the inclusion of Abernethy's wife as an editor, involved Buttitta setting up a rival Contempo in the nearby city of Durham, North Carolina. Abernethy defended the "true" Contempo in a series of printed statements in the magazine.

== Early business ventures (1931–1953) ==
Abernethy also founded or co-founded a bookstore known as the Intimate Bookshop in 1931. The bookstore, which developed in tandem with the magazine, and served as its headquarters, would outlast both Contempo and Abernethy's ownership.

Initially an operation run out of his college dorm room, the bookshop moved to a second floor location in the Tankersly Building in Chapel Hill, and eventually to the Patterson Building on July 25, 1932. The bookstore was supposedly started using a combination of Abernethy's collection of avant-garde books and review-books used for the magazine. Abernethy may have had other eccentric methods of collecting books. Stories exist of Abernethy, whose mission was to sell everything from the “Manifesto to the Bible,” possibly buying 10,000 copies of the Communist Manifesto and selling them for 10 cents each. Other accounts have him picking books used textbooks out of trashcans at the end of the semester.

Abernethy supposedly had a number of eccentric policies. He would allow people to stay in the bookstore all night, simply locking them inside the building when he left. He was also known to loan books, to buy books back after people had read them, and supposedly, to keep records on the bathroom wall.

Minna Abernethy ran the Intimate Bookshop for a brief period when Abernethy served in the military from 1943–1946. The Intimate Bookshop was the first of a number of small businesses with which Abernethy was associated. He would sell office supplies, typewriters, and records through the Intimate Bookshop, and may have started selling furniture as well. By the late 1930s, had grown successful enough to buy the Patterson building (the second building to house the Intimate Bookshop) for $4700.

== Accused of communist activity (June–September 1953) ==
Abernethy's association with leftwing causes dates back to at least his time writing for the student journal at North Carolina State University. Contempo would oftentimes feature left-leaning reviews, articles, and literature, further suggesting his association with leftwing ideas. Abernethy would eventually be accused of Communist activities in the 1950s. Initial response in the town was negative, though he would later receive quite a bit of support from locals who defended him. One supporter claimed no one took his Communism seriously.

It is certain that Abernethy had some level of communist involvement. Besides his association with the left-leaning Contempo magazine, Abernethy also made a trip to the Soviet Union in 1935. There is the possibility that he ran a press in the back of the Intimate Bookshop. These activities and this press would eventually get Abernethy in trouble in the 1950s. Abernethy was accused by Paul Crouch, a district manager for the Communist Party in North and South Carolina. At this time, this press came under particular scrutiny. It may have been used to print communist literature; it may have also been a broken down press that barely worked, or it could have been used to print American Federation of Labor handbills so Abernethy could earn some extra money. The press was widely considered to be an “underground” press in the newspapers of the day, though one supporter pointed out that there would have been no reason to keep it a secret in the 1930s.

The accusations initially caused the Abernethy's a lot of grief. They withdrew their children from the local schools, sending one to a school in Chicago; and they eventually sold their businesses and left town in 1955.

== Final business ventures and death (1953–1991) ==
Abernethy was quite successful following his departure from Chapel Hill. He moved to New York City, and eventually became a successful stockbroker, a job that allowed him to have a residence on Riverside Drive, and to spend his summers in Hampton Bays, New York, on Long Island. He also owned a lot of valuable property in Chapel Hill. He died in 1991 in Hampton Bays; his ashes were spread at his daughter and grandson's house off Jones Ferry Road in Chapel Hill.
