= Conservation Effects Assessment Project =

United States government project

The Conservation Effects Assessment Project (CEAP) was established in 2002 to quantify the environmental impact of the United States Department of Agriculture's (USDA) conservation program. The project focuses on how watersheds are affected. CEAP monitored 14 benchmark watershed sites. The CEAP's vision is to enhance "natural resources and healthier ecosystems through improved conservation effectiveness and better management of agricultural landscapes". The goal is "to improve efficacy of conservations practices and programs by quantifying conservation effects and providing the science and education base needed to enrich conservation planning, implementation, management decisions, and policy".

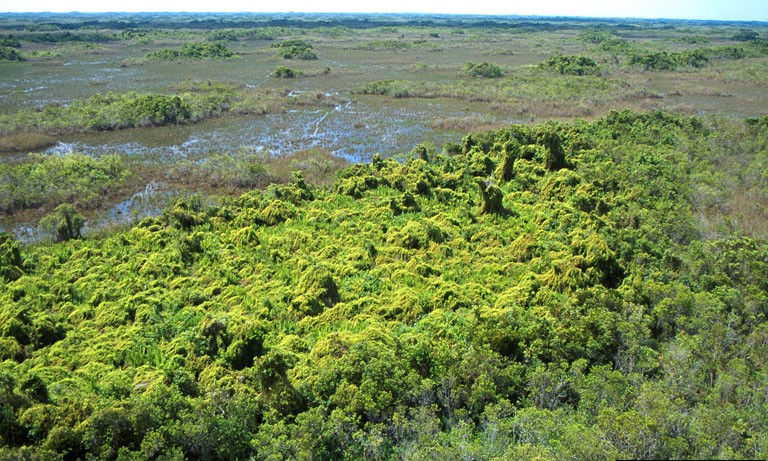
A conserved watershed in the United States

== Soil Water Assessment Tool ==
The Soil Water Assessment Tool (SWAT) is supported by the USDA Agricultural Research Service. It is a river basin scale model used to quantify the impact of land management practices in large watersheds. This tool is located in Grassland, Soil and Research Laboratory in Temple, Texas.

== Sustaining the Earth's Watersheds-Agricultural Research Data System ==
Sustaining the Earth's Watershed-Agricultural Research Data Systems (STEWARDS) was created by a group called the Watershed Assessment Studies a team within the CEAP. STEWARDS is a system that consists of a database to allow users to search and analyze various watershed conditions. The anticipated benefits include data preservation, faster data access, and improved ability to collaborate research between watersheds.

== Watersheds affected ==
- Mahantango Creek Experimental Watershed in Pennsylvania
- Reynolds Creek Experimental Watershed in Idaho
- Little River Experimental Watershed in Georgia
- Little Washita River Experimental Watershed in Oklahoma
- Walnut Gulch Experimental Watershed in Arizona

== Partnerships ==
Lead USDA agencies

- Natural Resources Conservation Services (NRCS) which works to reduce soil erosion while also enhancing water supplies and improving water quality.
- Agricultural Research Service which is the United States Department of Agriculture (USDA)'s research department.
- National Institute of Food and Agriculture another section of the USDA.
- Farm Service Agency(FSA), a government agency that equal serves farmers, ranchers and agricultural partners through agricultural programs that benefit all Americans.
- U.S. Geological Survey (USGS)is an impartial science organization that provides the public with information on the ecosystems and environment.
- United States Fish and Wildlife Service a bureau within the Department of the Interior their goal is to conserve and enhance fish, wildlife, and plants.
- USDA Economic Research Service (ERS) is the primary source for economic information and research within the USDA.
- USDA Forest Service manages national forests and public grasslands.
- U.S. Environmental Protection Agency (EPA)'s mission is to protect the environment as well as human health. They ensure that federal laws to ensure human and environmental health are implemented and enforced.
- U.S. Bureau of Land Management (BLM), makes sure that the water in the watersheds is clean and that there is an adequate supply.
- National Oceanic and Atmospheric Administration (NOAA), focuses on the conditions of the oceans and the atmosphere, it is a federal agency.

Additional partners

- International Association of Fish and Wildlife Agencies is the point place for state fish and wildlife agencies. The represent the state agencies on Capitol Hill on important conservation and management policies.
- Soil and Water Conservation Society (SWCS) is a nonprofit scientific and educational organization. They advocate for science-based practice, programs, and policy and conservation professionals.
- The Nature Conservancy protects the land and water in order to preserve the plants, animals, and natural communities.
- The Wildlife Society addresses national and international issues that effect current and future North American wildlife. The society is made up of professional wildlife conservationists.
- Land-grant colleges and universities
