= Eveline M. Burns =

American economist

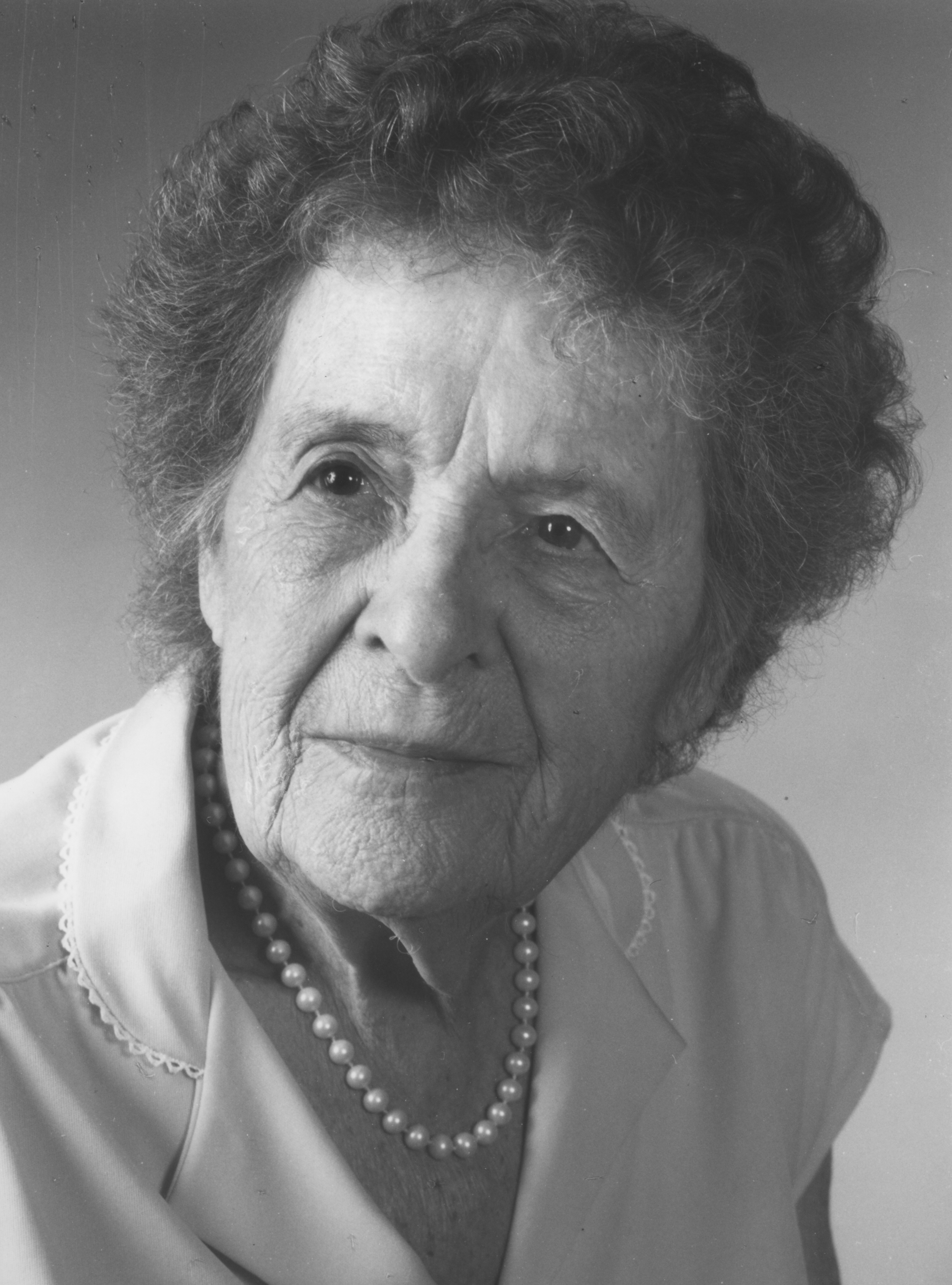
Eveline M. Burns, 1983

Eveline Mabel Richardson Burns (March 16, 1900 – September 2, 1985) was an American economist, writer and instructor.

== Early life and education ==
Born Eveline Mabel Richardson in London, England, she was the only child of Eveline Maud Falkner and Frederick Haig Richardson. Her mother died following her birth, so her father remarried and had three more children. Eveline attended Seatham Secondary School, then entered the London School of Economics at age 16 and graduated in 1920, earning a B.S. with first class honors. After the award of her Ph.D. in 1926, she gained a Laura Spelman Rockefeller Fellowship.

== Career ==
She became professor of Social Work at Columbia University in 1928. In 1933, during the Great Depression, she returned to England in 1933 to study unemployment programs. In 1934, as a member of President Franklin D. Roosevelt's Committee on Economic Security, she helped design the US Social Security Act of 1935. During the following years she served with the American Association for Social Security, the Social Welfare Committee of the YWCA and the executive board of the Women's Club of New York. From 1939 to 1943 she was head of the economic security and health section of the National Resources Planning Board. In the 1940s, she was the Anna Shaw Lecturer at Bryn Mawr College and a professor at Columbia.

From 1953 to 1954, she was vice-president and president of the American Economic Association. Between 1950 and 1958, she held various posts in the National Conference on Social Welfare.

During her career, she published multiple works on social welfare.

== Personal life and death ==
In 1922, she married the economist Arthur Robert Burns and the couple emigrated to the United States. She and her husband traveled the country for two years while writing The Economic World.

She died at St. Mary's Hospital in Newton, Pennsylvania. Arthur and Eveline did not have any children.

== Awards and honors ==
In 1954, she was awarded the Adam Smith Medal for outstanding economic research. The same year she received a Guggenheim Fellowship. In 1968, she was given the Blanche Ittelson Award.

== Selected works ==
- The American Social Security System, 1949
- Private and social insurance and the problem of social security, Canadian Welfare Association, 1953.
- Social Security and Public Policy, 1956.
- Toward Social Security: An Explanation of the Social Security Act and a Survey of the Larger Issues, 1936
- Wages and the state: a comparative study of the problems of state wage regulation, P. S. King, 1926.
