= William Remington =

Accused American spy and convicted perjurer (1917–1954)

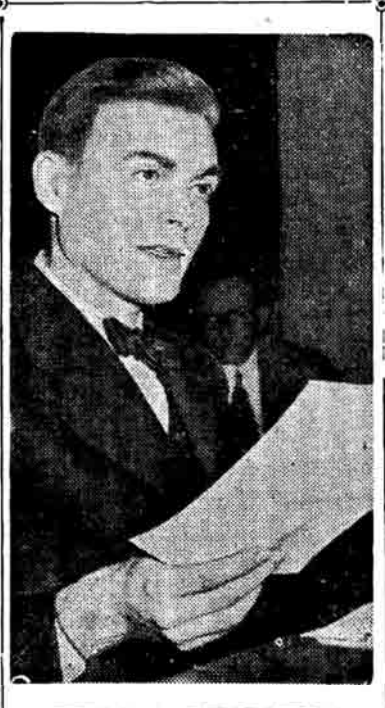
- Remington testifying before a Senate committee in 1948
- Born: William Walter Remington; October 25, 1917; New York City, New York, U.S.
- Died: November 24, 1954 (aged 37); USP Lewisburg, Lewisburg, Pennsylvania, U.S.
- Cause of death: Murder
- Education: Dartmouth College (1939); Columbia University (1940)
- Employer(s): Tennessee Valley Authority (1936–1937); National Resources Planning Board (1940-1941); Council of Economic Advisers (1947–1948)
- Spouses: Ann Moos; Jane Alben
- Parent(s): Lillian Maude Sutherland (1888–1969); Frederick C. Remington (1870–1956)

William Walter Remington (October 25, 1917 – November 24, 1954) was an American economist who was employed in various United States government positions. His career was interrupted by accusations of communist espionage made by Elizabeth Bentley, a Soviet spy and defector.

Remington was tried twice and convicted twice. The first conviction was set aside on legal grounds, but the second conviction, in 1953 on two counts of perjury, was upheld. He was sentenced to three years in federal prison. In November 1954, he was murdered in his cell by fellow inmates at Lewisburg Prison.

== Background ==
William Walter Remington was born on October 25, 1917, in New York City. He was raised in Ridgewood, New Jersey, by parents Lillian Maude Sutherland (1888-1969) and Frederick C. Remington (1870–1956). His father worked for the Metropolitan Life Insurance Co.; his mother was an art teacher in New York.

Remington distinguished himself in school. He was admitted to Dartmouth College at age 16, graduating Phi Beta Kappa and magna cum laude in 1939. He then earned a Master's degree from Columbia University in 1940. Coming from a branch of the wealthy Remington family (from Ilion, New York in the Mohawk Valley), Remington's parents were demanding.

The son developed a somewhat unconventional and flamboyant personality. From an early age, he was drawn to radical leftist politics, and declared to his friends when he was 15 that he was a communist. During the Depression, numerous intellectuals were drawn to communism. In college, he befriended members of the Young Communist League (YCL) and Communist Party of the United States (CPUSA). In subsequent trial testimony, Remington stated that while he was a Republican when he entered college, he "moved left quite rapidly" and became a radical but was never a YCL or CPUSA member at Dartmouth. Whether Remington ever officially joined these communist organizations became a key point of contention in his legal battles.

== Career ==
After obtaining his Master's degree in economics, Remington was employed in a number of federal civil service posts, principally as an economist:

- Tennessee Valley Authority, Knoxville, Tennessee, September 1936 to May 1937
- Workers Education Committee, Knoxville, April to August 1937
- Junior Economist with the National Resources Planning Board, Washington, D.C., May 1940 to July 15, 1941
- Associate industrial economist in the Office of Price Administration of the Office for Emergency Management, from July 1941 to February 1942;
- Assistant to the Director of the War Production Board, February 1942 to October 1943
- Assistant to the Director of Orders and Regulations Bureau in the War Production Board, October 1943 to 1946
- President's Council of Economic Advisers, March 1947 to March 1948

For his position with the Office of Price Administration, Remington was required to undergo a loyalty-security check, which began in 1941. He admitted having been active in Communist-allied groups such as the American Peace Mobilization, but denied any sympathy with communism and swore under oath that he was not and had never been a member of the Communist Party. Although his leftist affiliations raised concerns, the inquiry was somewhat superficial in nature (despite dragging out for many months), and his security clearance was approved.

== Alleged espionage ==
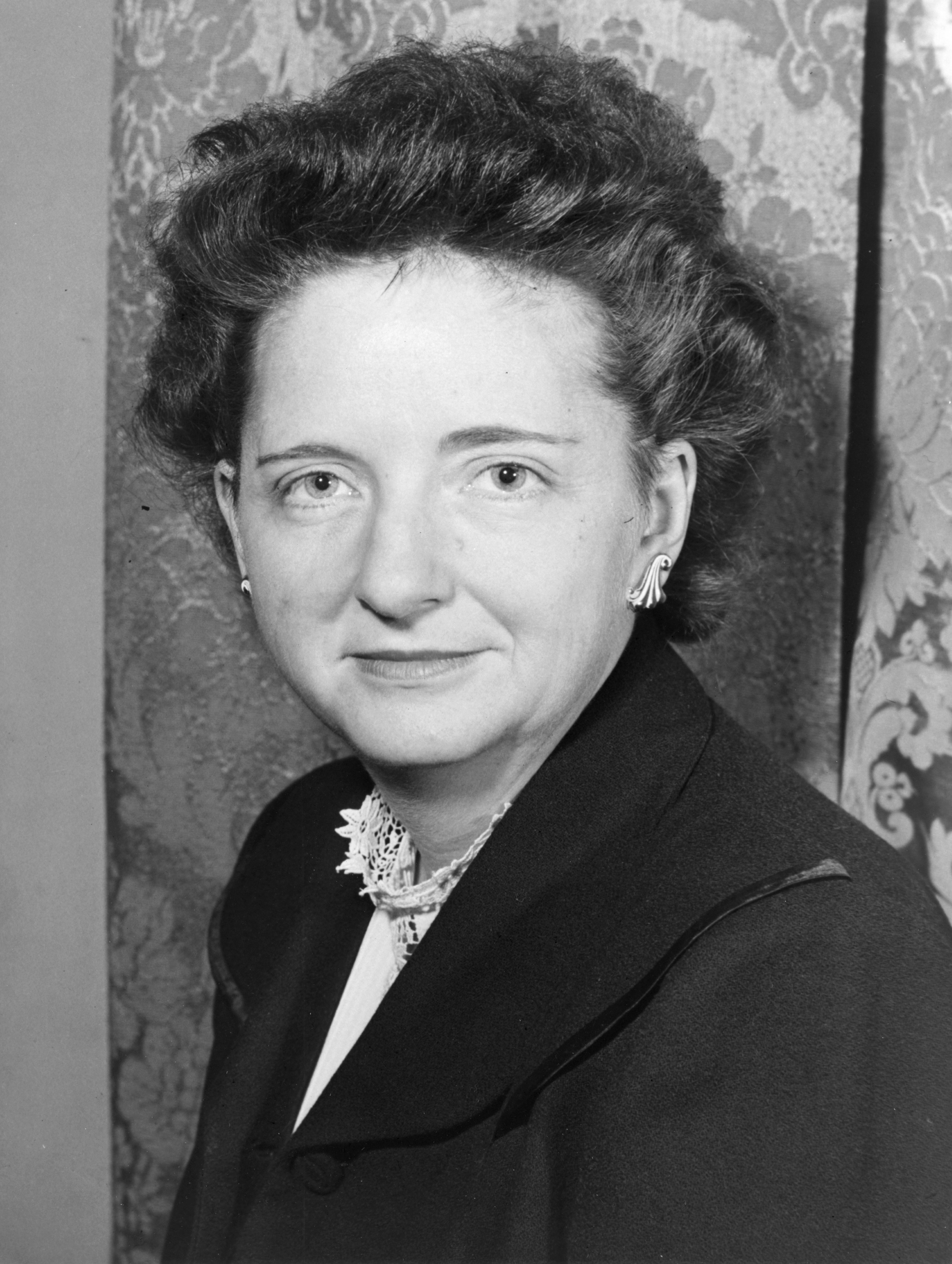
Elizabeth Bentley (here, in 1948) accused Remington of being a member of her Soviet spy network

According to later testimony by Remington, the espionage case that would change his life began in 1942 when he and his wife Ann started socializing with Joseph North, editor of the communist publication, New Masses. North was an old friend of Ann's mother. On one occasion, North invited Remington to lunch in New York City, at which time Remington was introduced to Jacob Golos, a supposed writer working on a book about war mobilization. Remington had a follow-up meeting with Golos in March 1942, and it was then that Remington was introduced to a woman identified as "Helen Johnson", a researcher helping Golos with his book. Only years later, Remington claimed, did he learn that Helen Johnson was actually Elizabeth Bentley.

On nearly a dozen occasions in 1942 and 1943, Remington met with Bentley and supplied her with information. The two of them would meet alone outside his War Production Board office without a corroborating third person present. She testified that the meetings occurred "on street corners, park benches and in secluded restaurants." In his testimony, Remington said "he had suggested a couple of times that she come to his office, but she always had an excuse for not doing so." The material he gave her included data on U.S. airplane production and other matters pertaining to the aircraft industry, as well as some information on an experimental process for manufacturing synthetic rubber from garbage. Remington later asserted (a) he was unaware "Helen Johnson" was connected with the Communist Party, (b) he believed she was a leftist researcher concerned whether American big business was fully aiding the Soviet war effort against Nazi Germany, and (c) the information he supplied her was publicly available.

But Bentley was a communist and an espionage agent for the Soviet Union. In 1945, she broke with the communists and became an informer for the FBI. She implicated a number of her contacts, including Remington. Bentley's revelations of Soviet espionage activities in the United States received a great deal of press attention. She identified more than 80 Americans—including several employees of government offices—as working for the Soviets, of whom only William Remington was still holding a government position.

Acting on Bentley's information, the FBI began secret surveillance of Remington in late 1945. He was by this time disillusioned with communism and had broken off his relationships with radical organizations, and so the investigation revealed nothing of interest. In 1946, Remington was working with the Office of War Mobilization and Reconversion. From there he transferred in March 1947 to a position with the President's Council of Economic Advisers, where he was paid an annual salary of $10,305. Because the FBI was keeping Bentley's testimony and its investigation of Remington secret, it raised no objection to his transfer, and he continued to serve in fairly high-level government posts.

In 1947, Remington was interviewed by the FBI and also questioned before a federal grand jury in New York City about the information he had given to Elizabeth Bentley. He testified that no confidential information was involved, and the issue seemed to end there. Remington became an anti-communist informer from this time and for the following year. He sent the FBI information on more than fifty people, only four of whom were connected with his own case. Most of those he named he had never met. He accused them of being Communists, isolationists, Negro nationalists, or "extreme liberals." He also verbally attacked his wife Ann, from whom he had become estranged, and his mother-in-law Elizabeth Moos, both avowed Communists.

Another loyalty investigation of Remington was opened early in 1948. In June, he was relieved of his duties pending the findings of that investigation. In July of that year, the New York World-Telegram published a series of articles about Elizabeth Bentley, and the Senate Permanent Subcommittee on Investigations opened hearings to investigate her allegations. At these hearings, Bentley made her accusations against Remington public. He denied her allegations. The Washington Post described him as "a boob...who was duped by clever Communist agents." At his loyalty review hearings, Remington downplayed his earlier connections with communist and leftist organizations. He said that his wife's adherence to communist doctrine was the reason for the end of their marriage.

While testifying before the Senate, Bentley was protected from libel suits. When she repeated her charge on NBC Radio's Meet the Press that Remington was a communist, he sued her and NBC for libel. At this point, Remington's case acquired considerable notoriety. When Remington's lawyers attempted to subpoena Bentley, she could not be found. Headlines included "RED WITNESS "MISSING" AT 100-G SLANDER SUIT" and the like. When she finally reappeared, she was subpoenaed for the libel suit.

She refused to testify at Remington's loyalty hearing. The Loyalty Review Board noted that the only serious evidence against Remington was "the uncorroborated statement of a woman who refuses to submit herself to cross-examination." It cleared Remington to return to his government post. The libel suit was settled out of court shortly thereafter, with NBC paying Remington $10,000.

== Second round of investigations ==
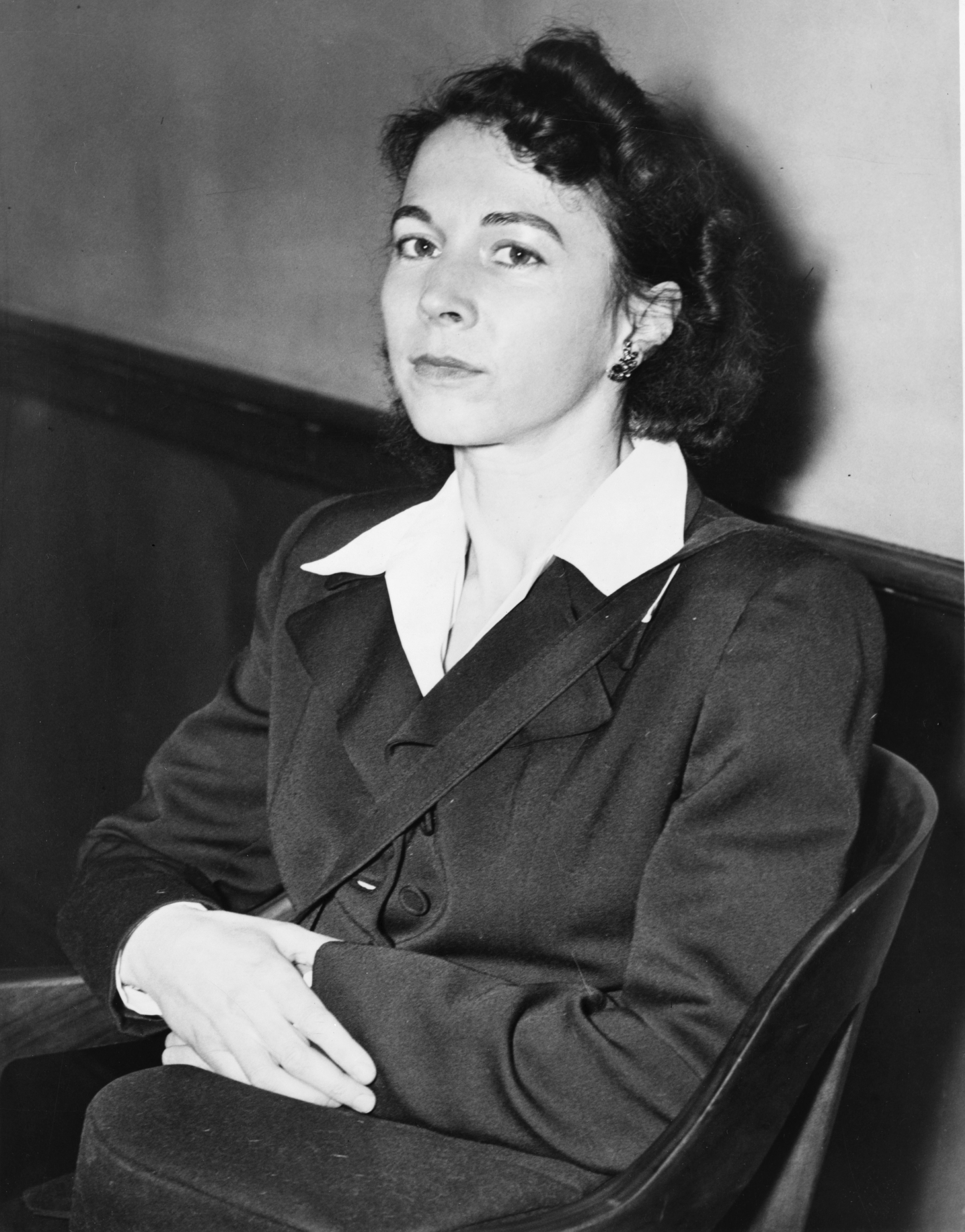
Ann Remington in Federal Court

In 1950, the FBI and the federal grand jury in New York City reopened their investigations of Remington, and the House Un-American Activities Committee (HUAC) opened a third investigation. Because of continuing suspicions about him, Remington had been demoted at the Commerce Department. His once-promising career in the Truman administration was stagnant. Ann Remington, now divorced from him, was subpoenaed to appear before the grand jury. She testified that her husband had been a dues-paying member of the Communist Party, and that he had given secret information to Elizabeth Bentley while knowing that Bentley was a Communist. A few days later she recanted, and stated that she would claim marital privilege and refuse to testify against her ex-husband in any trial. The grand jury decided to indict Remington for committing perjury when he denied ever being a member of the Communist Party.

== Trials ==
=== First trial (1950-1951) ===
Remington's first trial began in late December 1950. Roy Cohn, later to become famous as Joseph McCarthy's chief counsel and already a noted anti-communist, joined the prosecution's legal team.

"Elizabeth Bentley later supplied a wealth of detail about Remington's involvement with her and the espionage conspiracy. Remington's defense was that he had never handled any classified material, hence could not have given any to Miss Bentley. But she remembered all the facts about the rubber-from-garbage invention. We had searched through the archives and discovered the files on the process. We also found the aircraft schedules, which were set up exactly as she said, and inter office memos and tables of personnel which proved Remington had access to both these items. We also discovered Remington's application for a naval commission in which he specifically pointed out that he was, in his present position with the Commerce Department, entrusted with secret military information involving airplanes, armaments, radar, and the Manhattan Project (the atomic bomb)."

During the trial eleven witnesses claimed they knew Remington was a communist. They included Elizabeth Bentley, Ann Remington, Professor Howard Bridgeman of Tufts University, Kenneth McConnell, a communist organizer in Knoxville; Rudolph Bertram and Christine Benson, who worked with him at the Tennessee Valley Authority; and Paul Crouch, who claimed he provided Remington with copies of the southern edition of the communist newspaper, the Daily Worker.

Ann Moos Remington reversed herself again and testified that her ex-husband had been a Communist Party member and that he had knowingly given secret information to Elizabeth Bentley. Bentley testified, repeating her charge that Remington had given her secret information, saying with regard to the synthetic rubber formula, "He said to me that...he thought that the Russians would need something very much like this." The prosecution also showed that Remington had handled secret documents that were somewhat similar to the aircraft production information that Bentley said she received from him.

During the trial, the defense attorneys revealed that John Brunini, the foreman of the grand jury that indicted Remington, had a personal and financial relationship with Elizabeth Bentley and had agreed to co-author a book with her.

Remington was convicted after a seven-week trial. Judge Gregory E. Noonan sentenced him to five years, the maximum for perjury. He noted that Remington's act of perjury had involved disloyalty to his country. Remington's conviction was celebrated by many. A Washington Daily News editorial said: "William W. Remington now joins the odiferous list of young Communist punks who wormed their way upward in the Government under the New Deal. He was sentenced to five years in prison, and he should serve every minute of it. In Russia, he would have been shot without trial."

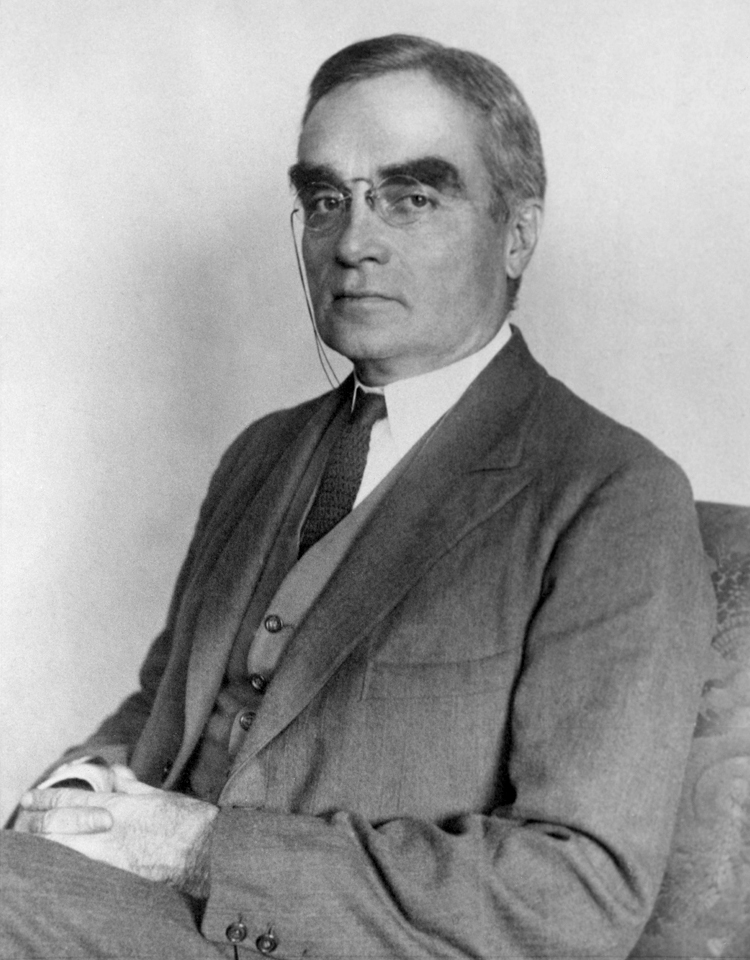
Judge Learned Hand (here, in 1910) overturned the first trial's verdict against Remington

Remington's attorneys appealed the verdict. The judicial panel hearing the case included Judge Learned Hand, one of the United States' most eminent jurists. The conviction was overturned on the grounds that Judge Noonan's instructions to the jury were too vague as to exactly what constituted "membership" in the Communist Party, and a new trial was ordered. Hand also criticized grand jury foreman John Brunini and Thomas Donegan, the assistant to the Attorney General who directed the grand jury investigation, for Brunini's relationship with Bentley, and for "judicial improprieties" in their abusive treatment of both Ann and William Remington during questioning.

=== Second trial (1953) ===
The government presented a new indictment, charging Remington with five counts of perjury based on his testimony during the first trial. The charge from the first trial, that he perjured himself when denying he had ever been a Communist Party member, was not included.

The second Remington trial began in January 1953 with Judge Vincent L. Leibell presiding. It lasted eight days. The jury found Remington guilty of two counts, for lying (1) when he said he had not given secret information to Elizabeth Bentley, and (2) when he claimed not to know in college of the existence of the Young Communist League, even though it had a chapter at Dartmouth while he was a student there. Leibell sentenced Remington to three years in prison.

== Imprisonment and murder ==
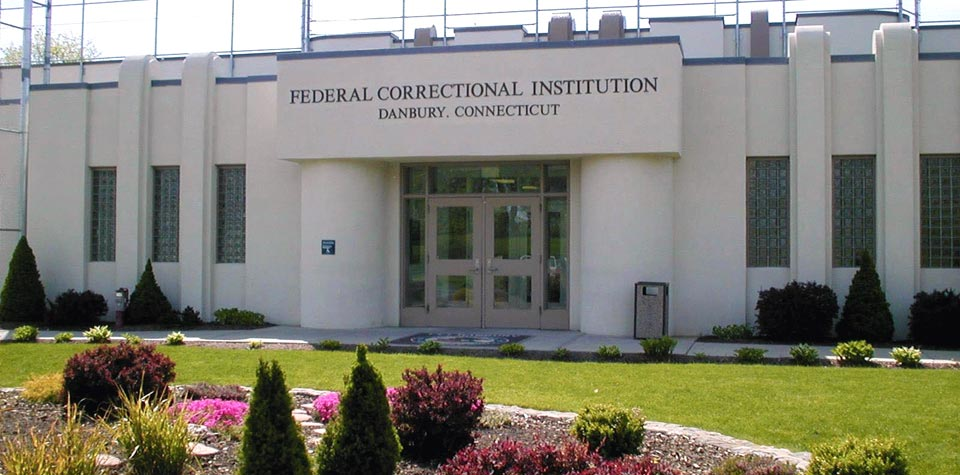
Federal Correctional Institution, Danbury (here, in 2016), where Remington served time

While his attorneys prepared another appeal, Remington began his sentence at Danbury Federal Correctional Institution. There he became friends with fellow prisoner, nonviolent action theorist Gene Sharp, before Remington was transferred to Lewisburg. The appeals court upheld the original verdict, and in February 1954, the Supreme Court declined to hear the case.

Among the inmates at Lewisburg was George McCoy, a violent man with an I.Q. of 61. McCoy was known to have made a number of angry remarks about Remington's alleged communism. On the morning of November 22, 1954, McCoy convinced another inmate, 17-year-old juvenile delinquent Lewis Cagle Jr., to join him in attacking Remington as he slept. Cagle used a piece of brick in a sock as a weapon, striking Remington four times on the head. A third man, Robert Carl Parker, also participated. Two days later, November 24, 1954, Remington died of his injuries.

The prison warden described it to Remington's second wife as "not a personal attack against Bill...but just the actions of a couple of hoodlums who got all worked up by...the publicity about Communists." The FBI said that robbery was the motive for the crime. His funeral was held in Ridgewood, New Jersey on November 28, 1954.

== Aftermath ==
Press attention focused on whether more should have been done to protect Remington in prison, and whether his murder was motivated by anti-communism. When Cagle confessed, the FBI instructed him to describe the crime as if he and McCoy had been trying to rob Remington. When McCoy confessed four days later, he said he hated Remington for being a communist and denied any robbery motive.

Worried that Cagle and McCoy's confessions might be ruled inadmissible, and afraid that a jury would be sympathetic toward men who murdered a communist, U.S. attorney J. Julius Levy later accepted guilty pleas of second degree murder from McCoy, Cagle, and Parker. McCoy and Cagle both received life sentences, while Parker received a 20-year sentence.

Remington remained a puzzling figure for Americans who had difficulty understanding how a "golden boy" from a prestigious family could get caught up in espionage. In his memoir, the investigative journalist Fred J. Cook recounted an incident that illustrated the prevailing sentiment of the time. In early 1957, he was approached by Edward Fitzgerald, editor of Saga magazine:

"Fred, we've been wondering whether you could do a good, in-depth piece for us on William Remington. We'd like to answer the question why a man like Remington from a good family background, a choirboy in his youth, later became a Communist and a spy. It's like the Alger Hiss case. What motivates such men? We'd like to get some insight into what changes men from such good, solid, conservative backgrounds into Communists and traitors to their country. Do you think you could do that for us?"

== Marriage and family ==
Remington was married twice. He and Ann Moos had two children, Galeyn and Bruce. After he divorced Ann, he married Jane Alben. They had a son Neil together.

== Legacy ==
Remington's biographer Gary May concludes:

Clearly, Remington was no political innocent duped by the Communists, and his conviction for perjury seems justified. Yet Remington was no pro-Soviet automaton, no slave to Party or ideology, and not even the FBI, at least privately, was willing to classify him as a Russian spy.

== See also ==
- McCarthyism
- Communist Party of the United States

== Sources ==
- May, Gary (1994). Un-American Activities: The Trials of William Remington. New York: Oxford University Press.
