= Contempo =

Contempo can refer to:

- Contempo: A Review of Books and Personalities
- Fender Contempo Organ
- University of Chicago Contemporary Chamber Players
- Contempo Casuals, a former women's clothing retailer that was acquired by Wet Seal
- Contempo (band), the former band of Richard Archer from Hard-Fi
