= Colorado River Basin Salinity Control Act =

The Colorado River Basin Salinity Control Act, Public Law 93-320, and the laws authorizing three other conservation cost-sharing programs were begun June 24, 1974. In the 1996 farm bill, Public Law 104-127, they were repealed and replaced by a new cost-sharing program, the Environmental Quality Incentives Program (EQIP).

== Program - Public Law 93-320 ==
The Colorado River Basin Salinity Control Act (SCA), Public Law 93-320, was enacted 24 June 1974. The SCA was an Act to authorize the construction, operation, and maintenance of certain works in the Colorado River Basin to control the salinity of water delivered to users in the United States and Mexico.

The law was administered by the Farm Service Agency until FY1996, when management was transferred to the Natural Resources Conservation Service.

=== Participation ===
Until it was replaced, the Colorado River Basin Salinity Control Program provided cost-sharing assistance to producers to install on-farm irrigation system improvements to prevent irrigation water heavily charged with salts and minerals from reentering the Colorado River. Participating farmers received up to 70% of total project costs and technical assistance. Participation was concentrated at sites where problems existed. This program was available to producers in the seven states of the Colorado River watershed.

=== Amendments - Public Law 93-320 ===
The SCA has been amended five times:

- Public Law 98-569, "An Act to Amend the Salinity Control Act, enacted 30 October 1984;
- Public Law 104-20, "An Act to Amend the Salinity Control Act, enacted 28 July 1995;
- Public Law 104-127. "Federal Agricultural Improvement and Reform Act of 1996, enacted 4 April 1996;
- Public Law 106-459, "An Act to Amend the Salinity Control Act, " enacted 7 November 2000;
- Public Law 110-234, "Food, Conservation, and Energy Act of 2008" enacted 22 May 2008.

== Program - Public Law 98-569 ==
PL98-569 authorized the Secretary of Agriculture to develop and implement a voluntary on-farm program by:

- (1) identifying irrigation salt source areas,
- (2) developing and implementing salinity control plans,
- (3) providing technical and financial assistance to individuals, group, and irrigation districts or canal companies for implementing on-farm and related lateral improvements,
- (4) conducting education, research, and demonstration activities,
- (5) provide on-farm irrigation water management assistance,
- (6) conduct monitoring and evaluation activities to determine program effectiveness,
- (7) require 30 percent local cost sharing from implementation of on-farm improvements with 30 percent of the balance of the funds repaid in the same manner as the Interior Department's program from the Upper and Lower Basin funds.

PL98-569 also authorized the Bureau of Land Management (BLM) to proceed with planning for the Sinbad Valley Unit and to develop a program to minimize salt contributions to the Colorado River from lands administered by the BLM.

=== Amendments - Public Law 98-569 ===
Public Law 98-569 amendments included:

- (1) authorization of construction of two new salinity control units, Stage 1 of the Lower Gunnison Basin Unit and the McElmo Creek Unit as a part of the Dolores Project,
- (2) the use of cost-effectiveness as a decision-making criteria,
- (3) new authority for the Secretary of the Interior to contract with non-Federal entities for organization, construction, operation, maintenance, and replacement of authorized salinity control facilities,
- (4) requiring the replacing of incidental fish and wildlife values foregone as salinity control units are constructed,
- (5) requiring thirty percent cost sharing from the Upper and Lower Basin funds on the newly authorized units to be repaid during the year the expenditures are made or over time with interest and
- (6) deauthorized the Crystal Geyser Unit.

== See also ==
- Colorado River
