= National Resources Board of 1934 =

National Resources Board of 1934 or National Resources Planning Board was established by Franklin Roosevelt in July 1933. President Roosevelt created the federal government committee by the authority of the National Industrial Recovery Act of 1933 by issuance of Executive Order 6777. The body was part of the Public Works Administration. The body was abolished in June 1943.

== National Resources Board Purposes ==
The national board was entrusted as an advisory committee for natural resources information. The National Resources Committee published analysis and land-use planning reports from 1934 to 1943.

The Executive Order charged the advisory board with several proposed objectives.

- Designated Advisory Committee

Frederic Adrian Delano
Charles Edward Merriam
Wesley Clair Mitchell
Additional members may be added by order of the U.S. President
Technical committee is prohibited from a fixed membership or tenure of office as selected by the Board

- Program and plan of procedure analyzing the physical, social, governmental, and economic aspects of public policies for the development and use of land, water, and other national resources
- Board to provide a report on land and water use on or before December 1, 1934
- Program and plan shall include the coordination of projects of Federal, State, and local governments.
- Program and plan shall include the proper division of responsibility and the fair division of cost among governmental authorities

== Abolishment of Associated Authorities ==
In pursuant of Executive Order 6777, the national resources board abolished relative federal government authorities.

- National Planning Board of Federal Emergency Administration of Public Works
- Committee on National Land Problems created by Executive Order No. 6695 on April 28, 1934

== See also ==
Land Utilization Program
1936 North American cold wave
1936 North American heat wave
Dust Bowl
Harold L. Ickes
Natural Resources Conservation Service
Rural economics
Soil conservation
Soil Conservation and Domestic Allotment Act of 1936
