= Conservation technical assistance =

Conservation technical assistance (CTA) has been the central activity of the Natural Resources Conservation Service (NRCS) since it was established in 1936.

NRCS field staff help landowners and farm operators plan and implement soil, water conservation, and water quality practices. The basis for much of this assistance is conservation practices described in the field office technical guide. Each year, NRCS issues an accomplishments report. Examples of: accomplishments cited for FY2003 include:

- Planning and applying resource management systems on almost 20 million acres (81,000 km^{2}) of cropland and grazing land;
- Helping landowners install conservation buffers on almost 500,000 acres (2,000 km^{2});
- Creating, restoring or enhancing 334,000 acres (1,350 km^{2}) of wetlands;
- Helping producers apply nutrient management on 3,200,000 acres (13,000 km^{2}).
