= Paul Crouch (activist) =

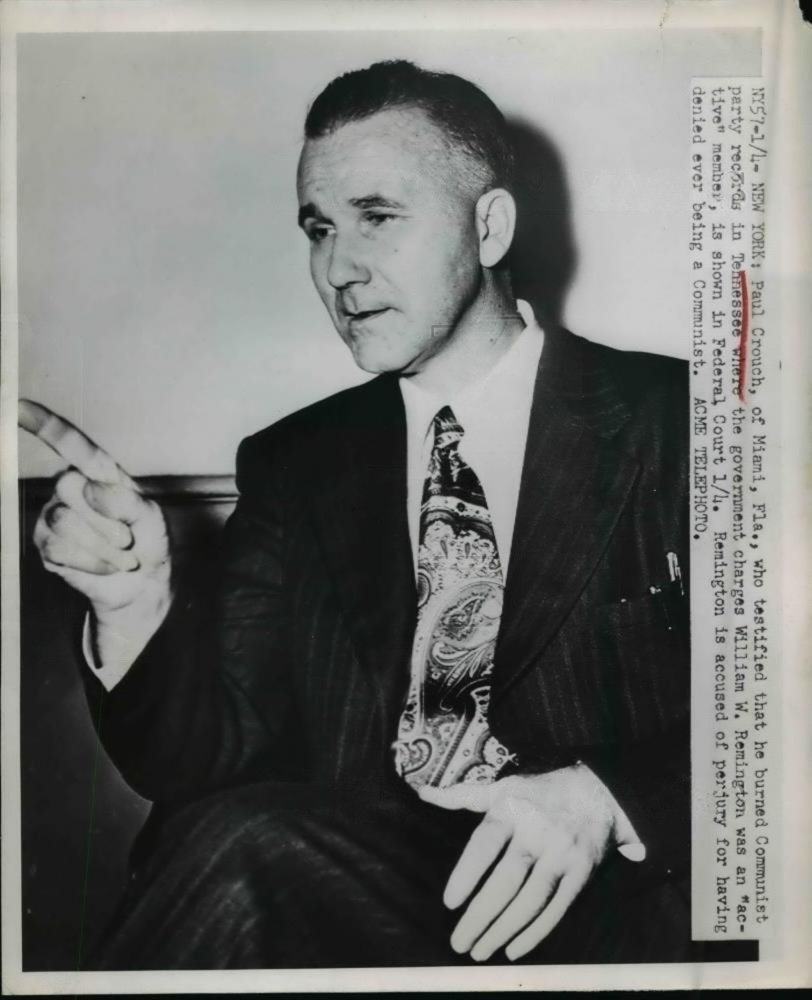
- Crouch in 1951
- Born: Paul Crouch; June 24, 1903; Moravian Falls, North Carolina, U.S.
- Died: November 18, 1955 (aged 52); Berkeley, California, U.S.
- Spouse: Sylvia Crouch
- Espionage activity
- Allegiance: USSR, USA
- Service years: 1924-1942 (CPUSA), 1949-1954 (U.S. Department of Justice)

Paul Crouch /pʊəl kraʊtʃ/ (June 24, 1903 – November 18, 1955) was an American communist activist and then paid government informer regarding communist infiltration in the U.S. federal government. Crouch biographer Gregory Taylor has called him a "naïve, ill-educated recruit" to the Communist Party. Oppenheimer biographers Kai Bird and Martin J. Sherwin have claimed that he was the "most highly paid" informer for the Justice Department in 1951–1952.

== Background ==
Paul Crouch was born in Moravian Falls, North Carolina, on June 24, 1903.

== Career ==
=== Communism ===
Crouch was a worker, secretary, and newspaper editor. In April 1924, he joined the U.S. Army. While stationed in Hawaii, he formed a Hawaiian Communist League (1924–1927) with 75 other soldiers and supported a local strike on a sugar plantation. On February 17, 1925, the military arrested the group and singled out Crouch as their leader. After discharging the others, they sentenced him to 40 years of hard labor.

Crouch contacted Upton Sinclair, who gained support from the Daily Worker newspaper and the International Labor Defense (ILD), both affiliates of the nascent Communist Party. Thanks to the efforts of ILD lawyer Austin Lewis, Crouch served another 24 months in Alcatraz on a commuted three-year sentence. Crouch emerged on June 1, 1927, as a "national cause célèbre" to the Communist Party, thanks to the Daily Worker.

Crouch moved to New York City, where he joined the Workers Party of America. He worked at the Daily Worker, where he met Whittaker Chambers on staff.

The Party sent him with George Mink on a mission to Moscow from December 1927 to April 1928. He attended the Sixth Plenum of the Executive Committee of the Comintern. He attended what he later called the "Frunze Institute." In Moscow, he met Mikhail Tukhachevsky, Lenin's wife Nadezhda Krupskaya, Klara Zetkin, and "Big" Bill Haywood. He also meet Sam Darcy there.

Crouch returned from Moscow, charged with fomenting national self-determination of African Americans in the "Black Belt" of the American South — from the states of Maryland to Texas. Practically speaking, the American party supported African Americans legally (see Scottsboro Case) but did not go so far as to promote national self-determination.

Following the defeat of the CPUSA ticket for the 1928 Presidential Election of William Z. Foster and Benjamin Gitlow, Crouch toured the South but found little support except in North Carolina. He supported the 1929 Loray Mill strike in Gastonia, North Carolina. He supported the National Textile Workers’ Union (NTWU, now TWUA). He also worked on a strike in Norfolk, Virginia, under the name "Fred Allen."

He later claimed to have served the CPUSA as:

- 1933–1934: Utah state organizer
- 1934–1937: Carolina state organizer
- 1938–1939: Alabama state organizer (and editor of the ‘’New South’’)
- 1939–1941: Tennessee state organizer
- 1941–1942: Alameda Country, California, organizer

=== Anti-communism ===
Crouch claimed to have broken from the CPUSA in January 1942, although the Party renewed his membership for 1943.

During five years as a paid government informer, he testified regarding Robert Oppenheimer, Harry Bridges, Charlie Chaplin, William Remington, Milton A. Abernethy, and many others as Communists. He alleged that Communist conspiracy had reached the White House and inspired the civil rights movement.

During his testimony on May 6, 1949, he spoke at length about efforts by the CPUSA to continue to infiltrate the U.S. Army. He also mentioned alleged communists known to him, including Harry Bridges (strike organizer), William Schneiderman (California CP), Robert Oppenheimer (atomic scientist), including Haakon Chevalier (translator). Clearly, the committee tried to connect Crouch to the Hiss Case. During the years 1934–1937, he testified that he had worked under J. Peters, Max Bedacht, daughter Elsa Bedacht, and Peter's replacement Rudy Baker. He knew George Mink. He also knew Alexander Trachtenberg well. (Bedacht and Peters recruited Whittaker Chambers to the underground, while George Mink was an early underground comrade. Chambers’ wife Esther Shemitz illustrated a book for International Publishers.) However, he did not know Isaac Folkoff or William Edward Crane (AKA Irving Keith), people in one of Chambers’ earlier networks. (It is worth noting that J. Peters, already under federal investigation, left the U.S. permanently on May 8, 1949, two days after Crouch's testimony.)

During 1951–1952, Crouch was the "most highly paid" informer for the Justice Department and earned $9,675 (more than $87,000 in inflation-adjusted 2016 dollars) during those two years.

During the same period, he lectured across the U.S., sometimes with his wife Sylvia and fellow informant Louis Budenz.

In 1953, Crouch testified in a deportation hearing of Jacob Burck that he had often seen Burck at Communist Party meetings, yet failed to correctly identify him at that hearing.

=== Discredited ===
On January 5, 1953, an appeals board overturned the decision regarding the loyalty of Mary Dublin Keyserling, wife of Leon Keyserling, both New Deal economists. After being cleared of disloyalty, Mary Keyserling was reinstated to her role in the Department of Commerce but both Keyserlings retired from their government roles on January 9. Crouch, J. B. Matthews, and Senator Joseph McCarthy were their chief accusers. Mary Keyserling returned to work in government roles under President Johnson.

Reporters Joseph Alsop, Stewart Alsop, and Drew Pearson began to challenge Crouch's realibilty as a witness after his testimony in United States of America v. Kuzma, et al. In May 1954, United States Attorney General Herbert Brownell Jr. announced he was investigating Crouch for possible perjury and to determine his suitablity as a government witness in future trials. The following month, affidavits accusing Crouch of multiple cases of perjury were filed which led to the overturning of the deportation order against Pulitzer-prize winning political cartoonist, Jacob Burck. Within a few months, Justice stopped using Crouch as a witness. In 1955, supreme court justices agreed that Crouch and Manning Johnson had made allegations under perjury.

=== Death ===
Crouch died on November 18, 1955, at the hospital of the University of California at Berkeley in Berkeley, California, of cancer of the throat and bronchial tubes.

== Legacy ==
At his death, one of the people whom he had accused wrote:

In his testimony before the Courts, Congressional Committees, and Loyalty Boards, Crouch did just what he was hired to do and, whatever may be said about him, he gave his employers full value of what they wanted of him. He died lonely and despised by those who used him. Those who hired him remain respectable and powerful. They used him and when he was no longer useful they threw him aside. There are plenty of others to take his place. His very death was a final act of service to his hirers, for by it he became purged of his evil doing and they, of their responsibility for using him, for of the dead we should speak only good. Our Attorney General will now be spared the embarrassment of answering questions about the progress of his long delayed "study" of Crouch's conflicting testimony or about what is being done to right the wrongs done his victims.

== Works ==
- ‘’Broken Chains’’ (unpublished manuscript about his CPUSA career 1925–1942)

== Images ==
- Paul Crouch testifies against Clarence Hiskey
- Paul Crouch 1951 (Getty Images)

== See also ==
- Elizabeth Bentley
- Louis Budenz
- Harvey Matusow
- Manning Johnson
- Herbert Philbrick
- William Remington
- Milton A. Abernethy
- Anti-communism

== External sources ==
- "Register of the Paul Crouch Papers, 1925-1958". Online Archive of California.
- "Testimony of Paul Crouch". Committee on Un-American Activities. 1949.
- Taylor, Gregory S. (2014). The Life and Lies of Paul Crouch: Communist, Opportunist, Cold War Snitch. Gainesville, Florida: University Press of Florida. p. 340.
- Taylor, Gregory S. (2009). The History of the North Carolina Community Party. University of South Carolina Press. p. 258.
- Paul Crouch (1903–1955) East Carolina University
