= Journal of Soil and Water Conservation =

- Discipline: Earth and atmospheric sciences, Soil science
- Language: English

Standard abbreviations
- ISO 4: J. Soil Water Conserv.

Indexing
- ISSN: 1941-3300

The Journal of Soil and Water Conservation is a bimonthly peer-reviewed journal of conservation science, practice, and policy. The journal is published by the Soil and Water Conservation Society.
