= Contempo: A Review of Books and Personalities =

December 1931 cover of Contempo featuring Langston Hughes' "Christ in Alabama".

Contempo, A Review of Books and Personalities was a "literary and social commentary" published by Milton A. Abernethy and Anthony Buttitta at Chapel Hill, North Carolina from 1931 to 1934. Though less well-known than some of its contemporaries, Contempo fits into the tradition of the "Little Magazine," a group of elite literary magazines pervasive in the first decades of the twentieth century.

== Ideology ==
The Little Magazines, Contempo included, were influential in the popularization of modernism, both as it influenced literary and visual arts. They were often sympathetic to leftist social ideologies such as anarchism, communism and socialism. The publication's original subtitle, "A Review of Ideas and Personalites," reflects the editors' interest in political as well as literary ideas. Appropriately, then, Contempo incorporated a wide variety of genres in its format, including book reviews, literary and political essays, prose, poetry, short stories, and works in progress. The editors of Contempo aimed to "carry on the pioneering spirit of Margaret Anderson's The Little Review" by identifying and publishing emerging creative writers

Contempo sought to be a publication where authors could freely publish their own work, as well as critique other authors and respond to criticisms. Abernethy stated the magazine’s policy as: (1) complete freedom from all cliques whatsoever, (2) asylum for aggrieved authors, (3) encouraging literary controversy, and (4) the rapid reception of new ideas." To this end, the magazine included "author-review," a novel format which allowed writers to pronounce upon their own work. It was this feature which made the magazine so attractive to many writers, despite the lack of remuneration for their work. (Contempo, like most other Little Mags, was a non-commercial venture and its contributors received no compensation.)

== History ==
The idea for Contempo originated with five college classmates at the University of North Carolina at Chapel Hill: Milton Avant Abernethy, Anthony J. Buttitta, Shirley Carter, Phil Liskin, and Vincent Garoffolo. These five were students of Pulitzer Prize winner, Paul Eliot Green, author of In Abraham's Bosom. The first issue of Contempo was produced by these five out of a college dorm room in May 1931. The Daily Tar Heel, the student paper, announced that, '"in conjunction with the magazine, the editors are operating... the "Intimate Bookshop" in one of the dormitory rooms"' The next month, the Bookshop moved to Franklin Street, an '"attractive and central location... where any cautious co-eds may now join the booklovers on their daily pilgrimage."' The original five editors did not stay affiliated for long: two left Chapel Hill, Shirley Carter for Washington and Philip Liskin for Russia. Vincent Garoffolo remained in Chapel Hill, but transitioned from editor to poet: "the 21 August issue, one of the last to list Garoffolo as editor, noted that he had just completed a volume of experimental verse entitled Halted Tears.

Abernethy and Buttitta settled in as dual editors by November 1931, but they worked to collect a prestigious list of critics as collaborators (see listing below). Ezra Pound, who was foreign editors to several other little magazines, was originally listed as a contributing editor, but requested in a letter marked 20 December 1932 that his name be removed from the list of contributing editors, saying that "There always has been a great deal in Contempo that I do not stand for, and if it is to pay its way, there will probably be more. So please leave my name OFF the list of edtrs. Pound's request was granted when the list of contributing editors was dropped altogether from the publication, starting with the 21 February issue.

The first volume of Contempo was experimental, spirited, and, as a letter to the editors from Louis Untermeyer noted, somewhat indiscriminate and vague in tone. The publication began to achieve some cohesion by centering its efforts around special issues. For example, two issues were devoted to the notorious Scottsboro boys trial, one in mid-July 1931, and one on 1 December 1931. Interest in Contempo's coverage of the trials drove demand for the publication up dramatically: the editors printed 6,500 copies for the December issue, as opposed to 1,500 in July. Langston Hughes provided poetry and prose for the second issue, notably "Christ in Alabama" on the cover.

Less controversial but equally significant was the special Faulkner issue of 1 February 1932. The issue featured nine of Faulkner's poems, his short story, "Once Aboard the Lugger," as well as advertisements for several of the writer's novels and praises for recently published Faulkner novels in the "Book Reviews" section. The Faulkner issue was the first of many issues which highlighted either a single author (as with the Bob Brown or Hart Crane issues), or regional schools of authors, as with the southern issue of 25 September 1932. The serialization of Nathanael West's Miss Lonelyhearts, beginning in the 5 July 1932 issue was another important stage in the history of Contempo. Not only did the magazine feature the novel, it also published an author-review as well as numerous favorable reviews by noted writers, including William Carlos Williams.

Despite the growing popularity of Contempo in the literary community, relations between its two editors deteriorated rapidly, resulting in the end of their collaboration in the fall of 1932. Though the exact cause of the break between the two men is undocumented, "the correspondence files give some evidence that friction resulted when Abernethy's wife, Minna, became editor in October 1932. Buttitta is last listed as editor in the 21 November 1932 issue, although Abernethy's editorial note clearly shows that the split between them had already occurred: "Mr. Buttitta's name appears among the editors in order to credit him for work done on this special issue of Contempo. Page two of the 10 January 1933 issue baldly states: "The last five issues of Contempo (since July) have been financed and published by the editors listed above [Milton and Minna Abernethy] without the aid of one of the former editors, Mr. A.J. Buttitta." After splitting with the Abernethys, Buttitta moved to Durham, North Carolina and, convinced that the rights to Contempo were his, began printing his own publication under that name. Abernethy hotly contested Buttitta's ownership of Contempo, stating in the 10 January 1933 issue that "Any paper which Mr. Buttitta might publish, whether it bear the name Contempo or not, will in no way be connected with the original and authentic Contempo, will not have access to the editorial materials sent to the original Contempo on the strength of the reputation it has built for itself in the past two years, nor will it reach the regular subscribers of Contempo". Buttitta published two of his own issues of Contempo from Durham before he lost the legal rights to Abernethy. The dispute, which was very public, resulted in the implosion of both Abernethy and Buttitta's versions of the magazine. By 1934, the Abernethy's were making their exodus from editing, leaving the sole issue of Contempo in the hands of guest editor Stuart Gilbert.

== The Editors ==
Milton Avant Abernethy (Editor, 1931–1934) Contempo was edited by Milton “Ab” Abernethy, a "nonthreatening and generous Communist“. As a 19-year-old sophomore at NC State University, Abernethy published several contentious articles criticizing administrative policies. He was ultimately expelled for "disservice to the school". In January 1931, Abernethy transferred to Chapel Hill, where he met Anthony Buttitta. Together, they created the Intimate Bookshop as the home base for their new magazine, Contempo. Plagued by financial difficulties, Abernethy took a job with the US Department of Agriculture in 1932. There he met and married Minna Krupsky. After Buttitta's departure from Contempo, the couple co-edited the magazine. Contempo ceased publication in 1934, at which time the Abernethys "turned their Chapel Hill bookstore...into a moneymaker." They eventually moved to New York where Abernethy became a successful stockbroker.

Minna (Karp) Abernethy (Editor, Fall 1932-1934) A Russian Immigrant to the United States, Minna Karp met Milton Abernethy in 1932 when he was working in the US Department of Agriculture. The two married, and after Buttitta's departure from Chapel Hill, the couple co-edited the magazine.

Anthony J. Buttitta (Editor, 1931 - March 1932) Buttitta was born in Monroe, Louisiana in 1907, the son of immigrants from Sicily. He published his first plays and stories in the later 1920s as an undergraduate at Louisiana State Normal College and the University of Texas. Buttitta was an English graduate student at Chapel Hill when he met Milton Abernethy and co-founded Contempo. Soon after the magazine’s inception, tensions grew between Abernethy and Buttitta. In 1932, Buttitta moved to Durham and opened his own Intimate Bookshop. He published two of his own issues of Contempo before losing the legal rights to Abernethy, after which time Contempo resumed its sole published location in Chapel Hill, edited by “Ab” and his wife, Minna K. Abernethy. Buttitta later moved to Asheville, where he associated with author F. Scott Fitzgerald, an experience he recorded in his books, After the Good Gay Times and The Lost Summer: a Personal Memoir of F. Scott Fitzgerald

== The Contributors ==
Though short-lived, the magazine published many notable writers, including:

- Conrad Aiken
- Louis Adamic^
- Sherwood Anderson
- Samuel Beckett
- Bob Brown (Brown issue 31 August 1932)
- Kay Boyle^
- James Branch Cabell
- Erskine Caldwell
- Malcolm Cowley
- Hart Crane (Crane issue 5 July 1932)
- Countee Cullen
- E. E. Cummings
- John Dos Passos
- S.J. Perelman
- Theodore Dreiser
- T.S. Eliot
- James T. Farrell
- William Faulkner^ (Faulkner issue 1 February 1932)
- Paul Green^
- H.D.
- Langston Hughes^ (featured in Scottsboro trials issue 1 December 1931)
- Aldous Huxley
- Robinson Jeffers
- James Joyce (Joyce issue 15 February 1934)
- D.H. Lawrence
- Sinclair Lewis
- H.L. Mencken
- Lewis Mumford^
- Eugene O'Neill
- Luigi Pirandello
- Ezra Pound^
- George Bernard Shaw(Shaw issue 21 November 1932)
- Upton Sinclair
- Wallace Stevens
- Nathanael West
- William Carlos Williams
- John Vassos (Illustrations for Buttitta's alternate Contempo)

^Indicates that this person was listed as a contributing editor.

== Archival Holdings ==
Contempo Papers. Harry Ransom Humanities Research Center, Austin Texas. “In addition to a [nearly] complete run of the magazine, Buttitta's collection of literary correspondence is held at the Ransom Center, as well as five hundred twenty-five submitted manuscripts and business papers for the magazine and bookshop.”

Contempo Records #4408, 1930-1934. The Southern Historical Collection at The Louis Round Wilson Special Collections Library. U of North Carolina at Chapel Hill.

The Tony Buttitta Literary Archive. Thomas Cooper Library, University of SC. “The Buttitta archive in the University of South Carolina’s Department of Rare Books & Special Collections (MSS 2005:1) spans the whole of Tony Buttitta’s career. More than forty archival boxes of typescripts, papers, and memorabilia document, not only the breadth of his literary interests and his connections with other writers, but also the substantial nature of his own work and achievements.”

== Sources ==
- Buttitta, Anthony. After the Good Gay Times. New York: Viking, 1974.
- --. "Contempo Caravan Kites in a Windstorm." DLB Yearbook. 1985. Ed. Jean W. Ross. Detroit: Gale Research, 1986. 109-124.
- --. The Lost Summer: A Personal Memoir of F. Scott Fitzgerald. New York: St. Martin’s Press, 1987.
- Colquitt, Clare. “’Contempo’ Magazine: Asylum for Aggrieved Authors.” Library Chronicle of the University of Texas 27 (1984): 19-45.
- Contempo Magazine. North Carolina: Orange Printing: (1931-34) Vol. 3.
- "Contempo Papers". Harry Ransom Humanities Research Center. Austin Texas.
- "Contempo Records #4408, 1930-1934". The Southern Historical Collection at The Louis Round Wilson Special Collections Library. University of North Carolina at Chapel Hill.
- Hay, Judith. “A History and Index of Contempo.” Master’s Thesis. U of Louisville, 1971.
- Hutchisson, James M. "Nathanael West, Miss Lonelyhearts, and Contempo Magazine." Resources for American Literary Studies. 24.1. (1998): 84-100.
- "Little Magazines and Modernism". Davidson College. 2006.
- "The Tony Buttitta Literary Archive". Thomas Cooper Library, University of South Carolina.
- Vickers, Jim. "A Week or Three Days in Chapel Hill: Faulkner, Contempo, and Their Contemporaries." North Carolina Literary Review (1992 Summer). 1:1: 17-29.
