= 1936 North American heat wave =

Extreme weather event

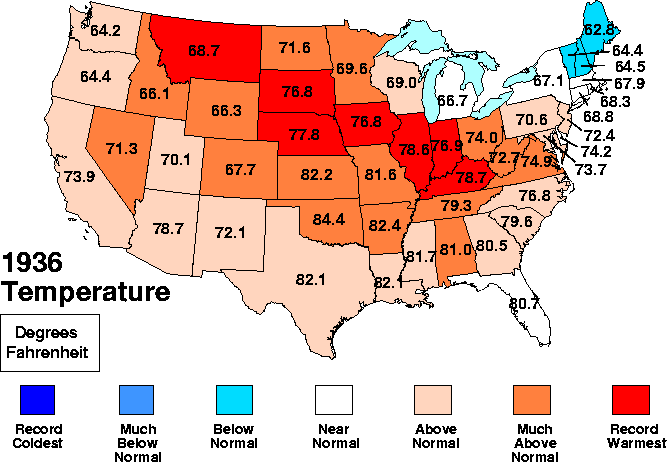
Summer (June–August) 1936 average temperature, in degrees Fahrenheit. Record warmest and coldest is based on a 112-year period of records (1895–2006).

The 1936 North American heat wave was one of the most severe heat waves in the modern history of North America. It took place in the middle of the Great Depression and Dust Bowl of the 1930s and caused more than 5,000 deaths. Many state and city record high temperatures set during the 1936 heat wave stood until the 2012 North American heat wave. Many more endure to this day; as of 2022, 13 state record high temperatures were set in 1936. The 1936 heat wave followed one of the coldest winters on record.

== June 1936 ==
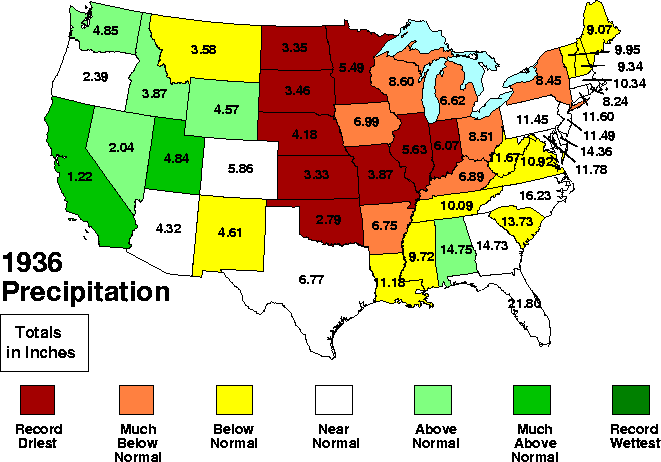
Summer (June–August) 1936 precipitation, in inches. Record wettest and driest is based on a 112-year period of records (from 1895 until 2006).

High temperatures began briefly in the Northeast from June 1 to 3. On June 3, Allentown, Pennsylvania, had a high of 95 °F (35 °C) (20 °F (11 °C) above the average) while New York City had a high of 90 °F (32 °C). Baltimore, Maryland, had a high of 96 °F (36 °C), just below the daily record high set in 1925. As the month went on, heat began to build in the Rocky Mountains and over the Southeast.

=== Western United States ===
Salt Lake City, Utah, started off with below average temperatures but would see record highs of 101 °F (38 °C) on both June 20 and 22. Grand Junction, Colorado, saw five days above 100 °F (38 °C) with record highs set from June 18 through 20. Areas east of the Rockies in Colorado varied greatly, with Pueblo seeing one day above 100 °F (38 °C) (June 18) while Lamar saw eleven consecutive days with highs above 100 °F (38 °C). Cheyenne, Wyoming, (with typical highs averaging 75 °F (24 °C)) saw highs averaging 90 °F (32 °C) with a record 95 °F (35 °C) high for June 18. In Ashton, Idaho, a record high for the month of June was set on June 27 at 98 °F (37 °C).

=== Southeast and Midwest ===
In the South, the heat started in the Gulf Coast states with Atlanta, Georgia seeing low to mid-90s in the early part of the month followed by Birmingham, Alabama seeing a string of mid-90 °F (32 °C) highs from June 6 through 10. Following this, intense heat began to build in the region by mid-month. From June 16 through 19, highs were in the upper 90s to near 100 °F (38 °C) in Birmingham. In a similar time frame, Huntsville, Alabama saw a string of five days above 100 °F (38 °C) with only one day not setting a new daily record high. In Mississippi, Jackson and Meridian both saw highs in the upper 90s while Greenville and Tupelo saw highs in the 100s. For some areas, June 17 was the hottest day of the month with Atlanta setting a daily record high of 102 °F (39 °C) and Evansville, Indiana hitting 100 °F (38 °C).

On June 19, as the heat began to spread northward, multiple areas in the Midwest saw record daily highs, including St. Louis and Kansas City, Missouri, and Topeka, Kansas.

On June 20, Arkansas, Louisiana, Mississippi, and Missouri all set all-time, monthly record highs: Corning, Arkansas, hit 113 °F (45 °C), Dodson, Louisiana, hit 110 °F (43 °C), Greenwood, Mississippi, hit 111 °F (44 °C), and Doniphan, Missouri, hit 112 °F (44 °C). Dozens of other cities had daily record high temperatures, including Shreveport, Louisiana (104 °F (40 °C)), Little Rock, Arkansas (105 °F (41 °C)), and Memphis, Tennessee (103 °F (39 °C)). The heat began to spread northward, with St. Louis and Kansas City, Missouri, seeing daily high records.

On June 26, Nebraska set a new monthly record high as it hit 114 °F (46 °C) in Franklin.

On June 29, it was 110 °F (43 °C) in both Saint John, Kentucky, and Etowah, Tennessee, and 111 °F (44 °C) in Seymour, Indiana; these temperatures set new monthly record highs for each state. This day was particularly brutal, with many areas across the South and Midwest reporting record highs for the month. Springfield, Illinois, hit 103 °F (39 °C) falling just short of the 104 °F (40 °C) record set in 1934. Galesburg, Illinois, hit 102 °F (39 °C) and Lexington, Kentucky, hit 104 °F (40 °C) which remains their hottest temperature ever recorded in June.

== July 1936 ==
July started off relatively mild in many areas, with many areas in the Midwest seeing highs in the upper-80s to low-90s. However, areas in the Central Great Plains saw temperatures in the 100s with Topeka, Kansas; Omaha, Nebraska; and other locations seeing daily record highs. On Independence Day, July 4, this all quickly changed.

=== Heat dome forms over Midwest ===
On July 4, multiple areas centered around the Central Midwest saw temperatures spike into the 100s. Peoria, Illinois, reached 106 °F (41 °C), Sioux City, Iowa, hit 111 °F (44 °C) (their highest temperature on record), Des Moines, Iowa, hit 109 °F (43 °C) (falling one degree short of the record), Springfield, Illinois, hit 105 °F (41 °C), and Kansas City, Missouri, hit 108 °F (42 °C). All these areas saw their hottest Independence Day on record. That night, temperatures would only fall into the 70's.

On July 5, the heat persisted in these areas while spreading to others. Areas in Eastern Iowa had highs in the low to mid 100s, with Burlington, Iowa, hitting 108 °F (42 °C) for the second day in a row. In Bismarck, North Dakota, the temperature hit 106 °F (41 °C) and in Aberdeen, South Dakota, it hit 108 °F (42 °C).

On July 6, Steele, North Dakota, hit 121 °F (49 °C), the highest temperature ever recorded in North Dakota. This occurred 5 months after the record low of −60 °F (−51 °C) was set in the state. Fargo and Bismarck both hit 114 °F (46 °C). In Moorhead, Minnesota, the record high of 113 °F (45 °C) was set. The heat continued to spread, with Rockford, Illinois, hitting 102 °F (39 °C), and Minneapolis, Minnesota, and Grand Forks, North Dakota, hitting 104 °F (40 °C) respectively.

On July 7, the heat spread to the Great Lakes area. Milwaukee, Wisconsin, hit 98 °F (37 °C), Madison, Wisconsin, hit 102 °F (39 °C), Green Bay, Wisconsin, hit 103 °F (39 °C), Duluth, Minnesota, hit 100 °F (38 °C), and Kalamazoo, Michigan, hit 101 °F (38 °C). The heat spread south, with Evansville, Indiana, hitting 106 °F (41 °C), and Lexington, Kentucky, hitting 101 °F (38 °C).

On July 8, heat began to creep back into the Northeastern United States, with some areas having highs in the 80s and 90s. Elsewhere the heat dome expanded more with Indianapolis, and Fort Wayne, Indiana, hitting 104 °F (40 °C) respectively. South Bend hit 106 °F (41 °C) (their second day above 100), and Louisville, Kentucky, hit 103 °F (39 °C). Flint, Michigan, hit 108 °F (42 °C), breaking the record.

On July 9, 1936, temperatures spiked, with many all-time record highs being set in both the Great Lakes and Northeast United States. The recap of temperatures are as follows.

- Rockford, IL: 101 °F (38 °C)
- Pittsburgh, PA: 101 °F (38 °C)
- Syracuse, NY: 102 °F (39 °C)
- Rochester, NY: 102 °F (39 °C)
- Detroit, MI: 102 °F (39 °C)
- Philadelphia, PA: 103 °F (39 °C)
- Albany, NY: 103 °F (39 °C)
- Baltimore, MD: 103 °F (39 °C)
- Scranton, PA: 103 °F (39 °C)
- Allentown, PA: 104 °F (40 °C)
- Washington DC: 104 °F (40 °C)
- Johnstown, PA: 104 °F (40 °C)
- Columbus, OH: 105 °F (40.6 °C)
- Warren, OH: 105 °F (40.6 °C)
- Williamsport, PA: 106 °F (41.1 °C)
- Trenton, NJ: 106 °F (41.1 °C)
- Central Park, New York City: 106 °F (41.1 °C)

On July 10, the heat peaked in Mid-Atlantic and Northeast, with some areas setting all-time record highs in parts of the South and most of the Midwest. The recap is as follows.

- Atlanta, GA: 100 °F (37.8 °C)
- Pittsburgh PA: 101 °F (38.3 °C)
- Detroit, MI: 102 °F (38.9 °C)
- Grand Rapids, MI: 102 °F (38.9 °C)
- Central Park, New York City: 102 °F (38.9 °C)
- Rochester, NY: 102 °F (39 °C)
- Allentown, PA: 103 °F (39.4 °C)
- Youngstown, OH: 103 °F (39.4 °C)
- Philadelphia, PA: 104 °F (40.0 °C)
- Richmond, VA: 104 °F (40.0 °C)
- Washington DC: 105 °F (40.6 °C)
- Lynchburg, VA: 106 °F (41.1 °C)
- Rockford, IL: 106 °F (41.1 °C)
- Bowling Green, KY: 106 °F (41.1 °C)
- St. Cloud, MN: 106 °F (41.1 °C)
- Baltimore, MD: 107 °F (41.7 °C)
- Lexington, KY: 108 °F (42.2 °C)
- Xenia, OH: 108 °F (42.2 °C)
- Cumberland & Frederick, MD: 109 °F (42.8 °C)
- Runyon, NJ: 110 °F (43.3 °C)
- Phoenixville, PA: 111 °F (43.9 °C)
- Martinsburg, WV: 112 °F (44.4 °C)
- Aberdeen, SD: 114 °F (45.6 °C)

On July 11, the heat subsided in the Northeast, though highs were still in the 90s. The heat temporarily stopped spreading but was still heavily impacting areas with Bismarck, North Dakota, recording a low of only 83°.

On July 13, 1936, the heat spread south through the Great Plains, with Wichita, Kansas, reporting a high of 101 °F (38.3 °C), Fort Smith, Arkansas, hitting 106 °F (41.1 °C), Tulsa, Oklahoma, hitting 107 °F (41.7 °C), and Oklahoma City, Oklahoma, hitting 101 °F (38.3 °C). Elsewhere, temperatures began to significantly rise with multiple areas hitting above 110 °F (43.3 °C). The recap is as follows:

- Columbus, OH: 101 °F (38.3 °C)
- Detroit, MI: 102 °F (38.9 °C)
- Green Bay, WI: 104 °F (40.0 °C)
- Minneapolis, MN: 105 °F (40.6 °C)
- Alpena, MI: 106 °F (41.1 °C)
- Madison, WI: 106 °F (41.1 °C)
- Duluth, MN: 106 °F (41.1 °C)
- St. Cloud, MN: 107 °F (41.7 °C)
- Decatur, IL: 108 °F (42.2 °C)
- Grand Rapids, MI: 108 °F (42.2 °C)
- Evansville, IN: 108 °F (42.2 °C)
- Kalamazoo, MI: 109 °F (42.8 °C)
- Rockford, IL: 110 °F (43.3 °C)
- Saginaw, MI: 111 °F (43.9 °C)
- Eau Claire, WI: 111 °F (43.9 °C)
- Waterloo, IA: 112 °F (44.4 °C)
- Mt. Vernon, IL: 112 °F (44.4 °C)
- Mio, MI: 112 °F (44.4 °C)
- Henderson, KY: 113 °F (45.0 °C)
- Wisconsin Dells, WI: 114 °F (45.6 °C)

July 14, 1936 was the peak day of the heat wave for most areas with countless record-breaking temperatures broken across many areas. The records are as follows.

- Pittsburgh, PA: 102 °F (38.9 °C)
- Detroit, MI: 104 °F (40.0 °C)
- Springfield, MO: 104 °F (40.0 °C) (Later broken with 113 °F (45 °C) on July 14, 1954)
- Indianapolis, IN: 106 °F (41.1 °C) (tied July 22, 1901, and July 21, 1934)
- Columbus, OH: 106 °F (41.1 °C) (tied July 21, 1934)
- Cincinnati, OH: 106 °F (41.1 °C)
- Madison, WI: 107 °F (41.7 °C)
- Louisville, KY: 107 °F (41.7 °C)
- Kalamazoo, MI: 108 °F (42.2 °C)
- Minneapolis, MN: 108 °F (42.2 °C)
- Rochester, MN: 108 °F (42.2 °C)
- Xenia, OH: 108 °F (42.2 °C)
- St. Louis, MO: 108 °F (42.2 °C) (Later broken with 115 °F (46 °C) on July 14, 1954)
- Lima, OH: 109 °F (42.8 °C)
- Cedar Rapids, IA: 109 °F (42.8 °C)
- Dubuque, IA: 110 °F (43.3 °C)
- Terre Haute, IN: 110 °F (43.3 °C)
- Springfield, IL: 110 °F (43.3 °C) (Later broken with 112 °F (44 °C) on July 14, 1954)
- Decatur, IL: 110 °F (43.3 °C) (Later broken with 113 °F (45 °C) on July 14, 1954)
- Moline, IL: 111 °F (43.9 °C)
- Burlington, IA: 111 °F (43.9 °C)
- Rockford, IL: 112 °F (44.4 °C)
- Waterloo, IA: 112 °F (44.4 °C)
- Palestine, IL: 112 °F (44.4 °C) (Later broken with 114 °F (46 °C) on July 14, 1954)
- Mt. Vernon, IL: 114 °F (45.6 °C)
- Collegeville, IN: 116 °F (46.7 °C)

On July 15, temperatures finally began to decline over most areas while other isolated areas still saw heat still increase. Missouri hit an all-time high of 115 °F (46.1 °C) in Clinton, Missouri. Peoria, Illinois, hit 113 °F (45.0 °C) and Quincy hit 114 °F (45.6 °C), setting all-time records for those cities. Many Iowa cities tied the records set the previous day. Temperatures in the Great Plains continued to rise as a new heat wave began to develop.

=== Heat persists over the Great Plains ===
Although heat in the Midwest had begun to subside, heat had been building in the Great Plains over that period. It began on July 13 when there was a noticeable increase in temperatures but began to peak on July 14.

On July 14, the temperature climbed to 107 °F (42 °C) in Lincoln, Nebraska, after having 5 days of temperature's in the low 100s, though that night it would be the first time the temperature fell below 80 °F (27 °C) in a week. Norfolk, Nebraska, hit 105 °F (41 °C) and Omaha, Nebraska, hit 109 °F (43 °C). Further south, Topeka, Kansas, hit 108 °F (42 °C), and Kansas City, Missouri, hit 109 °F (43 °C). In Tulsa, Oklahoma, temperatures had been climbing the past couple days and hit 110 °F (43 °C) this day. This heat would persist into the next day before temperatures would fall noticeably on the 16th over the Central Great Plains.

On July 17, temperatures once again began to rise. Nebraska set a record high of 118 °F (48 °C) in Hartington, Nebraska. Sioux City, Iowa, and Sioux Falls, South Dakota, set record highs of 110 °F (43 °C). In Grand Island, Nebraska, it was 114 °F (46 °C), falling 2 degrees short of the record in 1934, while Hastings, Nebraska, would set a record of 115 °F (46 °C). It was 110 °F (43 °C) in Fort Smith, Arkansas.

On July 18, the heat would peak. Kansas and Oklahoma set record highs of 121 °F (49 °C) in Fredonia and 120 °F (49 °C) in Alva, respectively. Wichita, Kansas, hit 112 °F (44 °C), Salina, Kansas, hit 116 °F (47 °C), 110 °F (43 °C) in Topeka, Kansas, and 113 °F (45 °C) in Tulsa, Oklahoma (a record high for July). On July 19, Oklahoma's record would be tied in Altus.

=== Latter part of July ===
For many areas, temperatures would be relatively lower for the last part of the month. Most areas saw highs fall below 100 °F (38 °C) on July 20 and 21 for the first time in nearly 2 weeks. However, temperatures would rise back into the 100s over the Great Plains after this, though generally would not be as high as earlier in the month. The notable exceptions would be in Nebraska, Iowa and Kansas.

On July 24, Grand Island, Nebraska, broke their record high with a high 117 °F (47 °C). Hastings, Nebraska, set a new all-time high of 116 °F (47 °C). Both Kansas and Nebraska tied their all-time record highs in Alton and Minden, respectively just days after they were set.

On July 25, the temperature rose to a record high 115 °F (46 °C) in Lincoln, Nebraska, but would only fall to 91 °F (33 °C) that night. Outside of the Desert Southwest, this is one of the highest low temperatures ever recorded in the US. Omaha set a record high of 114 °F (46 °C), though had a low of 83 °F (28 °C). On the previous day, Grand Island, Nebraska, broke their record with a high 117 °F (47 °C). Des Moines, Iowa, would set their record high of 110 °F (43 °C) this day as well. Iowa set their record high of 117 °F (47 °C) in Atlantic and Logan.

== August 1936 and afterwards ==
August was the warmest month on record for five states. Texas, Arkansas, and Louisiana set all-time high records. Many experienced long stretches of daily maximum temperatures 100 °F (38 °C) or warmer. Drought conditions worsened in some locations. Other states were only slightly warmer than average.

The heat wave and drought largely ended in September, although many states were still drier and warmer than average. Many farmers' summer harvests were destroyed. Grounds and lawns remained parched. Seasonable temperatures returned in the autumn.

Summer 1936 remained the warmest summer on record in the USA since official records began in 1895, until 2021. February 1936 was the coldest February on record, and 5 of the 12 months were below average, leaving the full year 1936 at just above the average.

== Effects ==
As many as 5,000 heat-related deaths were reported in the United States, and 780 direct and 400 indirect deaths in Canada.

Nearly 5,000 people suffered from heat stroke and heat exhaustion, particularly the elderly. Air conditioning was in the early stages of development and was therefore absent from houses and commercial buildings. Many of the deaths occurred in high-population-density areas of Chicago, Detroit, St. Louis, Milwaukee, Cleveland, Toronto, and other urban areas. Farmers across the continent saw crop failure, causing corn and wheat prices to rise quickly. Droughts and heat waves were common in the 1930s. The 1930s (the Dust Bowl years) are remembered as the driest and warmest decade for the United States, and the summer of 1936 featured the most widespread and destructive heat wave to occur in the Americas in centuries.

With few air conditioners in service, but many electric ranges, electricity consumption was affected in an opposite way to heat waves of the mid-20th Century or later. People did much less cooking while under near record or true record heat, so demand for electricity was reduced.

== See also ==
- Dust Bowl
- 1936 North American cold wave
