= Anthony Buttitta =

American dramatist

Anthony Buttitta (July 26, 1907 - August 11, 2004) was an American playwright. He was born in Monroe, Louisiana to wealthy educated parents, recent immigrants from Sicily, Italy. He published his first plays and stories in the later 1920s as an undergraduate at Louisiana State Normal College and the University of Texas. Subsequently, at the University of North Carolina, he was one of the group of friends who founded the avant garde Intimate Bookshop and the literary magazine Contempo (1931–34). The magazine led to him meeting and corresponding with such writers as Sherwood Anderson, Ezra Pound, George Bernard Shaw, and William Faulkner. In 1932 he edited a special Contempo issue devoted to Faulkner's work, now much coveted by Faulkner collectors.

Buttitta died on August 11, 2004, in Sardinia, Italy, at the age of 97.
