= Natural Resources Conservation Service =

Agency of the U.S. Department of Agriculture

Agency overview
- Formed: September 13, 1933
- Preceding agency: Soil Conservation Service, Soil Erosion Service
- Headquarters: Washington, D.C.
- Employees: Approx 11,000
- Agency executive: Colton L. Buckley, Chief
- Parent agency: Department of Agriculture
- Website: www.nrcs.usda.gov

Natural Resources Conservation Service (NRCS), formerly known as the Soil Conservation Service (SCS), is an agency of the United States Department of Agriculture (USDA) that provides technical assistance to farmers and other private landowners and managers.

Its name was changed in 1994 during the presidency of Bill Clinton to reflect its broader mission. It is a relatively small agency, currently comprising about 12,000 employees. Its mission is to improve, protect, and conserve natural resources on private lands through a cooperative partnership with state and local agencies. While its primary focus has been agricultural lands, it has made many technical contributions to soil surveying, classification, and water quality improvement. One example is the Conservation Effects Assessment Project (CEAP), set up to quantify the benefits of agricultural conservation efforts promoted and supported by programs in the Farm Security and Rural Investment Act of 2002 (2002 Farm Bill). NRCS is the leading agency in this project.

== History ==
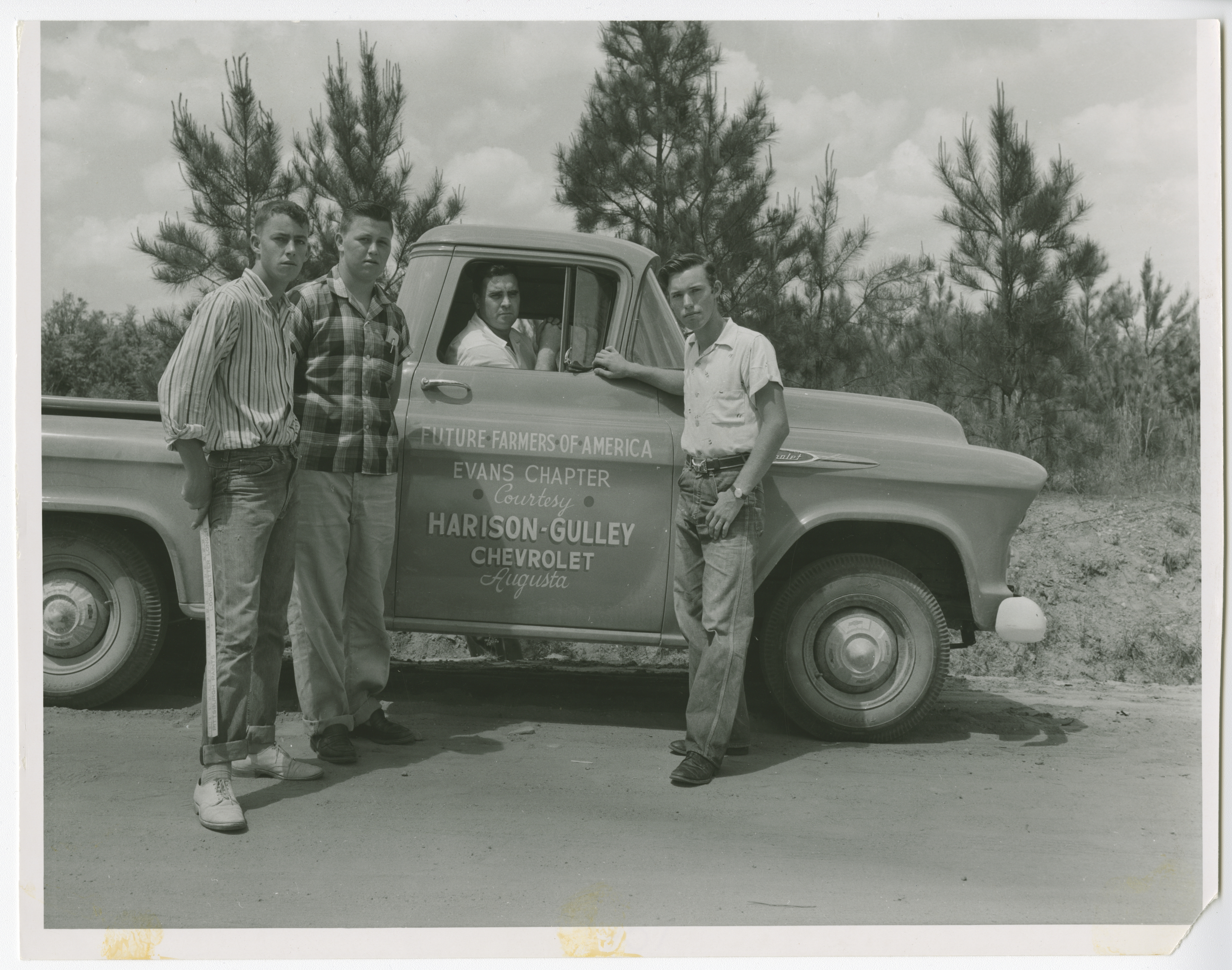
Members of the Little River Soil Conservation District, Columbia County, Georgia, 1957

The agency was founded largely through the efforts of Hugh Hammond Bennett, a soil conservation pioneer who worked for the Department of Agriculture from 1903 to 1952. Bennett's motivation was based on his knowledge of the detrimental effects of soil erosion and the impacts on U.S lands that led to the Dust Bowl in the 1930s. On September 13, 1933, the Soil Erosion Service was formed in the Department of the Interior, with Bennett as chief. The service was transferred to the Department of Agriculture on March 23, 1935, and was shortly thereafter combined with other USDA units to form the Soil Conservation Service by the Soil Conservation and Domestic Allotment Act of 1935.

The SCS was in charge of 500 Civilian Conservation Corps camps between 1933 and 1942. The primary purpose of these camps was erosion control. Since 1980 the agency has attempted to quantify the total soil erosion loss which annually matches the Dust Bowl losses during the height of its severity. In the 1980s, there were around 3,000 local Soil Conservation Service districts throughout the United States, each with elected executive boards. These districts provided financial as well as technical support, such as assistance inventorying natural resources, to land owners in their conservation efforts upon request.

Bennett continued as chief until his retirement in 1952. As part of the Federal Crop Insurance Reform and Department of Agriculture Reorganization Act of 1994, the agency was renamed the Natural Resources Conservation Service during the tenure of Chief Paul Johnson.

== Programs and services ==
NRCS offers technical and financial assistance to farmers and ranchers. The financial assistance is authorized by the "Farm Bill", a law that is renewed every five years. The 2014 Farm Bill consolidated 23 programs into 15. NRCS offers these services to private land owners, conservation districts, tribes, and other types of organizations. NRCS also collects and shares information on the nation's soil, water, air, and plants.

=== Farm bill ===
The "Conservation" title of the Farm Bill (Title II in the 2014 bill) provides the funding to agricultural producers, and a conservation plan must be included. All of these programs are voluntary. The main programs include:

==== Environmental Quality Incentives Program ====
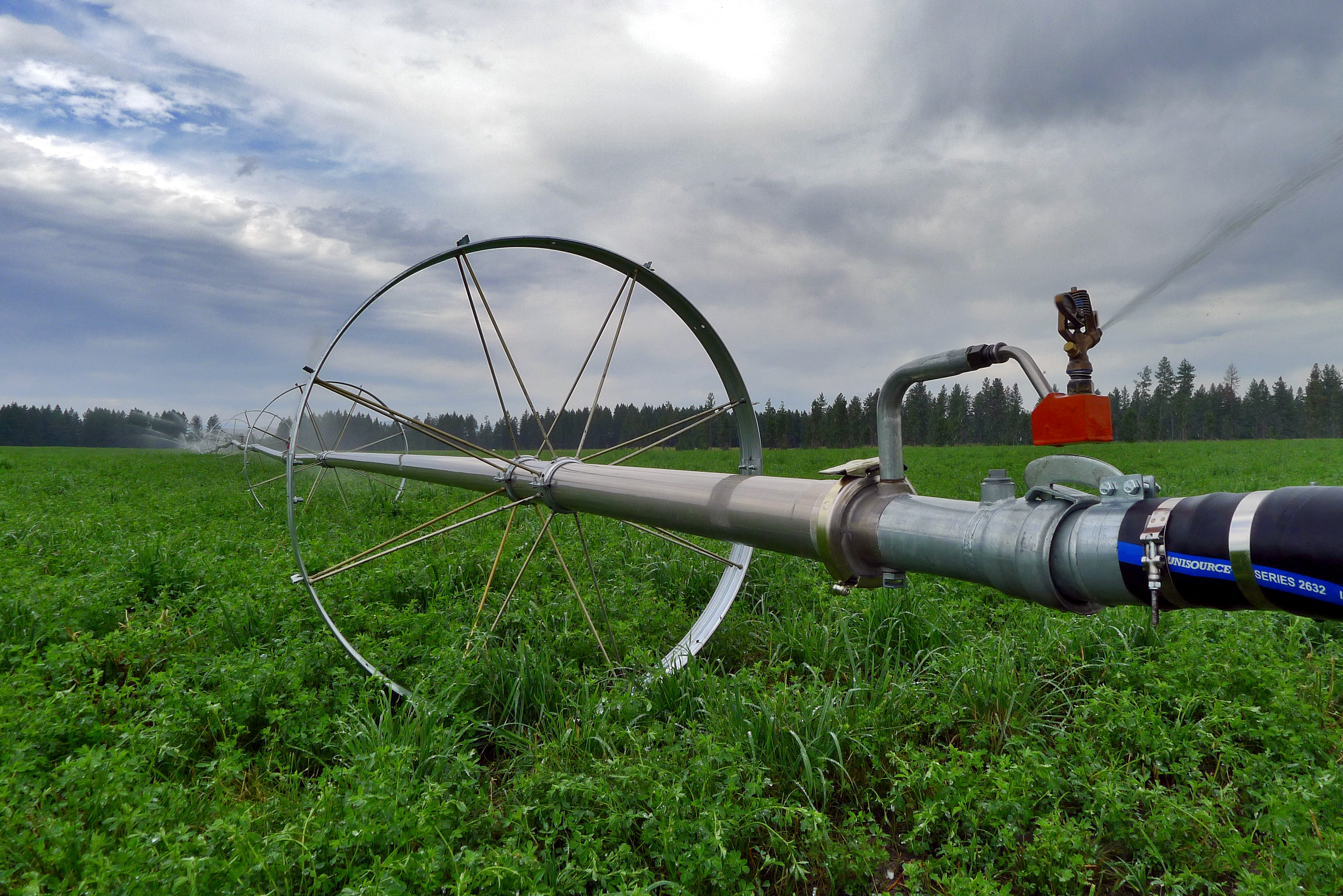
An alfalfa farm in Montana implementing an Irrigation Water Management Plan with assistance from the Environmental Quality Incentives Program

The Environmental Quality Incentives Program (EQIP) provides assistance to landowners to help them improve their soil, water and related natural resources, including grazing lands, wetlands, and wildlife habitat. Congress established the program in the 1996 farm bill to provide primarily cost-sharing assistance, but also technical and educational assistance, aimed at promoting production and environmental quality, and optimizing environmental benefits.

==== Conservation Stewardship Program ====
The Conservation Stewardship Program (CSP), established by the 2008 Farm Bill, is targeted to producers who maintain a higher level of environmental stewardship.

==== Regional Conservation Partnership Program ====
Regional Conservation Partnership Program (RCPP) consolidated four programs from the 2008 Farm Bill. It aims at more regional or watershed scale projects, rather than individual farms and ranches.

==== Agricultural Conservation Easement Program ====
The Agricultural Conservation Easement Program (ACEP) was another consolidation effort of the 2014 Farm Bill, which includes the former Grasslands Reserve Program, Farm and Ranch Lands Protection Program, and Wetlands Reserve Program. ACEP includes technical and financial help to maintain or improve land for agriculture or environmental benefits, including the purchase of conservation easements.

==== Healthy Forests Reserve Program ====
(HFRP) Landowners volunteer to restore and protect forests in 30 or 10 year contracts. This program hands assisting funds to participants. The objectives of HFRP are to:

1. Promote the recovery of endangered and threatened species under the Endangered Species Act (ESA)
2. Improve plant and animal biodiversity
3. Enhance carbon sequestration

=== NRCS National Ag Water Management Team ===
(AGWAM) Serves 10 states in the Midwest United States in helping to reduce nitrate levels in soil due to runoff from fertilized farmland. The project began in 2010 and initially focused on the Mississippi Basin area. The main goal of the project is to implement better methods of managing water drainage from agricultural uses, in place of letting the water drain naturally as it had done in the past. In October 2011, The National "Managing Water, Harvesting Results" Summit was held to promote the drainage techniques used in hopes of people adopting them nationwide.

==== Snow Survey and Water Supply Forecasting ====
Includes water supply forecasts, reservoirs, and the Surface Water Supply Index (SWSI) for Alaska and other Western states. NRCS agents collect data from snowpack and mountain sites to predict spring runoff and summer streamflow amounts. These predictions are used in decision making for agriculture, wildlife management, construction and development, and several other areas. These predictions are available within the first five days of each month from January to June.

=== Conservation Technical Assistance Program ===
(CTA) Is a blanket program which involves conservation efforts on soil and water conservation, as well as management of agricultural wastes, erosion, and general longterm sustainability. NRCS and related agencies work with landowners, communities, or developers to protect the environment. Also serve to guide people to comply with acts such as the Highly Erodible Land, Wetland (Swampbuster), and Conservation Compliance Provisions acts. The CTA can also cover projects by state, local, and federal governments.

=== Gulf of Mexico Initiative ===
Is a program to assist gulf bordering states (Alabama, Florida, Louisiana, Mississippi, and Texas) improve water quality and use sustainable methods of farming, fishing, and other industry. The program will deliver up to 50 million dollars over 2011–2013 to apply these sustainable methods, as well as wildlife habitat management systems that do not hinder agricultural productivity, and prevent future over use of water resources to protect native endangered species.

=== International programs ===
The NRCS (formerly SCS) has been involved in soil and other conservation issues internationally since the 1930s. The main bulk of international programs focused on preventing soil erosion by sharing techniques known to the United States with other areas. NRCS sends staff to countries worldwide to conferences to improve knowledge of soil conservation. There is also international technical assistance programs similar to programs implemented in the United States. There are long-term technical assistance programs in effect with one or more NRCS staff residing in the country for a minimum of one year. There are currently long-term assistance programs on every continent. Short-term technical assistance is also available on a two-week basis.

These programs are to encourage local landowners and organizations to participate in the conservation of natural resources on their land, and lastly, landscape planning has a goal to solve problems dealing with natural resource conservation with the help of the community in order to reach a desired future outcome.

== Technical resources ==
=== Soil ===
There is a long history of the federal Soil Survey Program, including federal scientists and cooperators working through the National Cooperative Soil Survey (NCSS). Soil survey products include the Web Soil Survey, the NCSS Characterization Database and many investigative reports and journal articles. In 2015 NRCS began broad support of soil health, which incorporates less tillage and more cover crops to reduce erosion and improve the diversity of the soil. Information is maintained in the Soil Survey Geographic database (SSURGO) dataset.

=== Water ===
Water pollution related to agricultural practices is addressed in several NRCS programs which provide financial and technical assistance. Nutrient pollution caused by excessive nitrogen and phosphorus in farm surface runoff depletes oxygen levels and creates algal blooms in lakes, streams and rivers, harming aquatic life. Excessive sedimentation and pathogens from agricultural pollution can also have major impacts on water quality, and some NRCS projects focus on these problems with land owners and their water systems.

==== Water management ====
The practice of water management focuses on the efficiently controlling the flow of water while causing the least amount of damage to life and property. This helps to provide protection in high risk areas from flooding. Irrigation management is the most efficient way to use and recycle water resources for land owners and farmers. Drainage management is the manipulation of the sub-surface drainage networks in order to properly disperse the water to the correct geographical areas. The NRCS engineering vision is constantly making improvements to irrigation systems in a way that incorporates every aspect of water restoration.

==== Water quality ====
The Natural Resources Conservation Service (NRCS) employs specialists to analyze water resources from various sources. They work in many areas such as: hydrology and hydraulics, stream restoration, wetlands, agriculture, agronomy, animal waste management, pest control, salinity, irrigation, and nutrients in water.

==== Watershed program ====
Under watershed programs the NRCS works with states, local governments, and tribes by providing funding and resources in order to help restore and also benefit from the programs. They provide: watershed protection, flood mitigation, water quality improvement, soil erosion reduction, irrigation, sediment control, fish and wildlife enhancement, wetland and wetland function creation and restoration, groundwater recharge, easements, wetland and floodplain conservation easements, hydropower, watershed dam rehabilitation.

=== Plants and animals ===
Plants and animals play a role in the health of our ecosystems. A delicate balance exists between relationships of plants and animals. If an animal is introduced to an ecosystem, that is not native to the region, it could destroy plants or other animals. Also, if a plant ends up in an area shouldn't be, it could have adverse effects on the wildlife eating it. NRCS protects the plants and animals because they provide us with food, materials for shelter, fuel to keep us warm, and air to breathe. Without functioning ecosystems we wouldn't have things mentioned above. NRCS provides guidance to assist conservationists and landowners with enhancing plant and animal populations as well as helping them deal with invasive species.

==== Fish and wildlife ====
NRCS for years has been working toward restoration, creation, enhancement, and maintenance for aquatic life on the nearly 70% of land that is privately owned in order to keep the habitats and wildlife protected. NRCS with a science-based approach, provides equipment to wildlife and fish management. They also do this for landowners who qualify .

==== Insects and pollinators ====
Pollination by insects plays a huge role in the production of food crop and flowering plants. Without pollinators searching for nectar and pollen for food the plants would not produce a seed that will create another plant. NRCS sees the importance of this process so they are taking measures to increase the declining number of pollinators. There are many resources provided from the NRCS that will help any individual do their part in conservation of these important insects. Such as Backyard Conservation which tells an individual exactly how to help by just creating a small habitat in minutes. There are many others such as: Plants for pollinators, pollinators habitat in pastures, pollinator value of NRCS plant releases in conservation planting, plant materials publications relating to insects and pollinators, PLANTS database: NRCS pollinator documents. All of these are valuable resources that any individual can take advantage of.

==== Invasive species and pests ====
Invasive species cause America's reduction in economic productivity and ecological decline. NRCS works in collaboration with the plant materials centers scattered throughout the country in order to get a handle on the invasive species of plants. These centers scout out the plants and take measures to control and eradicate them from the particular area.

==== Livestock ====
Livestock management is an area of interest for the NRCS because if not maintained valuable resources such as food, wools, and leather would not be available. The proper maintenance of livestock can also improve soil and water resources by providing a waste management system so that run off and erosion is not a problem. The NRCS provides financial assistance to land owners with grazing land and range land that is used by livestock in order to control the run off of waste into fresh water systems and prevent soil erosion.

==== Plants ====
NRCS offers resources to individuals interested in conserving plants including databases full of information and financial assistance. The plant materials program, Plant materials centers, Plant materials specialists, PLANTS database, National Plant Data Team (NPDT) are used collectively to keep ecosystems healthy and in one piece.

== Supported organizations ==
- Great Basin Plant Materials Center based in Fallon, Nevada.

Established in 2006, the GBVPMC serves Nevada, California, and parts of Utah and Oregon. The center's main purpose is to combat the damage done by invasive plant species in the area, which have greatly damaged ecosystems in the Great Basin. They also aid in restoring ecosystems damaged by fires, climate change, drought, or other natural disasters. The centers provide native plants to help restore these damaged areas. They also work on developing plant organisms and technologies that are suited for the dry, high salt content soil of the area.

- National Association of Conservation Districts

(NACD) A non-profit agency that serves 3,000 conservation districts across the United States. There are about 17,000 individuals who serve on the governing boards of conservation districts. Local conservation districts work with landowners to help manage land and water resources. The mission of NACD is to provide leadership and a unified voice for natural resource conservation in the United States. The NACD grew in the 1930s from a statewide operation in Oklahoma, and many independent districts, to a unified National organization in 1946.

== See also ==
- Arlen Lancaster
- Conservation technical assistance
- Honey Hollow Watershed
- Resource Management System
- Title 7 of the Code of Federal Regulations
