= 1936 North American cold wave =

Weather event in North America

The 1936 North American cold wave ranks among the most intense cold waves in the recorded history of North America. The Midwestern United States and the Canadian Prairies were hit the hardest. Only the Southwestern United States and California largely escaped its effects. The cold wave was related to a highly negative North Atlantic Oscillation event during that winter driving cold Arctic air into most of North America.

February 1936 was the coldest February on record in the contiguous U.S., narrowly eclipsing February 1899. It also was the coldest month ever in Nebraska, North Dakota, and South Dakota.

The meteorological winter (December through February) of 1935/36 was the coldest on record for Iowa, Minnesota, North Dakota, and South Dakota.

This winter was much colder than the immediately preceding winters. 1930 through 1934 had each seen exceptionally mild winters in substantial parts of the United States: 1930/31 in the northern Great Plains; 1931/32 in the mid- and south-Atlantic states, the eastern north central states, and the eastern south central states; 1932/33 in New England, and 1933/34 in the Mountain and Pacific states. In the northern plains, the Februaries of 1925, 1926, 1927, 1930, 1931, and 1935 are among the 25 warmest Februaries between 1895 and 2017, although 1929 had the third-coldest February of all-time.

Despite a mild March over most areas east of the Rocky Mountains, the six months from October 1935 to March 1936 were the fifth-coldest on record over the contiguous U.S.

== November and December 1935 ==
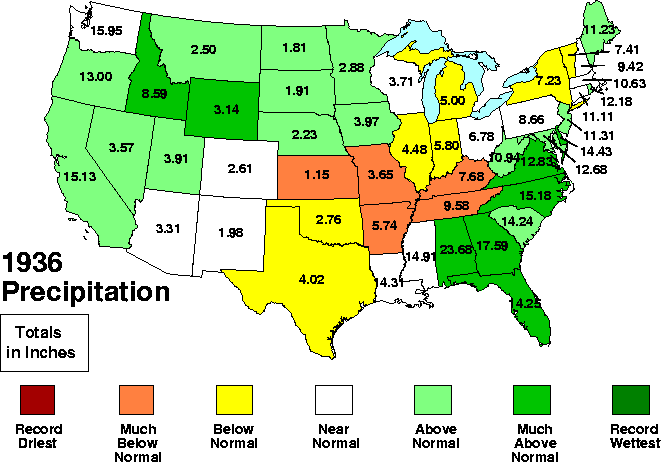
Winter 1935 (December 1935 – February 1936) Precipitation, in inches. Record wettest and driest is based on a 112 yr period of records, 1895–2006.

The 1935/36 cold wave began in the plains states in November, when temperatures were well below normal in many areas west of the Mississippi River. November 1935 was one of the coldest Novembers on record for Idaho (fourth coldest), Oregon (sixth coldest), Washington (seventh coldest), and North Dakota (seventh coldest).

During December, cold weather spread to the eastern half of the U.S., where most places were much below average. Florida, Georgia, and South Carolina had their second-coldest Decembers of all-time, with Florida averaging 50.8 °F (10.4 °C), Georgia 39.3 °F (4.1 °C), and South Carolina 37.5 °F (3.1 °C). British Columbia and Montana were however significantly warmer than average.

== January 1936 ==
The month began with a mild spell in the eastern states, but by the nineteenth a large blizzard-like storm covered the eastern half of the country, and would cause two deaths in New Jersey and two in the Catskill Mountains. The storm produced heavy snow and blocked most roads in the Appalachian Mountains. Snow was a contributing factor to several highway accidents that killed up to 100 people.

The cold continued during the following weeks. The sea froze partially as far south as Chesapeake Bay. From January 25 to 28, the Mid-Atlantic had its coldest January temperatures in eighteen years, with Washington, D. C. averaging 14 °F or −10 °C. High winds in some locations caused wind chills below −85 °F or −65 °C. In Ohio and the Centralia district of Illinois, the cold destroyed the peach crop, whilst defective heaters caused numerous dangerous fires in Minnesota.

North Dakota had its fifth-coldest January of all-time with an average temperature of −6.9 °F (−21.6 °C).

The coldest temperature recorded in North America during the cold wave was −75 °F (−59.4 °C) in Fort Resolution, Northwest Territories, Canada on January 8, 18, and 21.

== February 1936 ==
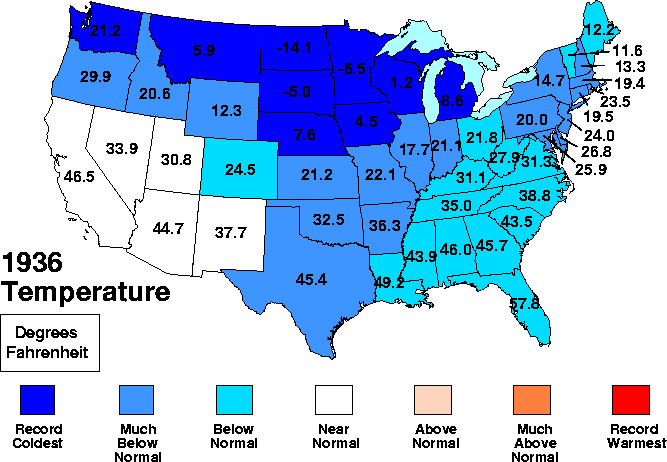
February 1936 US Temperature, in degrees Fahrenheit. Record warmest and coldest is based on a 112 yr period of records, 1895–2006.

February was by far the coldest month of this severe winter. Nebraska, North Dakota, and South Dakota experienced their coldest month on record. Two states recorded their coldest temperatures on record: McIntosh, South Dakota sank to −58 °F or −50 °C, and Parshall, North Dakota hit −60 °F or −51.1 °C. At Devil's Lake, North Dakota, the average temperature for five weeks ending in February was −21 °F (−29.4 °C).

Skis had to be used in rescue operations as a succession of snowstorms hit the Pacific Northwest states and much of the nation east of the Continental Divide. By the middle of the month, all schools in the Midwest, Great Plains, and Pacific Northwest were closed by deep snowdrifts. Health care was affected by a shortage of serum. Many remote South Dakota towns did not have outside contact for several weeks, At the peak of the cold wave, only two days of supplies were in inventory at many stores in the plains states. As far south as Richmond, Virginia, rivers were completely ice-bound. Subsequent thaws accompanied by heavy rain over the southern states led to flooding.

In Canada away from the Atlantic Ocean, temperatures averaged as much as 30 °F (17 °C) below normal. At the Saskatoon airport, the temperature did not rise above 0 °F (−17.8 °C) from February 2 through February 20. A temperature of −63 °F (−52.8 °C) was reached in Sceptre, Saskatchewan.

== March 1936 ==
In the final week of February, a thaw finally came to the nation. Temperatures rose above freezing for the first time in many weeks. Fargo, North Dakota reached 32 °F or 0 °C on March 1 for the first time since December 14, 1935. The warming led, however, to avalanches in the Pacific Northwest, where three people were killed on Snoqualmie Pass on February 24.

Above average to near average temperatures were recorded throughout the U.S. in March, except for the Pacific Northwest. The melting of the heavy winter snowfalls and thawing of the ground, along with the wettest March on record in the northeastern states led to record floods in most of the region's rivers, especially on smaller tributary streams.

== See also ==
- North Atlantic oscillation
- 1936 North American heat wave
- National Centers for Environmental Information
