= Environmental Quality Incentives Program =

United States government program

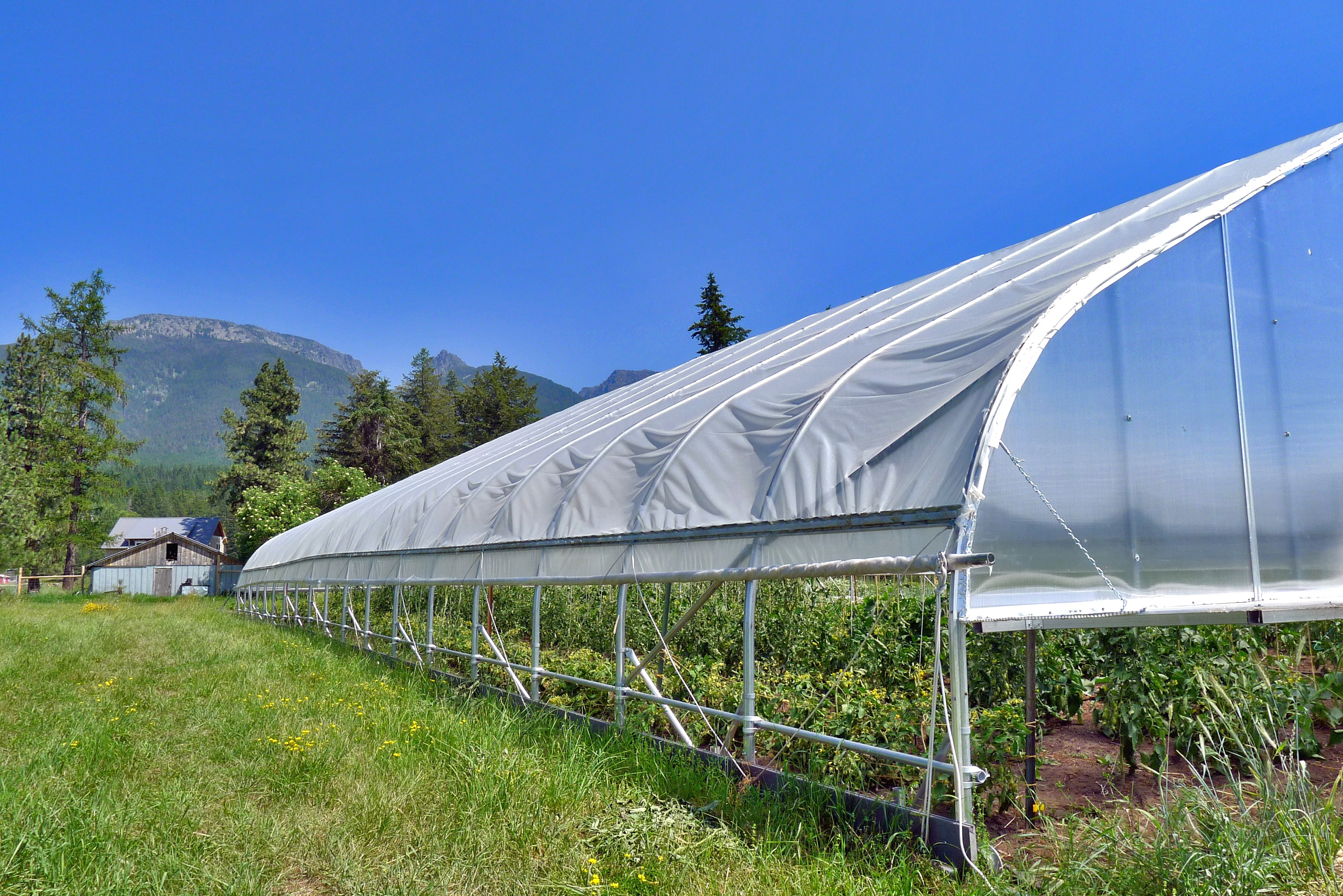
An organic vegetable farm in Montana participating in EQIP

The Environmental Quality Incentives Program (EQIP) is a United States government program designed to assist farmers in improving environmental quality, particularly water quality and soil conservation. Congress established the program in the 1996 farm bill to provide primarily cost-sharing assistance, but also technical and educational assistance, aimed at promoting production and environmental quality, and optimizing environmental benefits.

The program replaced the Agricultural Conservation Program, the Water Quality Incentives Program, the Great Plains Conservation Program, and the Colorado River Basin Salinity Control Program. EQIP was reauthorized in the 2002 farm bill at $0.4 billion in mandatory spending in FY2002 and rising to $1.3 billion in FY2007. The funding each year is to be divided, with 60% targeted to environmental concerns associated with livestock production and the remainder to crop production. Producers enter into contracts of 1 to 10 years. Participants can receive no more than $450,000 between FY2002 and FY2007. Two new sub-programs were created. One provides matching grants for innovative conservation efforts, such as using market systems to reduce pollution and promoting carbon sequestration in soil. The second is the Ground and Surface Water Conservation Program (GSWP).

The program's financial aid to farmers in purchasing more efficient irrigation equipment was intended to conserve water. The assistance has had the unintended consequence of increasing water use and lowering water tables in the Great Plains as additional land was brought into cultivation to use the water that was "saved".

Congress added features to the program in the 2018 Farm Bill.

EQIP is administered by the Natural Resources Conservation Service in the Department of Agriculture.

== Historical programs ==
=== Great Plains Conservation Program ===
The Great Plains Conservation Program (GPCP), initiated in 1957, provided cost share and technical assistance to apply conservation on entire farms in 10 Great Plains states from the Dakotas and Montana to Texas and New Mexico. Contracts were limited to $35,000. At the end of 1995, over 6,800 farms in 558 counties with 20 million acres (81,000 km^{2}) were participating. It was replaced by the Environmental Quality Incentives Program (EQIP) in the 1996 farm bill (P.L. 104-127).

=== Agricultural Conservation Program ===
The Agricultural Conservation Program (ACP) was a United States government program administered by the Farm Service Agency. It was the first conservation cost-sharing program, established by Congress in 1936 in the Soil Conservation and Domestic Allotment Act. The ACP and paid farmers up to $3,500 per year as an incentive to install approved practices for soil conservation and to protect water quality. The ACP was terminated in the 1996 farm bill and replaced by a new Environmental Quality Incentives Program (EQIP).

== Practices Eligible for Funding ==
The EQIP covers up to 75 percent of costs incurred and 100 percent of income foregone for implementing eligible conservation practices for awardees. There are a variety of conservation practices that are eligible for funding under EQIP.

=== Grazing ===
Managed rotational grazing, a method of livestock production in which animals are moved between pastures in order to let pastureland rest, is included as an eligible practice under EQIP. Specifically, the most common managed grazing practices that may receive funding include: design plans and identification of infrastructure and materials needs such as fencing, planting, and water systems; prescribed grazing systems that improve or maintain water quality, plant communities, watersheds, or wildlife cover; and mechanical treatment to improve soil and plant conditions. At the national level, 50 percent of EQIP funding is reserved for livestock operations.

=== Ground and Surface Water Conservation Program ===
The Ground and Surface Water Conservation Program (GSWCP) is a component of Environmental Quality Incentives Program (EQIP) enacted in the 2002 farm bill (P.L. 107-171, Sec. 2301) to improve irrigation and water use efficiency, and reduce water use by agriculture. Mandatory funding from the Commodity Credit Corporation (CCC) starts at $25 million in FY2002, and increases to $60 million annually between FY2004 and FY2007. In addition, $50 million is to go to the Klamath Basin in Oregon and California to carry out water conservation activities.
