= Howard Finnell =

- Born: October 27, 1894; Oakley, Mississippi, US
- Died: September 7, 1960 (aged 65); California, US
- Occupations: Agronomist and erosion specialist
- Known for: Pioneered methods to combat soil erosion during the Dust Bowl

Henry Howard Finnell (October 27, 1894 – September 7, 1960) was an agronomist and erosion specialist who pioneered methods to combat soil erosion during the Dust Bowl that afflicted North America in the 1930s.

He was born in Oakley, Hinds County, Mississippi, the son of Jesse and Jerusha Finnell. When he was a child, his family moved to Indian Territory. He graduated from Oklahoma Agricultural and Mechanical College (OAMC) in 1917 with a B.Sc.

He was foreman of the OAMC Research Station from 1917 to 1920 and director of the Panhandle A&M Experiment Station from 1923 to 1934. He made a series of studies and published reports outlining more efficient methods of utilizing water in the semi-arid southern Great Plains region, such as terracing and contour plowing. His findings were mostly ignored until the prolonged drought of the 1930s led to the Dust Bowl. In 1934, the federal Soil Erosion Service established the Dalhart Wind Erosion Control Project, and placed Finnell in charge.

The next year, he was sent to head the Region Six office of the Soil Conservation Service (the successor of the Soil Erosion Service) in either Amarillo or Dalhart, Texas. He was now responsible for conservation efforts for the entire Dust Bowl. His ideas were put to the test and proved extremely successful. By May 1936, nearly 40,000 farmers had adopted his methods, "and 5.5 million acres were under new terraced and contour-listed cultivation. At the end of 1937, despite the persistent dust storms, the amount of dangerously eroded land had been reduced by more than half." He remained regional director until 1942.

Finnell continued to study wind erosion and land use for the government until his retirement in 1959. He died the following year at his home in California.
