= Soil and Water Conservation Society =

The Soil and Water Conservation Society (SWCS) is a professional and scientific membership society. The mission of the organization is to foster the science and art of natural resource management for sustainability. The society was formed in 1945 and changed its name from the Soil Conservation Society of America (SCSA) to the Soil and Water Conservation Society in 1987. The SWCS publishes the bimonthly peer-reviewed Journal of Soil and Water Conservation.

== History ==
The Soil Conservation Society of America (SCSA) was formed in 1943, "...founded by a small group of soil conservation leaders ... they set about the task of creating an association through which conservationists could increase their efficiency and effectiveness as leaders, improve their vocational competencies, and utilize their combined talents and influence in solving the problems facing conservation programs." The professional and scientific membership society changed its name to the Soil and Water Conservation Society (SWCS) in 1987. The mission of the organization is to foster the science and art of natural resource management for sustainability.

The history of SWCS was first recorded in the minutes on February 16, 1943, during a meeting held in Washington D.C. Individuals present included: H.H. Bennett, R.H. Musser, A.E. McClymonds, J.H. Christ, J.C. Dykes, A.L. Patrick, Glenn Rule, M.L. Nichols, L.P. Merrill, C.E. Luker, T.S. Buie, and A.E. Jones. [Previously, a meeting had been held in Chicago on November 11, 1941, where Bennett, Musser, McClymonds, and Christ, the "original four," proposed the organization.

On January 1, 1952, SWCS opened its first national office with a full-time staff.
