= Soil Conservation and Domestic Allotment Act of 1936 =

United States federal law

- Other short titles: Soil Conservation and Domestic Allotment Act act
- Long title: An Act to promote the conservation and profitable use of agricultural land resources by temporary Federal aid to farmers and by providing for a permanent policy of Federal aid to States for such purposes.
- Enacted by: the 74th United States Congress
- Effective: February 29, 1936

Citations
- Public law: Pub. L. 74–461
- Statutes at Large: 49 Stat. 1148

Legislative history
- Introduced in the Senate as S. 3780 on January 30, 1936; Committee consideration by Senate Agriculture and Forestry, House Agriculture; Passed the Senate on February 15, 1936 (56-20); Passed the House on February 21, 1936 (267-97); Reported by the joint conference committee on February 24, 1936; agreed to by the House on February 27, 1936 (Agreed) and by the Senate on February 27, 1936 (Agreed); Signed into law by President Franklin D. Roosevelt on February 29, 1936

The Soil Conservation and Domestic Allotment Act Pub. L. 74–461, enacted February 29, 1936) is a United States federal law that allowed the government to pay farmers to reduce production so as to conserve soil and prevent erosion.

== Legislative history ==
The Act was passed in response to the Supreme Court's declaration that the Agricultural Adjustment Act (AAA) was unconstitutional. These two acts were passed as legislation in an attempt to cut crop and livestock surplus. Originally, Congress enacted the Soil Conservation Act of 1935 Pub. L. 74–46, 49 Stat. 163 on April 27, 1935 in an attempt to address farm erosion problems by bringing within its policy and purposes, the improvements and preservation of national soil resources. During the second session of the 74th Congress, the U.S. Congressional session amended the Soil Conservation Act of 1935 by passing Pub. L. 74–461 and renaming the legislation the Soil Conservation and Domestic Allotment Act with the express purpose of encouraging the use of soil resources in such a manner as to preserve and improve fertility, promote economic use, and diminish the exploitation and unprofitable use of the national soil resources. Franklin D. Roosevelt signed the Act into law on February 29, 1936.

== Provisions ==
It meant to help with some of the problems with the previous Act, most notably its failure to protect sharecroppers and tenant farmers. Landlords were now required to share the payments they received from the government for cutting back production with those who worked on their land.

The Act also gave directives to conserve the soil in the "high plains"—soil that was being raised into huge dust bowls during the 1930s. This period, known as the Dust Bowl, coupled with the economic hardships of the Great Depression, hit farmers particularly hard. The act attempted to correct earlier government policy that encouraged farmers to use their land without concern to the repercussions. The result of these agricultural methods (mostly the way farmers plowed their land) made it vulnerable to the winds. The dry ground, now exposed, rose up to create the "black storms".

The Act both educated farmers on how to use their lands without damaging them, and took immediate action to contain the dust bowl's effects—notably by planting trees and native grass.

== See also ==
- Agriculture in the United States
- National Resources Board of 1934
- Timeline of environmental history
