= Food Export USA-Northeast =

Nonprofit promoting food exportation

Food Export USA - Northeast
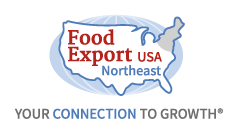
- Formation: 1973
- Location: Philadelphia, Pennsylvania
- Executive Director: Brendan Wilson
- Website: www.foodexport.org

Food Export USA – Northeast (Food Export – Northeast) is a private, non-profit association that promotes the export of food and agricultural products from the Northeast region of the United States. The organization has been helping exporters of Northeast food and agricultural products sell their products overseas since 1973.

Food Export - Northeast is one of four State Regional Trade Groups (SRTGs) that assist companies with export promotion. Three other regional groups, Food Export Association of the Midwest USA (Food Export - Midwest), Southern United States Trade Association (SUSTA), and Western United States Agricultural Trade Association (WUSATA) provide similar services for companies based or sourcing product from outside of the Food Export-Northeast ten-state region.

== History ==
Founded in 1973, Food Export - Northeast was first created as a cooperative effort between 10 Northeastern state agricultural promotion agencies and the United States Department of Agriculture's Foreign Agricultural Service (FAS). Those states are Connecticut, Delaware, Maine, Massachusetts, New Hampshire, New Jersey, New York, Pennsylvania, Rhode Island, and Vermont.

== Market Access Program ==
Food Export - Northeast is one of several organizations that administer its programs each year through Market Access Program funding. Through the Market Access Program (MAP), The United States Department of Agriculture's (USDA) Foreign Agricultural Service (FAS) "partners with U.S. agricultural trade associations, cooperatives, state regional trade groups and small businesses to share the costs of overseas marketing and promotional activities that help build commercial export markets for U.S. agricultural products and commodities.”

== Strategic Alliance ==
In April 2000, Food Export - Northeast entered into a strategic alliance with Food Export - Midwest. Both organizations thereafter collaborated on activities, markets, programs and services to greatly expand the available resources for U.S. companies in their regions.

== Programs and Services ==
Food Export – Northeast offers a variety of programs and services to help exporters of Northeastern food and agricultural products begin or expand their international sales. Food Export – Northeast's export strategy includes three primary components: Exporter Education, Market Entry and Market Promotion. The objective for these programs is to provide U.S. exporters resources to pursue the export market for their food and agricultural products.

Export Education

Food Export - Northeast provides valuable educational services to U.S. Suppliers who export food and agriculture products. Entering the export market takes know-how. Exporter Education programs provide information and education in a variety of formats to help companies increase their exporter knowledge.

- Export Essentials Online– An 11 chapter online learning system to help companies learn how to export successfully.
- Food Export Helpline – A one on one conversation with an industry expert who can help you navigate the complicated issues of exporting.
- Seminars – Hands-on seminars throughout the year held at a variety of locations on export industry topics.
- Webinars – Webinars provide up to date exporter intelligence for companies regarding a variety of industry topics.

Market Entry

Food Export – Northeast provides a variety of Market Entry activities to help companies of all levels of exporting experience increase their global reach.

- Market Builder – Provides customized research to help your company uncover potential in international markets.
- Buyers Missions – Meet international buyers and promote your products without leaving the U.S.
- Food Show PLUS! – Maximize your tradeshow success with introductions to qualified buyers, in-market briefings, on-site assistance, self-guided retail tours and post-show lead qualifications.
- Trade Leads - If you have participated in any Food Export activity such as a Market Builder, Buyers Mission, Food Show PLUS!, Focused Trade Mission or Branded Program, you can receive leads at no cost to you. Food Export – Northeast's network of In-Market Representatives and the USDA/Foreign Agricultural Service offices meet with qualified buyers throughout the year and provide leads to Food Export – Northeast.
- Export Advisor Program - A year-long service which provides custom assistance from an experienced advisor to help your company kick start or improve your exporting efforts.

Market Promotion

- Branded Program – A Market Access Program (MAP) funded program that provides eligible companies up to a 50% cost-reimbursement for qualified international marketing expenses.
