= Food Export Association of the Midwest USA =

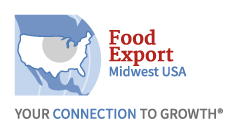
- Formation: 1969
- Headquarters: Chicago, Illinois
- Chief Executive Officer/Executive Director: Brendan Wilson
- Website: https://www.foodexport.org/

Food Export Association of the Midwest USA (Food Export-Midwest) is a non-profit organization created in 1969 as a cooperative effort between 13 Midwestern state agricultural promotion agencies and the United States Department of Agriculture's Foreign Agricultural Service (FAS). The organization provides a wide range of services to promotes the export of food and agricultural products from the Midwestern region of the United States to consumers around the globe.

Based in Chicago, Illinois, Food Export-Midwest works alongside state member agencies, the USDA, and Foreign Agricultural service to help small- and medium- sized companies identify real market opportunities and become export ready.

Food Export-Midwest is one of four State Regional Trade Groups (SRTGs) that assist companies with export promotion. Three other regional groups, Food Export USA-Northeast (Food Export-Northeast), Southern United States Trade Association (SUSTA), and Western U.S. Agricultural Trade Association (WUSATA) provide similar services for companies based or sourcing product from outside of the Food Export-Midwest 13-state region.

== History ==
Foundation

Founded in 1969, Food Export-Midwest was created as a cooperative effort between 13 Midwestern state agricultural promotion agencies and the United States Department of Agriculture's Foreign Agricultural Service (FAS). Those states are Illinois, Indiana, Iowa, Kansas, Michigan, Minnesota, Missouri, Nebraska, North Dakota, Ohio, Oklahoma, South Dakota, and Wisconsin.

The Strategic Alliance

In 2000, Food Export-Midwest formed a strategic alliance with Food Export USA-Northeast (Food Export-Northeast) to enhance their ability to carry out their shared mission. This agreement ensures both organizations retain their independent status, while the companies they serve benefit from the collaborative effort created by the partnership, including streamlined operations, additional resources, and a broader range of international markets.

Food Export-Midwest and Food Export-Northeast's mission is to empower small- and medium-sized businesses throughout the Midwest and Northeast U.S. to sell their food and agricultural products internationally by:

- Simplifying Success: Reducing the risk and complexity of exporting value-added food, agricultural, seafood, and forestry products through education, market development, and promotion.
- Enriching Exchange: Connecting the world’s importers, distributors, manufacturers, and retailers to the best U.S. products and producers to strengthen the vitality of their regions, businesses, and communities.
- Realizing Resources: Partnering effectively with 23 member-state agencies and the USDA’s Foreign Agricultural Service to invest in the future of their member states and U.S. agriculture.

== Market Access Program ==
Food Export-Midwest is one of several organizations that administer its programs each year through Market Access Program funding. Through the Market Access Program (MAP), The United States Department of Agriculture's (USDA) Foreign Agricultural Service (FAS) "partners with U.S. agricultural trade associations, cooperatives, state regional trade groups and small businesses to share the costs of overseas marketing and promotional activities that help build commercial export markets for U.S. agricultural products and commodities." As these exports increase, these small businesses are creating jobs and improving the strength and stability of our agricultural economy.

== Programs and services ==
Food Export-Midwest offers a variety of programs and services to help exporters of Midwestern food and agricultural products begin or expand their international sales. Food Export-Midwest's export strategy includes three primary components: Exporter Education, Market Entry and Market Promotion. The objective for these programs is to provide U.S. exporters resources to pursue the export market for their food and agricultural products. Food Export-Midwest programs and services are designed to educate U.S. suppliers about exporting, find new customers and increase their volume of export sales.

Export Education

Food Export-Midwest provides valuable educational services to U.S. Suppliers who export food and agriculture products. Entering the export market takes know-how. Exporter Education programs provide information and education in a variety of formats to help companies increase their exporter knowledge.

- Export Essentials Online: Provides comprehensive online learning modules on the exporting process.
- Export Advisor Program: Year-long assistance from expert advisors to help companies develop and implement an export strategy.
- Seminars: Live seminars based on key export topics and regional subjects of interest.
- Webinars: Webinars provide up to date exporter intelligence for companies regarding a variety of industry topics.

Market Entry

Food Export-Midwest provides a variety of Market Entry activities to help companies of all levels of exporting experience identify opportunities in international markets and meet potential buyers.

- Market Builder: Provides customized market research to help companies uncover potential in international markets.
- Buyers Missions: Provides companies an opportunity to meet one-on-one with international buyers and promote their products without leaving the U.S.
- Food Show PLUS!: Helps companies maximize their tradeshow success with introductions to qualified buyers, in-market briefings, on-site assistance, self-guided retail tours and post-show lead qualifications.
- Focused Trade Missions: Provides an opportunity to travel and explore an international market to experience the local food industry landscape and meet with prospective buyers.
- U.S. Foodlink: Showcases U.S. products and helps them gain exposure with buyers in this internationally-distributed newsletter.
- Virtual Consultations: Provides the opportunity to meet one-on-one with Food Export’s network of In-Market Representatives (IMRs) to explore questions related to export plans, market expansion, and in-market distribution.
- Lead Qualification Service: Suppliers who participate in any Food Export activity such as a Market Builder, Buyers Mission, Food Show PLUS!, Focused Trade Mission, or Branded Program can receive leads at no additional cost. Food Export-Midwest's network of In-Market Representatives and the USDA/Foreign Agricultural Service offices meet with qualified buyers throughout the year and provide leads to Food Export-Midwest.

Market Promotion

- Branded Program – The Branded Program provides 50% cost reimbursement for a wide variety of international marketing activities.
  - Companies can apply for reimbursement on: International website development, Foreign market-compliant packaging and labels, Advertising and public relations, In-store promotions and product demonstrations, Fees for exhibiting at select overseas and domestic trade shows, Marketing and point-of-sale materials, and Freight costs for product samples.
