= Leslie A. Wheeler =

American diplomat (1899–1968)

Leslie Allen Wheeler (1899–1968) was a U.S. Government official and diplomat whose efforts contributed to broad liberalization of international trade in agricultural products, creation of the International Wheat Council, and creation of the Food and Agriculture Organization of the United Nations.

== Early life and education ==
Leslie Allen Wheeler was born in Ventura, Iowa, on December 20, 1899. He lived in the Imperial Valley of California in his youth, attending and graduating from high school there. Wheeler served in the Army for a few months in 1918. He earned a B.A. at Pomona College in 1921, and an M.B.A. at Harvard University in 1923. He married Louise Price Webster in 1927.

== Career ==
=== U.S. Department of Commerce ===
From 1923 to 1926 Wheeler worked as a research assistant at the Foodstuffs Division of the U.S. Department of Commerce at a pay rate of $1,600 per year. His job consisted of rewriting consular reports into "bulletins on international trade in particular agricultural products."

=== U.S. Department of Agriculture ===
In 1926 he moved to the Foreign Markets Section of the U.S. Department of Agriculture. Wheeler quickly rose through the ranks, first to chief agricultural economist, and then as a branch chief in the Bureau of Agricultural Economics. In 1930 he was assigned to the newly created Foreign Agricultural Service as the de facto Assistant Chief, though without the formal title. In 1931 Wheeler became acting Chief upon Asher Hobson's resignation, at a salary of $3,800 per annum. Wheeler was to head the Foreign Agricultural Service, and its wartime incarnation, the Office of Foreign Agricultural Relations, for the next 17 years.

For the first few years of the Foreign Agricultural Service's existence, it was primarily occupied with statistical reporting and commodity analysis. According to USDA document published in 1940,

The situation changed radically, however, with the passage of the Reciprocal Trade Agreements Act of 1934. This act specifically provided that in formulating trade agreements the President shall seek information from the Department of Agriculture. From the beginning of the trade-agreements program the primary responsibility for cooperation on the part of the Department of Agriculture has devolved upon the Foreign Agricultural Service Division and its successor organizations.

Coincidentally, in 1934 Wheeler was appointed Chief of the Foreign Agricultural Service.

The Reciprocal Trade Agreements Act was passed shortly after Franklin Roosevelt was elected President in order to deal with the consequences of the infamous Smoot-Hawley Tariff Act of 1930. Smoot-Hawley had raised U.S. import tariffs to an average of over 50 percent ad valorem. This sparked retaliatory, prohibitive tariff increases from trading partners that led to a catastrophic collapse of export sales, worsening already-bad economic conditions during the Great Depression. The Reciprocal Trade Agreements Act empowered the President to reduce import tariffs on products from countries that agreed to do the same for U.S. products. Congress realized that if tariffs could be reduced in return for a quid pro quo from each trading partner, U.S. exports might have a chance of returning to earlier levels. The bill was largely written in the Treaty Division at State Department, and Wheeler contributed to its drafting.

In 1939, the agricultural attaché service was transferred to the Department of State, and the Foreign Agricultural Service of USDA was renamed the Office of Foreign Agricultural Relations (OFAR). Wheeler was appointed to head OFAR with the title Director of Foreign Agricultural Relations, which appointment brought with it assignment as USDA's representative on both the Board of the Foreign Service and the Board of Examiners of the Foreign Service. In August 1941 Wheeler was additionally appointed to the Economic Defense Board, and the Washington Post's "Federal Diary" column remarked August 13, 1941,

He is an economist and statistician with administrative ability. He is working on a plan of international control of wheat, and he has been attempting to bring about better relations with South Americans by helping them work out their agricultural problems.

These were veiled references to two U.S. Government priorities: stabilization of wheat prices by coordinating supply and demand between major wheat exporters and members of the British Commonwealth, and boosting South American production of strategic commodities on the eve of World War II.

In addition, the U.S. Government made a conscious effort to allow the U.S. to substitute for Latin America's lost export markets in war-torn Europe, to diminish the influence of Nazi sympathizers in Argentina, Chile, and other parts of Latin America, and to prevent creation of tight economic ties between those countries and Germany. Things went so far that USDA seriously considered creating a Western Hemisphere cartel for staple commodities.

By 1942 the results of Wheeler's work included creation of the International Wheat Council, an objective he had pursued since 1933. The council went to work on creating a 100-million-bushel "relief reserve" for feeding starving citizens of Axis-occupied nations after their expected liberation, and agreement on wheat production quotas among the United States, Canada, Australia and Argentina.

In 1942 Wheeler's responsibilities grew yet again. Up to that point OFAR had consisted mainly of the Director and the Assistant Director, aided by a handful of country analysts. In 1942 OFAR was expanded to accommodate the need for more analysis. During World War II, OFAR contributed heavily to analysis of food shortages in Europe that led to implementation of post-war food aid programs, and also analyzed availability of food to allies and enemy combatants. This work was described as "reports for the Army and Navy and other war agencies on the food situation and problem in enemy, enemy-occupied, and allied countries" and "plans for the relief and rehabilitation of liberated areas."

Wheeler also was heavily involved in implementation of the good-neighbor policy with Latin America. As early as February 10, 1939, Wheeler testified to Congress during the USDA budget hearings of the need for additional funds to place agricultural specialists in Latin America to assist in expanding production of "noncompetitive agricultural products, particularly those of strategic importance to the United States." During the course of the war, OFAR signed cooperative agreements with 12 Latin American countries, starting with Peru, and after the war expanded them into the Middle East and Asia to fight communism. The thought was to increase the ability of Latin American countries to produce more strategic commodities in support of the war effort (an example of this was promoting cultivation of kenaf as a substitute for jute, which was produced in distant, Japanese-dominated Asia). Despite Wheeler's assurances to Congress that the focus would be on non-competitive agricultural products, one long-term consequence of this was the need to improve the efficiency of indigenous food production so Latin American farmers could divert some of their cropland to strategic commodities like rubber, latex, burlap fiber, rotenone, quinine, and manila hemp, not to mention cocoa and coffee.

At the war came to an end, the victors collaborated on creating the United Nations organization, including a Food and Agriculture Organization (FAO). Wheeler was heavily involved in this, as well.

In 1948, the OFAR budget was slashed from $728,000 to $503,000, a catastrophic drop. This influenced Wheeler's decision to leave OFAR in 1948. While the OFAR budget was being debated in the House and Senate (and at one point being pegged at a parsimonious $428,000), Wheeler lunched with a State Department friend at the Cosmos Club, Ambassador Christian M. Ravndal, who asked him why he didn't consider joining the Foreign Service under the Special Manpower Act. Since Ravndal was Director General of the Foreign Service at the time, he was in a position to ensure that Wheeler could be appointed at a rank equivalent to his civil service status as Director of Foreign Agricultural Relations.

Wheeler had to take the Foreign Service Examination. Given his qualifications, the examination mostly consisted of a test of his proficiency in Spanish and French, after which he was passed. Ravndal sent Wheeler's nomination forward to be appointed counselor of embassy (in those days deputy chief of mission) and consul general at Mexico, rank of FSO-1.

At the time of his resignation from USDA on March 1, 1948, Wheeler was chairman of the International Wheat Council and of the International Cotton Advisory Committee. He had to that point attended every FAO conference, and had been instrumental in its founding.

=== U.S. Department of State ===
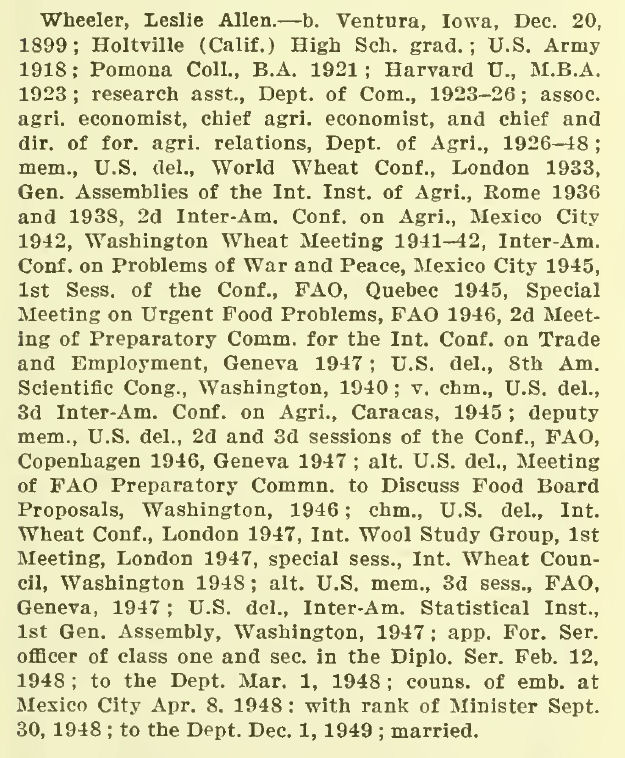
Biographic sketch of Leslie A. Wheeler from the 1950 Biographic Register of the U.S. Department of State, page 539.

On February 12, 1948, Wheeler was appointed a Foreign Service Officer, rank of Class One, and a secretary of the Foreign Service. He was formally transferred to the Department of State on March 1. On April 8 he was appointed counselor of embassy at Mexico City, and he arrived at post in June. Wheeler was granted the diplomatic title of minister plenipotentiary on September 30, 1948. Due to a paperwork error, however, his appointment as a consul general was never made.

Wheeler did not enjoy his tour in Mexico City and made his desire to be moved known to visiting State Department officials. On January 15, 1950, he returned to Washington to work at the State Department as deputy director of the Point Four Program. He stayed in that job until May, when the new Point Four director pushed him out. At that point another old friend came to the rescue, Ambassador Henry Grady. Grady asked Wheeler to come to Teheran as deputy head of the economics section and chief of the "economic advisory group", a euphemism for the assistance mission. Wheeler arrived in Teheran on July 1, 1950. He returned to Washington in September to push through recommendations on Export-Import Bank project financing.

Wheeler sought to be assigned to Rome as the U.S. representative to the FAO but State Department was unable to overcome opposition from USDA, which wanted FAO covered by Department of Agriculture officials based in Washington. State Department was unable to find another position of appropriate stature for Wheeler after that, so he retired on July 31, 1951. He returned temporarily to Federal service for six weeks in 1952 to serve as chair of the American delegation to agriculture negotiations in London.

=== Private Consultant ===
Following that, Wheeler worked as a consultant to private foundations, including the International Federation of Agricultural Producers, and the United Nations. He retired for the second time later in the decade.

In October 1967 Wheeler left his home in Chevy Chase, Maryland, to stay with his sister in Claremont, California, while undergoing treatment for cancer. Wheeler died April 26, 1968, at his sister's home.

== See also ==
- Chief Agricultural Negotiator
- Foreign Agricultural Service
- United States Foreign Service

== Bibliography ==
- Congressional Record. Washington: The Congress, various issues.
- Frontline Diplomacy: The U.S. Foreign Affairs Oral History Collection, Arlington: Association for Diplomatic Studies and Training, 2000 (transcribed oral histories, many of which have been posted to the Library of Congress website at http://memory.loc.gov/ammem/collections/diplomacy/).
- Official Register of the United States Government. Washington: USGPO.
- Oral History Interview with Henry L. Deimel, Washington, D.C., June 5, 1975, Harry S. Truman Library and Museum
- U.S. Department of Agriculture. Report of the Secretary of Agriculture. Washington: USGPO.
- U.S. Department of Agriculture. Office of Foreign Agricultural Relations. Organization and Functions of the Office of Foreign Agricultural Relations. Washington: USGPO, 1940
- U.S. Department of Agriculture. Office of Foreign Agricultural Relations. Administrative Functions and Responsibilities of the Office of Foreign Agricultural Relations. Washington, unpublished circular memorandum, 1949
- U.S. Department of State. Biographic Register. Washington: USGPO. LCCN 09022072.
- Wheeler, Leslie A. (1940). Reciprocal Trade Agreements--A New Method Of Tariff Making (Yearbook of Agriculture, 1940, pp. 585-595). Washington: USGPO.
- Wheeler, Leslie A. (1952). Reminiscences of Leslie A. Wheeler. New York: Oral History Collection of Columbia University.

== Images ==
- Portrait of L.A. Wheeler from the League of Nations Photo Archive
- Members of the U.S. Agricultural Mission to Near East Countries, February 20, 1946, USU Historical Photo-board Collection, photo no. USU-A1161, Utah State University Libraries

This article incorporates public domain material from websites or documents of the Library of Congress.
