= FFPS =

FFPS may refer to:

- Fossil-fuel power station
- Freddy Fazbear's Pizzeria Simulator, the sixth main installment of the Five Nights at Freddy's game series

== See also ==
- FFP (disambiguation)
