= U.S. Trade Internet System =

The U.S. Trade Internet System is a comprehensive, interactive, on-line source of agricultural import and export data maintained by USDA's Foreign Agricultural Service. Users can find, organize, and customize this data (including that provided through BICO and FATUS) by commodity grouping, country, year, and related categories.
