= Iowa Hog Lift =

1960 delivery of hogs from the U.S. to Japan

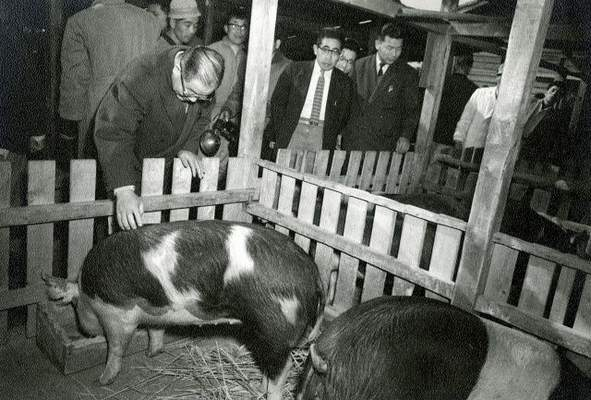
Iowa hogs were met by Governor Hisashi Amano as they arrived in 1960

The Iowa Hog Lift was a 1960 delivery of pigs to Japan by the agriculture sector in the U.S. State of Iowa following significant damage resulting from typhoons in the Yamanashi Prefecture. It is widely accepted that the hog lift was largely responsible for the development of the sister-state relationship between Iowa and Yamanashi and marked the beginning of currently strong relations in agriculture between Japan and the United States.

== Hog Lift ==
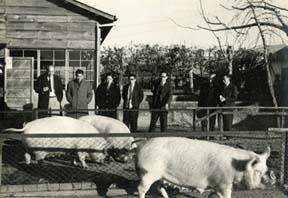
Sergeant Richard Thomas looking over hogs he helped send to Japan

In 1959, Yamanashi Prefecture in central Japan suffered two significant typhoons in less than a month, devastating much of the prefecture's agriculture sector. Master Sergeant Richard Thomas, who was from Iowa, was working in public relations for the U.S. Air Force in Tokyo at the time. When Thomas heard about the heavy damage to the livestock industry in Yamanashi prefecture, he considered arranging Iowa hogs to be sent to Yamanashi as an opportunity to help revive the devastated industry. He presented his plan to Don Motz, the U.S. agricultural attaché at the U.S. Embassy in Tokyo, who was excited about the project and began working on its logistics.

The idea of a "hog lift" received enthusiastic support from multiple parties in the U.S. agriculture sector including the National Corn Growers Association (NCGA), key representatives of the USDA’s Foreign Agricultural Service (FAS) and the Japanese agriculture attaché in Washington D.C.

As a result, Iowa farmers donated 36 lean meat hogs rounded up by the Iowa Corn Growers’ Association, and the U.S. Air Force agreed to supply a plane to fly the hogs to Japan. The animals were shipped on a cargo plane fitted with special crates and attended to by representatives from the Iowa Corn Growers’ Association. The journey took a total of three days and involved multiple stops. At each stop, the hogs were bathed as to not overheat during the journey. With the loss of one animal along the way, 35 hogs arrived safely in Yamanashi, and eventually populated the prefecture with their descendants. Within three years, the 35 hogs had multiplied to more than 500.

Yamanashi prefecture has since repaid the kindness of the hog lift. In 1962 the people of Yamanashi sent Iowa a Bell of Friendship and a bell house which currently sit south of the State Capitol building in Des Moines. Furthermore, when Iowa suffered from the Great Flood of 1993, Yamanashi prefecture sent $300,000 in flood aid relief.

== Legacy ==
Packaging for a Japanese bento lunch product which commemorates the hog lift

The legacy which followed the hog lift has been considerable. Iowa and Yamanashi prefecture established a sister-state relationship in 1960, the first of its kind between the United States and Japan. Though the establishment of the relationship, thousands of people involved in a variety of occupations have traveled between Iowa and Yamanashi. Moreover, every Governor of Iowa has traveled to Yamanashi prefecture since the time of the hog lift. The event is also basis for a children's book titled Sweet Corn and Sushi by Iowa author Lori Erickson, a commemorative bento lunch product, and a courtesy visit to Yamanashi by U.S. Secretary of Agriculture Tom Vilsack, the former Governor of Iowa.

The hog lift was also one of the major factors leading to the formation of the U.S. Grains Council. Several feed grains producers in cooperation with the USDA Commodity Credit Corporation donated feed for the 1960 hog lift as the transported animals were not accustomed to feed used in Japan. This led to the 1960 establishment of the Grains Council and Japan's eventual position as the leading overseas consumer of U.S. feed grains.

Iowa and Yamanashi honored their 50th anniversary as sister states in 2010.

== See also ==
- Japan–United States relations
