= Suzanne K. Hale =

American diplomat

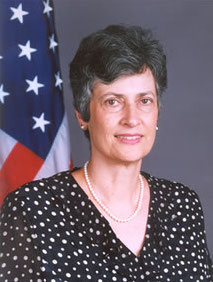
Suzanne K. Hale

Suzanne Kreitner Hale is a former United States Ambassador to the Federated States of Micronesia. The United States Senate confirmed Hale on June 25, 2004. She took charge on August 24 and presented her credentials the next day.

== Career ==
As Minister-Counselor for Agricultural Affairs at the U.S. Embassy in Tokyo, Hale managed USDA's three offices in Japan from 2000 to 2004. From 1997 to 2000, during China's WTO accession negotiations, she served as Minister-Counselor for Agricultural Affairs at the U.S. Embassy in Beijing. As Director of the Foreign Agricultural Service's AgExport Services Division from 1990 to 1996, she managed USDA's international trade show program and coordinated outreach for new exporters.

Hale previously served at the Embassy in Tokyo from 1981 to 1988, first as Agricultural Attaché, then as Agricultural Trade Officer. Ambassador Hale received USDA's top honor – the Secretary of Agriculture's Distinguished Service Award — for her management while opening the first Agricultural Trade Office in Japan. From 1978 to 1981, she worked with USDA's international trade policy staff in Washington, DC.

Following her return from Micronesia in August 2007, Ambassador Hale served as deputy administrator for country and regional affairs of the Foreign Agricultural Service, then as associate administrator, and during the transition from the George W. Bush to the Obama Administrations, as acting administrator. Hale retired on November 30, 2010, with the personal rank of Career Minister after more than 30 years of public service.

== Personal life ==
Hale was raised in western New York, and educated at Columbia University’s School of International and Public Affairs, the International Christian University in Tokyo, and Beloit College in Beloit, Wisconsin. Her husband is an attorney and they have two grown children.

== Sources ==
- United States Department of State: Biography of Suzanne K. Hale
- United States Embassy in Kolonia: Biography of the Ambassador
- FAS Online (official website of the Foreign Agricultural Service)

Diplomatic posts
Preceded by Larry M. Dinger	U.S. Ambassador to Micronesia; 2004–2007	Succeeded by Miriam K. Hughes
