= Monetization of U.S. in-kind food aid =

Monetization of U.S. in-kind food aid is the sale of food commodities purchased in and shipped from the United States and sold for local currency in a recipient country by "cooperating sponsors", which are typically U.S.-based non-governmental organizations (NGOs) or recipient governments.

In the case of the monetization of U.S. food aid, the U.S. provides food commodities for free or under favorable terms to a cooperating sponsor, which could be a recipient country's government or an NGO working there. The recipient organization sells the commodities to local processors or traders who turn around and sell the commodity on the market in raw or processed form. Proceeds from the sale to the processors or traders support technical assistance projects or public infrastructure investments in the same country, or in the case of third-party monetization, another country in the region. Money can also be used in “targeted monetization”, where the cooperating sponsor sells small quantities with the purpose of developing the market, reducing market volatility, or improving food access.

According to a study by Barrett and Lentz, monetization in the United States is driven by the "iron triangle" of producers and processors, the U.S. shipping industry, and NGOs. Producers and processors supply almost all of the procurements of U.S. food aid through the USDA on behalf of USAID. Furthermore, U.S. law requires 75% of nonemergency food commodity tonnage be purchased, bagged, or processed, which provides U.S. companies with business. The law requires 50% of Title II grains to be bagged in the U.S. and 75% of U.S. food aid must ship on U.S. flag carrier vessels. Many NGOs also favor monetization because aid through monetization funds their programs.

Monetization of food aid is controversial. Critics claim it carries the risks of other types of food aid, which include displacing imports and disruption of local markets. These issues have brought a number of objectors, including the WTO, U.S. commercial exporters, and recipient country producers and traders. The United Nations Food and Agriculture Organization also called for an end to monetization in The State of Food and Agriculture report in 2006, alleging monetized food aid represents over 30% of project food aid globally and is "often a dangerous way of destroying local farm prices." Additionally, monetization has been labeled “inefficient” by a number of analyses, including that of the Government Accountability Office (GAO). For these reasons, some NGOs, such as CARE, have decided to reduce or forgo monetization in the future.

== Background ==
Use of Monetization by Program Authority: Percentage of funds used for monetization and direct distribution

Monetization of food aid is almost solely a practice of the United States and U.S.-based NGOs. The World Food Programme and European donors have discontinued most programs that provide food for monetization, while the United States government requires monetization by law. The Food Security Act of 1985 introduced this requirement by allowing “cooperating sponsors” to cover administrative costs through the sale of United States in-kind food donations. In 1988, Title II PL 480 expanded to cover development projects as well, and non-emergency funding through monetization had a minimum level of 10%, which increased to 15% with the 1996 Farm Bill. Additionally, it allowed for third-party monetization, which means food aid can be sold in one county to generate money to finance emergency or development programs in another country. The Food for Progress Program and the McGovern-Dole International Food for Education and Child Nutrition Program also allow for monetization.

According to the Food for Peace Monetization Field Manual Title II food aid has two objectives,

First, Title II food aid monetization is programmed to enhance food security. Second, Title II food aid is used by a CS [cooperating sponsor] to generate foreign currency to support development activities.

Monetization offers the potential to improve the marketing of food to permit greater access to those who are food insecure. Indeed, there is an important direct link between food security and how food aid is monetized. The process of monetizing can be used to promote low-cost, competitive food markets by encouraging investment in transportation, infrastructure and human capital (traders, entrepreneurs). In essence, food aid monetization can enhance long-term food security by encouraging the development of competitive food marketing systems that have built-in incentives to provide the poor with affordable staple foods.

The United States reinforced its dedication to food aid and monetization for nonemergency development through the 2008 Farm Bill. This bill enacted hard earmarks for the first time, setting annual minimum commitments for nonemergency Title II programs: $375 million in FY2009, $400 million in FY2010, $425 million in FY2011, $450 million in FY2012(Sect. 3021).

However, a provision in the same bill (Sect. 3008) raised the cap on funding under Section 202(e), which allows cash resources to be “made available to Cooperating Sponsors for establishing new programs and meeting the specific administrative, management, and personnel costs of programs”(7 USC 1722(e)). Previously, the law restricted this funding to "not less than 5 percent nor more than 10 percent." The 2008 Farm Bill raised those values to 7.5 and 13 respectively and expanded the list of uses for those funds, giving the Office of Food for Peace greater flexibility to provide cash to cooperating sponsors when monetization would not be appropriate.

Since the introduction and subsequent changes of Title II, non-emergency food aid and the number of cooperating sponsors, most of which are US-based NGOs, have increased. Monetization of food aid was originally intended to help agencies cover the cost of distribution of food and implementation of food-based development programs. However, monetization has since become much more prevalent as more organizations enter the field and existing cooperating sponsors expand their programs. Programs have also become inclusive of other activities such as maternal and child health. According to a 2007 report from the United States Government Accountability Office, while the minimum level of nonemergency funding through monetization is 15%, it reached almost 70% in 2001. It declined to around 50% in 2005, likely due to the Office of Management and Budget's (OMB) recommendation to decrease monetization and due to the increasing demand for emergency food aid. In a report prepared by Mendez England and Associates for the U.S. Office of Food for Peace, monetization of Title II food aid increased from 1987 with $21 million and five cooperating sponsors in 19 countries to 1994 with $80 million and 43 projects in 24 countries. Between FY1999 and 2005, the overall contribution of monetized food aid could conservatively be as large as $900 million in support of projects with the assumption of a 60% recovery rate from the delivered commodities. This could be as high as $1.2 billion with an 80% recovery rate from US monetized Title II food aid.

== Potential effects ==
Positive

- Increases the quality and quantity of food available in the recipient country
- Generates income for development projects and food distribution
- Develops markets and stabilize local food prices

Negative

- Displaces imports
- Disrupts local markets
- Leads to dependency on aid in recipient countries
- Creates inefficiency in monetary provision of aid

According to the USAID Food for Peace Manual, “Above and beyond the generation of funds for food security activities, monetization is one more tool among the set of programming options available to enhance the food security of vulnerable households through the use of U.S. food commodities." Monetization also creates opportunities for American businesses to produce, process, and ship in-kind food aid.

=== Increase of Food Quantity and Nutritional Benefits ===
Food aid aims to provide additional food consumption to that which would have taken place without food aid. Calculating whether monetization of food aid causes additional food consumption can be complicated because food aid provided can displace food provided locally and through imports in the market. USAID uses the Bellmon analysis to determine the level of food that would have already been available on the market. The Bellmon analysis guidelines intend to ensure food aid provides, “no substantial disincentive to domestic production and marketing.” “Usual Market Requirements” used by food aid organizations, Bellmon analyses, and Title II funding aim to ensure that monetization of food aid does not replace imports or displace local production completely. Thus, food aid can claim to provide additional food to what would have already been available. Among regular recipients of food aid in the 1999-2005 period, 32% of the value of food for monetization qualified as “additional.”

Furthermore, the food provided from the United States is generally high quality and provides vitamins, minerals, protein, and energy. Value-added food aid products such as corn soy blend and wheat soy blend have provided nutrition to impoverished societies data shows, and processed foods require less time to cook, which results in less need for fuel. However, not all aid is as nutritionally valuable because monetization aims to maximize funding for programs rather than maximize nutrition. For example, the most common value addition to products is production of vitamin A-fortified vegetable oil.

=== Generation of Income for Development Projects and Food Distribution ===
Many cooperating sponsors see the most important advantage of food aid as the accomplishments of the projects established through funding provided by monetization and the future benefits of those projects. Projects funded through monetization address causes of hunger and malnutrition and aim to reduce the need for emergency food assistance.

In 2001, the USDA released a report listing some of the projects monetization has funded. These range from “Promoting Agricultural Development in Cape Verde” to “Funding Agricultural Lending in Moldova.” The report includes 11 countries and concludes, “The monetization of food aid commodities has significant food security and development impacts. In addition, monetization provides a modest benefit to U.S. farmers by contributing to U.S. agricultural exports. While there are challenges and constraints to the effective use of monetized proceeds, experience demonstrates that food aid monetization can be an effective resource for grassroots development in foreign countries.“

However, the benefits of these projects are often descriptive, so the actual impact in numbers and estimates on sustainability and broad impact are difficult to estimate. Save the Children has tried to accomplish more analytic evaluation by commissioning its own evaluation of its multi-year project in Mozambique and working with an independent team from Michigan State University (MSU). These studies and others have concluded, “evidence that the use of food aid, and, specifically, effective programming of the revenues from monetization, can support expanded food availability and other beneficial outcomes.”

=== Development of markets and stabilization of prices ===
Barrett and Maxwell state in Food Aid After Fifty Years:Recasting its Role, "that monetization can be done in such a way as to encourage local market development by promoting private sector development." They provide the example of selling food through small traders and processors based in villages to help stimulate competitive distribution channels. Operation Flood in India is a specific example cited to illustrate monetization of food aid developing a market. The European Community via WFP provided skimmed milk powder and butter to fund the first phase of the project. Eventually the project, which targeted linking milksheds with markets in cities, created a self-sustaining system of 43,000 village cooperatives and connected 136 milksheds to 290 markets. Thus, monetization promoted market development "through enhanced value-added in upstream production, processing and direct marketing by smallholder producers, increasing their share of the profits from retail milk sales in India."

== Criticisms ==
The production and shipment of in-kind food aid is often more costly than other methods of providing food assistance, and persistent provision of food aid can create a dependency of the recipient country on food aid. Monetization is controversial in the international community; according to critics, “in addition to being highly inefficient, monetization has also proven harmful to regional markets and poor farmers in recipient countries and sometimes to U.S. producers." The GAO has stated, “the current practice of using food aid to generate cash for development projects—monetization—is an inherently inefficient use of resources.”

While many private voluntary organizations support monetization of food aid because it funds their programs, some have begun to fall on the other side. CARE ended its open-market monetization in 2009. TechnoServe announced in 2003 that it would not enter into new Food for Peace contracts because it was an unreliable source of funding. Catholic Relief Services, Save the Children, CARE, and other aid groups signed a 2006 declaration stating monetization is inefficient and diverts food from the poor. Catholic Relief Services states it, “sells commodities only when it has determined that there are no alternative methods of funding and that the sale of the commodities will have no negative impacts on local markets and local production. CRS will seek to replace monetization with cash funding to cover program costs.”

In 2007, CARE announced it would phase out all monetized food aid by 2009, choosing to forgo the $46 million in food aid it received from the United States government. CARE made the declaration in the International Herald Tribute. CARE's 2006 White Paper on food Policy finds three problems with monetization of food aid:

1. Experience has shown that monetization requires intensive management and is fraught with risks. Procurement, shipping, commodity management, and commercial transactions are management intensive and costly. Experience has shown that these transactions are also fraught with legal and financial risks.

2. Monetization is economically inefficient. Purchasing food in the US, shipping it overseas, and then selling it to generate funds for food security programs is far less cost-effective than the logical alternative – simply providing cash to fund food security programs.

3. When monetization involves open-market sale of commodities to generate cash, which is almost always the case, it inevitably causes commercial displacement. It can therefore be harmful to traders and local farmers, and can undermine the development of local markets, which is detrimental to longer-term food security objectives.

Many NGOs indicate monetization is an inconvenience at best and can take resources and focus away from their development goals, as they have to hire personnel with expertise in “commodity marketing, commercial contracting, finance, and logistics” to handle monetization. When NGOs fail to handle food aid with expertise, local traders have complained, “about the adverse effects on the commercial marketing channel of inept competition.” Although NGO practices have improved over the years, they have often sold commodities below market prices, which undersells local traders and adversely affects the market.

Moreover, funds generated from monetization are often unpredictable as they depend on market prices, and this fluctuation in funding can affect NGOs’ programming. Also, monetization often recovers a fraction of the worth of the food commodities, leading to complaints about efficiency.

Most NGOs agree and have supported and campaigned for reform.
