= Intermediate agricultural product =

Semi-processed agricultural products

The term intermediate agricultural products generally refers to agricultural products that have a higher per-unit value than bulk commodities. They are often partly processed but not necessarily ready for the consumers. Examples might include soybean meal, wheat flour, vegetable oils, feeds and fodders, animal fats, hides and skins, live animals, and sweeteners such as sugars. Applied to trade policy, intermediate products are one of three categories of agricultural products used by the Foreign Agricultural Service to report export and import data under its BICO system (the others are bulk and consumer-oriented agricultural products).
