= Unified Export Strategy =

Consolidated application prcoccess used in agricultural trade

The Unified Export Strategy (UES) is a single, consolidated application process that U.S. agricultural trade promotion groups use to apply for funding for a variety of USDA export promotion programs, including the Market Access Program and the Foreign Market Development Cooperator Program. USDA introduced UES in 1998 in large part to ensure that applicants for the programs have a long-term overall strategy and to make it easier for them to integrate various sources of federal funding into that strategy.
