= Southern United States Trade Association =

Organization

- Abbreviation: SUSTA
- Formation: 1973; 53 years ago
- Type: Not-for-profit Trade association
- Location: New Orleans, Louisiana, United States
- Region served: Southern United States
- Executive Director: Bernadette Wiltz
- Website: www.susta.org

The Southern United States Trade Association (SUSTA) is an American trade association that is one of four non-profit State Regional Trade Groups (SRTG) that help small U.S. companies build global businesses. This is achieved through various programs designed to educate companies on exporting fundamentals as well as assist them in identifying prospective distributors and additional business opportunities overseas.

SUSTA is composed of the Departments of Agriculture of 15 states in the southern United States plus the Commonwealth of Puerto Rico. SUSTA is one of 67 organizations who administer a government-funded matching funds program called the Market Access Program (MAP).

In addition to MAP, SUSTA provides expert assistance to high-value U.S. food producers and processors who are looking to develop international contacts and establish a market presence in countries across the globe.

== History ==
The association was established in 1973.

In the decade ending in 2010, SUSTA awarded more than $11 million in federal export promotion funds to 172 Texas companies alone, which led to millions in export sales.

== Market Access Program ==
The Market Access Program (MAP) helps producers, exporters, private companies, and other trade organizations finance promotional activities for U.S. agricultural products. MAP provides companies with up to 50 percent reimbursement for international marketing expenses. Eligible marketing activities most commonly include trade show participation, advertising, in-store demonstrations, consumer or retailer educational seminars, and product label compliance. It is funded by the U.S. Department of Agriculture's (USDA) Commodity Credit Corporation (CCC).

In an example of the MAP Branded program, SUSTA helped Ford's Gourmet Foods access international markets and export millions of jars of their award-winning Bone Suckin’ Barbeque Sauce across the globe.

Companies must apply for MAP Branded each year and the program runs Jan. 1 to Dec. 31.

== Industry export promotions ==
For commodities or products that are least 50 percent U.S. agricultural origin and are not represented by another promotion organization, SUSTA organizes a variety of trade promotions at a reduced cost to participants.

SUSTA is assisted in this effort by its member state Departments of Agriculture.

Common SUSTA activities include:

- Trade missions
- Trade shows
- In-store promotions
- Market research
- Trade seminars
- Hotel and restaurant promotions
- Marketing campaigns

== Affiliated organizations ==
The State Regional Trade Groups (SRTGs) "promote the export of food and agricultural products from their respective regions of the United States." The SRTGs also provide various services to encourage "trade between local food companies and importers around the world." The SRTGs were created in 1986 as a cooperative effort between the State Agricultural Promotion Agencies and the United States Department of Agriculture's Foreign Agricultural Service (FAS).

There are four SRTGs:

- Food Export Association of the Midwest USA
- Food Export USA Northeast
- Southern United States Trade Association (SUSTA)
- Western U.S. Agricultural Trade Association (WUSATA)

The SRTGs also maintain the AgExport Links website that lists industry service providers.

In addition, SUSTA belongs to the U.S. Agricultural Export Development Council (USAEDC) and is affiliated with the Southern Association of State Departments of Agriculture (SASDA) and the National Association of State Departments of Agriculture (NASDA).

USAEDC is a forum for organizations participating in FAS programs. USAEDC and SASDA are not directly involved in the development of export markets. NASDA sponsors international food shows and is an FAS Foreign Market Development Program cooperator. NASDA activities enhance cooperation and coordination among the four SRTGs.

== Foreign buyers ==
In order to provide better assistance to buyers and suppliers, SUSTA posts trade leads from around the world on their site. SUSTA assumes no responsibility for the quality of the leads posted. Trade leads remain on the SUSTA website for approximately one month.

== Additional resources ==
In conjunction with the State Departments of Agriculture, SUSTA offers additional activities that are aimed at connecting U.S. companies with foreign buyers. These include: Trade Missions, Inbound Trade Missions, and one on one meetings. SUSTA also offers the following services: market research, industry-wide promotions, and exporting seminars.
