= Mattie R. Sharpless =

American diplomat

Mattie R. Sharpless (born July 1, 1943) retired after 41 years working for the Foreign Agricultural Service, U.S. Department of Agriculture (USDA). When she retired in January 2006, she had attained the rank of Ambassador, retired from the U.S. Foreign Service. From July 2003 to January 2006, she served as Special Adviser to USDA's Deputy Under Secretary, Farm and Foreign Agricultural Affairs. From 2001 to 2003, she was U.S. Ambassador to the Central African Republic.

When she was nominated to be the U.S. Ambassador to the Central African Republic, Sharpless was Acting Administrator of the Foreign Agricultural Service (FAS).

Sharpless holds a master's in Business Administration and Economics from North Carolina Central University and a B.S. Degree in Business Education from North Carolina College.

== Early life ==
Sharpless grew up in Hampstead, North Carolina, the daughter of James and Lecola Sharpless. She graduated from Pender County Training School in Rocky Point.

== Honors and awards ==
Sharpless has received many awards including the Presidential Meritorious Service Award, the Woman of the Year Award from the Foreign Agricultural Service, and the Superior Honor Award from the USDA and the Presidential Distinguished Service Award.
