= Stanley Andrews (journalist) =

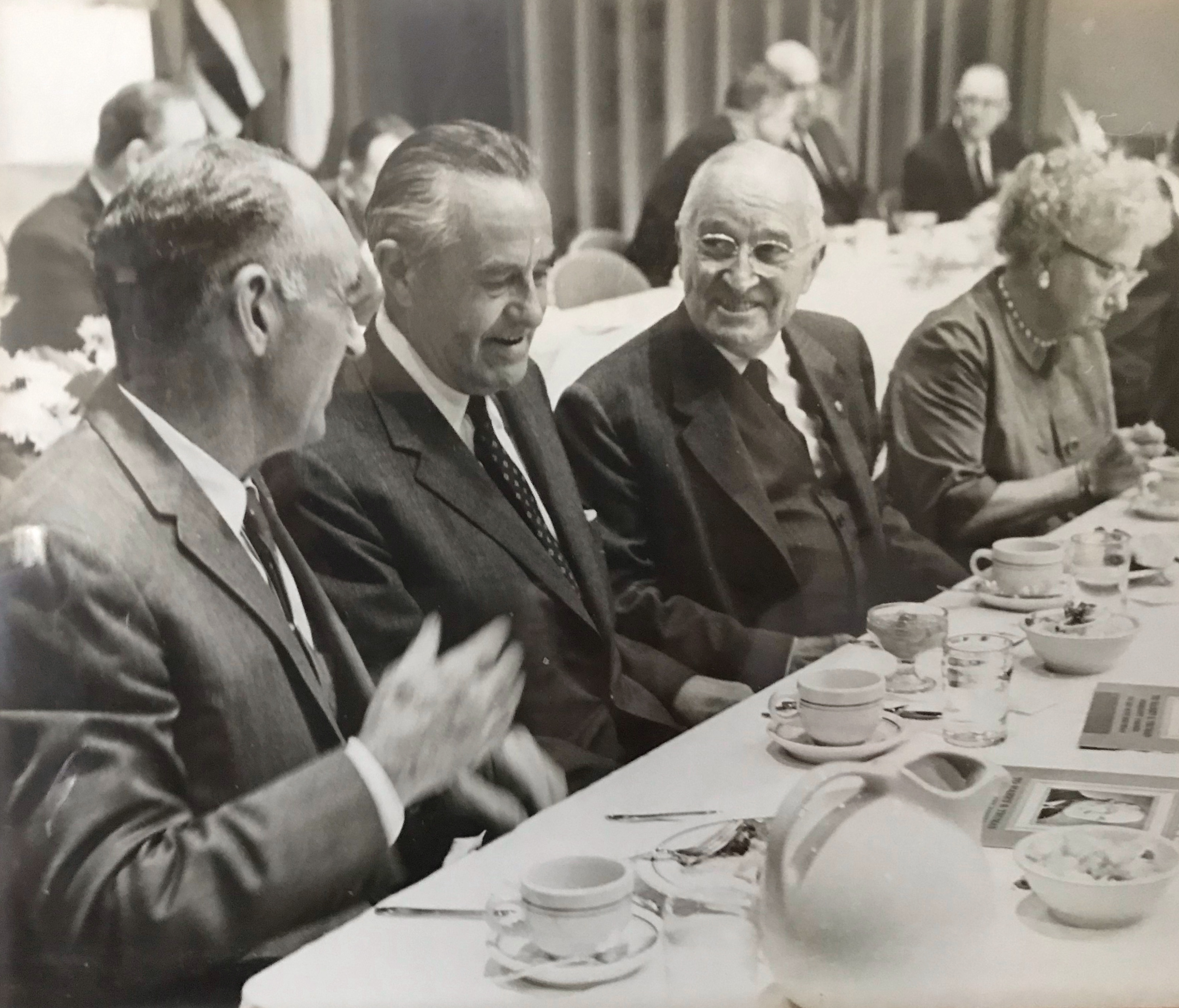
Stanley Andrews, Averell Harriman, and Harry Truman, at a luncheon for Truman's 80th birthday, Independence Missouri, May 1, 1965

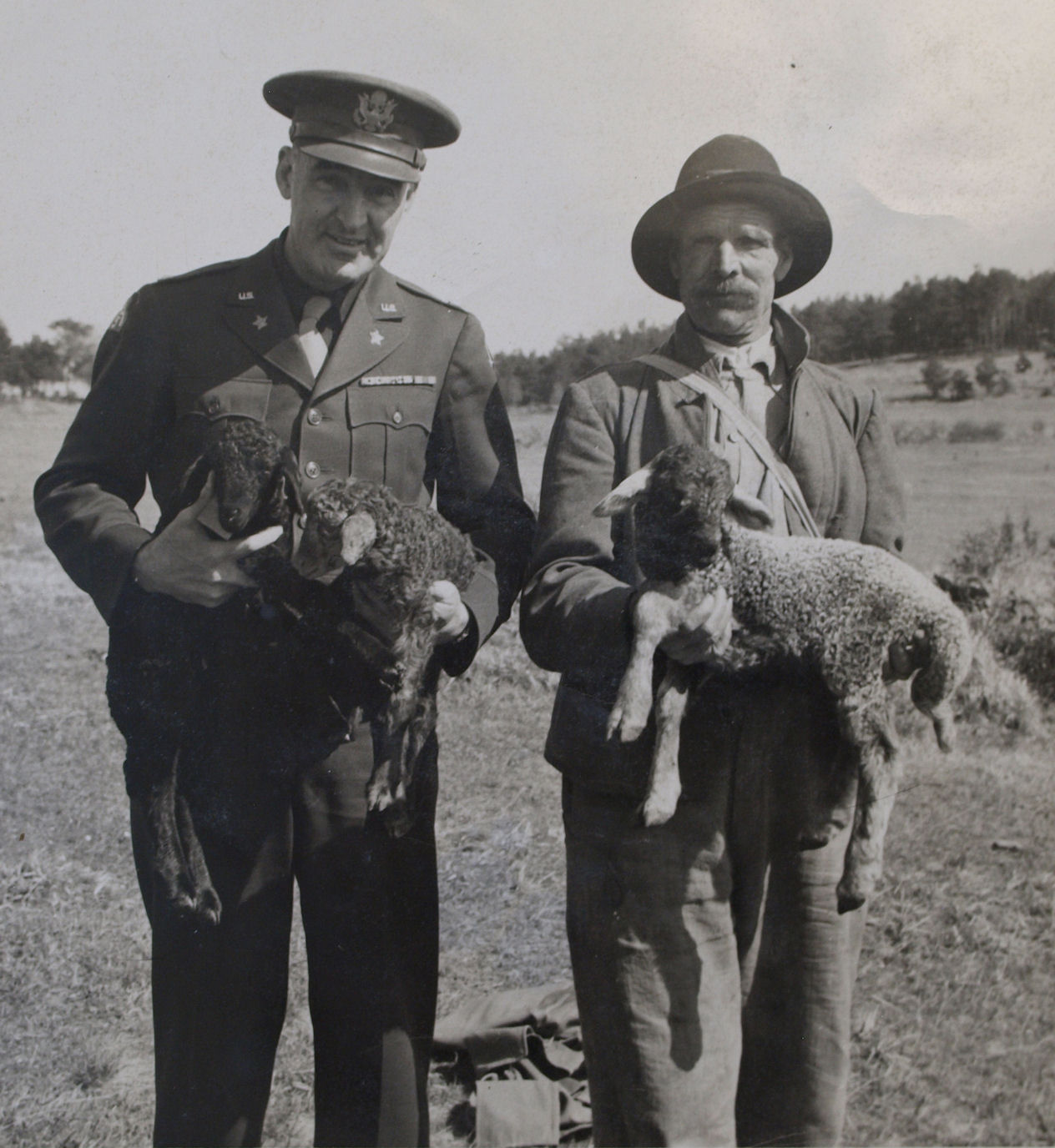
"Lieutenant Colonel Stanley Andrews, chief of the Agricultural Forestry and Fisheries Section of the US Military Government in the American Zone in late 1945 visiting with a Hungarian Caracul Sheep Shepherd and his flock near Berchstengarden Barvaria [sic]." U.S. Army photo, Truman Presidential Library, catalog number 71-3605

Colonel Stanley Andrews (December 18, 1894 – December 31, 1994) was a journalist and U.S. Army officer from Missouri who headed both the Office of Foreign Agricultural Relations of the U.S. Department of Agriculture and the Technical Cooperation Administration of the U.S. Department of State. Colonel Andrews was a veteran of both World War I and World War II. Andrews wrote an unpublished memoir, Journal of a Retread, a copy of which he donated to the Truman Presidential Library along with transfer of its copyright to the public domain.

Swearing in of Stanley Andrews as Administrator, Technical Cooperation Administration, by State Department Chief of Protocol John F. Simmons, as Secretary of State Dean Acheson observes, April 24, 1952. U.S. Department of State photo, Truman Presidential Library, catalog number 72-116

== Biography ==
Stanley Andrews was born at High Point, Missouri, 18 December 1894, the son of George R. and Martha Ann (Board) Andrews.

He graduated from the University of Missouri in 1921, having majored in journalism and agricultural economics. He was married to Florence F. Cox, only daughter of Florence Cox Walker, in 1924. They had one daughter, Florence Walker Andrews.

He served as a first sergeant in the 354 Infantry, 89 Division, AEF, from 1917 to 1919, after which time he returned to civilian life to become editor of the Sedalia Capital newspaper from 1921 to 1922, and political reporter for the Kansas City Journal during 1922. From 1922 to 1927, he was editor of the Eldorado News (and Times). Later, from 1931 to 1934, he became editor of the Arkansas Farmer of Little Rock, and also owner and manager of the radio station KARK. He was editor of the American Cotton Grower of New Orleans, 1934 to 1940, as well as executive editor of the Arkansas Farmer since 1934.

From June 1940 to July 1941, he was assistant to the president of the Commodity Credit Corporation in Washington, D.C., and for two years before entering upon active military duty in June 1943, served as general agent for the Farm Credit Administration at New Orleans, Louisiana. He began his World War II service with the U.S. Army in 1943, and was serving in the rank of colonel when he resumed his civilian career in 1946. During the period 1943 to January 1944, Major Andrews served as a planning adviser on food at AFHQ, North Africa, and assisted in the reorganization of the Sicilian Department of Agriculture. From January to June 1944, as Chief of Forestry and Fisheries, Agricultural Division, Allied Control Commission for Italy, he planned food input requirements, and assisted in reorganization and experimental stations and cooperatives, and in flood drainage projects. Also for a brief period during 1944, he served as custodian, International Institute of Agriculture at Rome.

In September 1944, he became Director of Agriculture, Forestry, and Fisheries, Fifth Army, holding this position until July 1945 when he was made Director of Production, and later, Deputy Director for Food and Agriculture for the United States Zone of Germany. He returned to Germany as a civilian in January 1948 and became Chief, Food, Agriculture, and Forestry Group for U.S. and U.K. Zones of Western Germany, remaining in this position until June 1949. Here he supervised an elaborate system of planning production quotas, collections, distribution, and rationing of all Germany’s food resources, culminating as adviser to General Clay in supervising the procurement, distribution, and supply of food for the Berlin airlift.

In the former position, until his leaving the Army in October 1946 as a full colonel, Mr. Andrews was engaged on food and agriculture field operations, land reform, production planning, food requirements, and distribution, and the German civilian-feeding program. Andrews was decorated for his service with the Legion of Merit (U.S.) and the Crown of Italy.

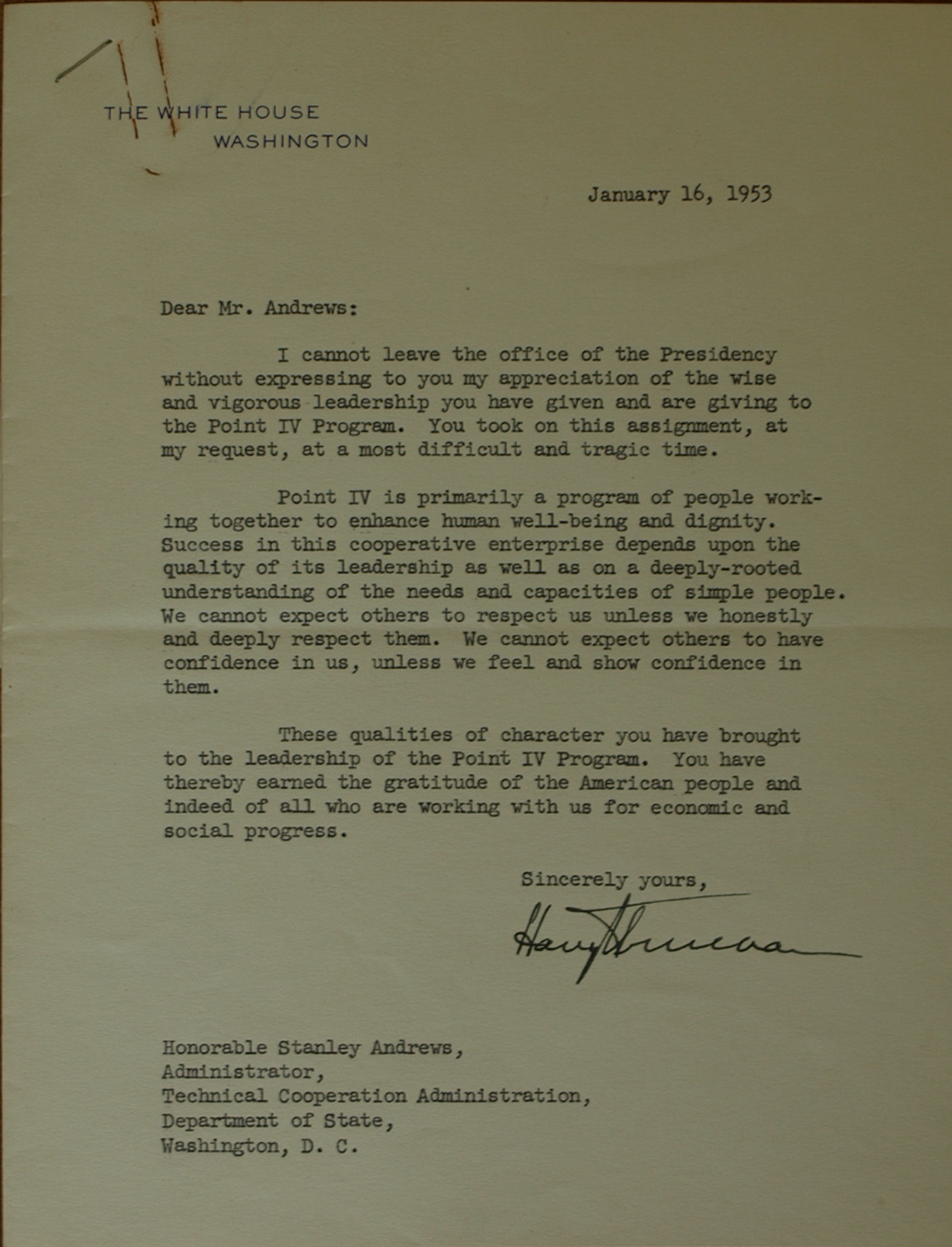
Letter from President Harry S Truman to Col. Andrews thanking him for his service.

He served from January to October 1946 as a consultant on world food problems to the Secretary of Agriculture in Washington, D.C., and as Director of Requirements and Allocations Section, Production and Marketing Administration, United States Department of Agriculture. He was appointed Director of the Office of Foreign Agricultural Relations, U.S. Department of Agriculture, on 5 July 1949.

He was appointed special consultant to the Secretary of State in December 1951 to complete the mission of Dr. Henry Bennett (killed in an airplane crash in Iran). In April 1952 he became administrator of the Technical Cooperation Administration. Andrews remained administrator of the Technical Cooperation Administration until September 1, 1953, when he resigned. He then moved to the Kellogg Foundation to administer the National Project in Agricultural Communications, working there until March 1960.

In 1963 Andrews bought a small citrus grove near Alamo, Texas. He worked briefly as a consultant to the Foreign Agricultural Service in 1965, conducting a survey of overseas posts.

Stanley Andrews died December 31, 1994.

== Legacy ==
The official papers of Stanley Andrews are housed at the Harry S Truman Presidential Library in Independence, Missouri.

== See also ==
- Foreign Agricultural Service
- Point Four Program
