= Little Norway, Wisconsin =

- Little Norway
- U.S. National Register of Historic Places
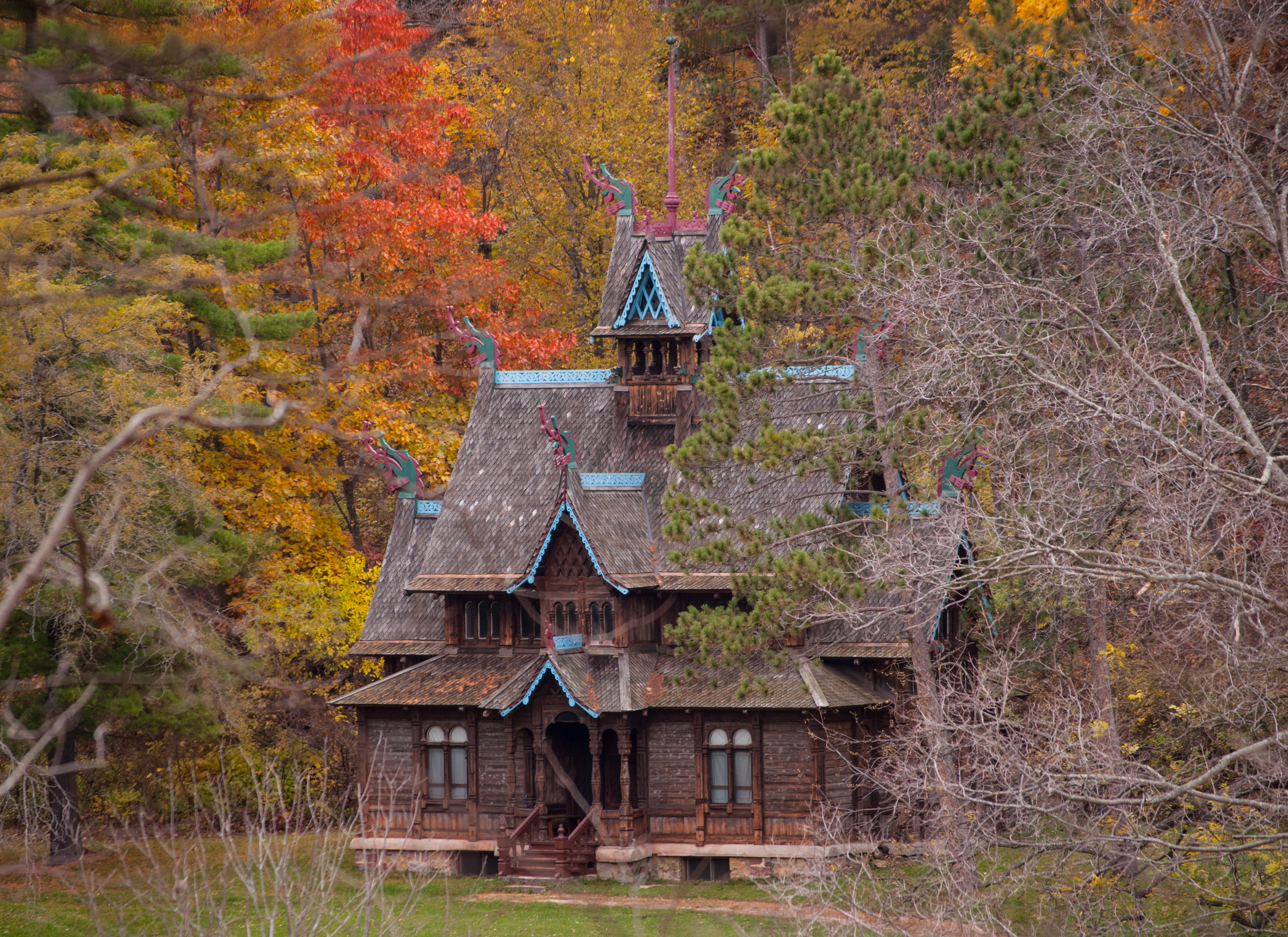
- The Norway Building built in Norway for Chicago's Columbian Exposition.

- Location within Wisconsin Location within the United States
- Location: 3576 CTH JG, Blue Mounds, Wisconsin
- Coordinates: 43°1′32″N 89°47′44″W
- Area: 53 acres (21 ha)
- Built: 1927
- Architect: Hansteen, Albert Waldemar; Nerdrum, Stanley
- Architectural style: Modern Movement
- NRHP reference No.: 98000169
- Added to NRHP: March 16, 1998

Little Norway was a living museum of a Norwegian village located in Blue Mounds, Wisconsin. Little Norway consisted of a fully restored farm dating to the mid-19th century. It is listed on the National Register of Historic Places.

Little Norway closed in late 2012.

== History ==
Little Norway began when Osten Olson Haugen, an immigrant from Telemark, Norway, settled on 40 acres (160,000 m^{2}) during the 1850s. Mr. Haugen built a dwelling house and other buildings out of timber cut on the property. The Haugen family farmed the land until 1920.

In the early 1930s, a Chicago businessman named Isak Dahle was inspired by a recent tour of Norway and memories of his childhood in Southeastern Wisconsin to replicate a Norwegian farm as a gift to his family. He christened it Little Norway and gave it the Norwegian name Nissedahle—a pun on the word dal, meaning valley, and his surname. Dahle died of cancer in 1937.

The site was taken over by his relative, University of Wisconsin Agricultural Economics Department chair Asher Hobson, after Dahle died in 1937. It was taken over by his daughter Marcelaine Winner and later his grandson Scott Winner. After the end of World War II, the owners had offered to sell the facility the State of Wisconsin for $1 but the state didn't want to take on the maintenance of the property.

Little Norway closed late in 2012. Owner Scott Winner cited costs exceeds revenues for shutting it down. He has been selling off pieces of the collection to museums and private collectors to help pay a $22,000 annual tax bill. The property listed for $1.9 million as of December 2014. Since its 2012 closure, Winner has spoken with the Wisconsin Historical Society and other foundations about purchasing the property but no deal has been reached.

== Norway Building ==
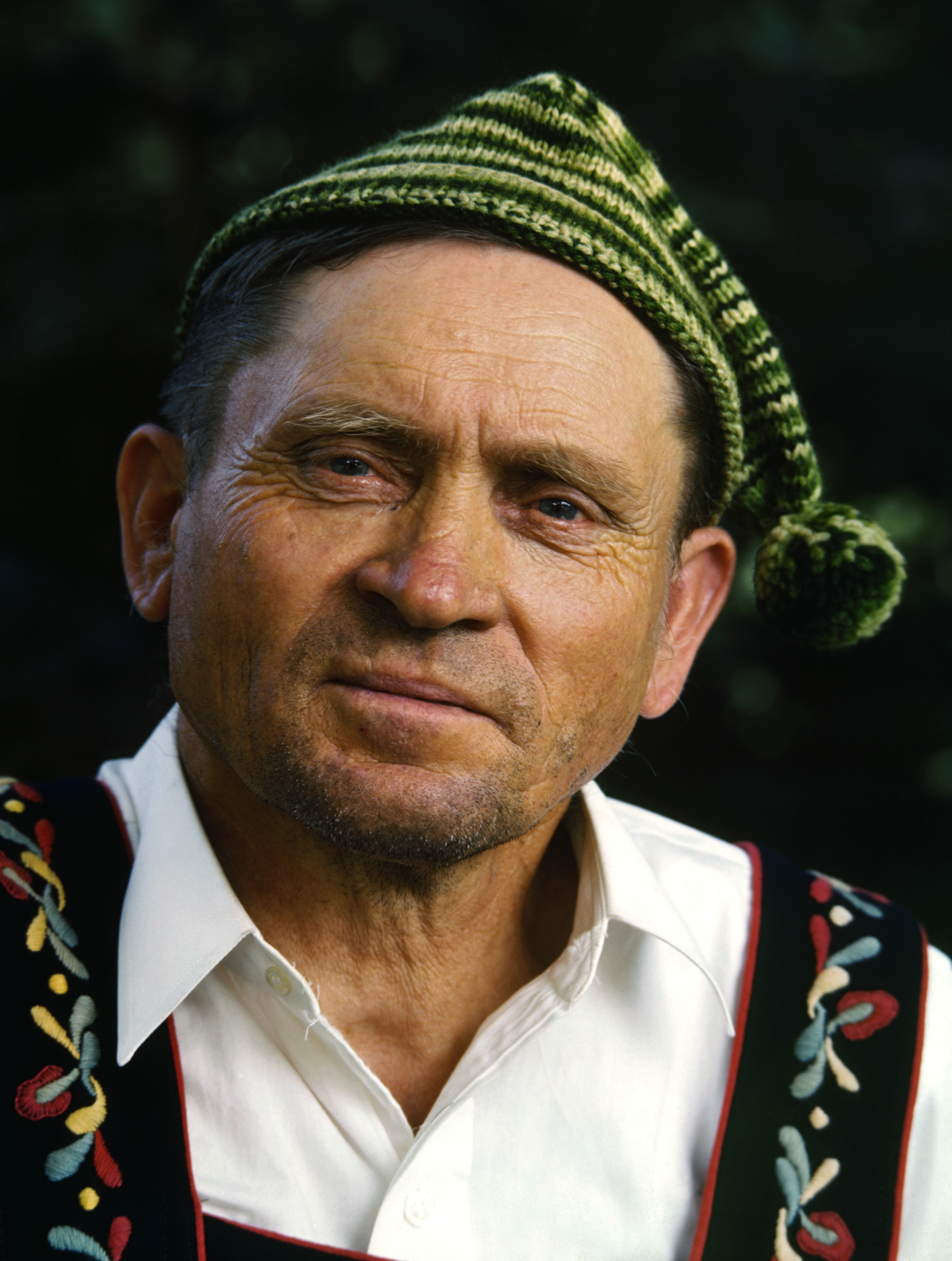
Early color photograph of a guide at Little Norway. Taken by Arthur Rothstein for the Farm Security Administration, 1942. Digitally restored.

Perhaps the best-known attraction at Little Norway was the Norway Building which was built in Orkdal, Norway for the Norway Pavilion at Chicago's 1893 World's Columbian Exposition. by Christian Thams. It was moved to Little Norway and was one of the few examples of Norse stave church architecture outside of Norway. Along with the Maine State Building in Poland, Maine, the Norway building is one of the few remaining buildings from the Chicago World's Fair.

After the closing of the Chicago World's Fair, the Norway Building was sold to C.K.G. Billings, a prominent Chicago business man, and relocated by train to his vacation estate in Lake Geneva, Wisconsin. While in Lake Geneva, the Norway Building passed through multiple owners, and was used primarily for recreation. During the time it was owned by the Wrigley family it was used as a private theater. The Norway Building fell into disrepair during the Great Depression. It was purchased by Little Norway founder Isak Dahle in 1935.

Following the 2012 closure of the attraction, a delegation from Orkdal Municipality, Norway, where the chapel was originally built, began to raise money to purchase the Norway Building and ship the building across the ocean. Between the Norwegian government and private donations, that amount totaled $700,000. In 2015, specialists assessed the building and began to dismantle it. The reassembled building was dedicated on September 9, 2017. A Norwegian delegation headed by the current director of the Norway Building, Arne Aspjell, will dedicate an Illinois State Historical Plaque in Jackson Park near where the original building stood in 1893 on August 25, 2018.

== Other attractions ==
- Stabbur – a food storehouse on a raised foundation of heavy timbers
- Sod roofed cabin – built into the hillside to allow goats to graze on its rooftop
- Main cabin – which once housed cattle and sheep
- Spring house – shelters the pure, spring-fed water which runs through the property
- Stue – the family home
- Bachelor's cabin – originally a loom and spinning wheel space, adapted to house Osten Haugen's brother-in-law
- Laden – a tool room converted to a snug cabin, roofed with old-fashioned hand-split shakes
