= FFP =

FFP may refer to:

== Science and technology ==
- Falsification, fabrication, plagiarism, three types of scientific misconduct
- Far-field pattern, of an antenna or other radiation source
- Filtering facepiece, a filtering half mask
  - FFP standards (filtering facepiece), EU standards for protective respirator masks
- Free-floating planet, a rogue planet
- Fresh frozen plasma, a blood product

== Organisations ==
- Family First Party, an Australian political party
- Feminists Fighting Pornography, an American political activist organization
- Fisher Flying Products, a Canadian aircraft manufacturer
- Food for the Poor, an American charity
- Freedom Front Plus, a South African political party
- Fund for Peace, an American research and educational organization
- Future Forward Party, a Thai political party
- Prima Charter (ICAO code), a defunct Polish airline

== Programs ==
- Food for Peace, a program of the United States Agency for International Development
- Food for Progress Program, of the United States Department of Agriculture
- Fair Food Program, an agreement between the Florida Tomato Growers and the Coalition of Immokalee Workers
- Frequent-flyer program, a loyalty program

== Other uses ==
- First Floor Power, a Swedish rock band
- UEFA Financial Fair Play Regulations, in European association football, rules governing clubs' financial practices
