= Agricultural Trade Act of 1978 =

- Other short titles: Agricultural Export Trade Expansion Act
- Long title: An Act to strengthen the economy of the United States through increased sales abroad of United States agricultural commodities.
- Enacted by: the 95th United States Congress
- Effective: October 21, 1978

Citations
- Public law: 95-501
- Statutes at Large: 92 Stat. 1685

Codification
- Titles amended: 7 U.S.C.: Agriculture
- U.S.C. sections amended: 7 U.S.C. ch. 43 § 1761

Legislative history
- Introduced in the Senate as S. 3447 by Richard Stone (D-FL) on August 23, 1978; Committee consideration by Senate Agriculture, Nutrition, and Forestry; Passed the Senate on September 8, 1978 (65-1); Passed the House on September 25, 1978 (325-62, in lieu of H.R. 10584); Reported by the joint conference committee on October 10, 1978; agreed to by the Senate on October 11, 1978 (agreed) and by the House on October 14, 1978 (356-4); Signed into law by President Jimmy Carter on October 21, 1978

The Agricultural Trade Act of 1978 (P.L. 95-501) directed the establishment of trade offices in major centers of commerce throughout the world. The agricultural trade offices are operated by the Foreign Agricultural Service (FAS) to develop, maintain, and expand international markets for U.S. agricultural commodities and serve as centers for export sales promotion and contact points for importers seeking to buy U.S. farm products.
