= Targeted Export Assistance Program =

U.S. Department of Agriculture program related to product exports

The Targeted Export Assistance Program (TEA) is a program authorized by the Food Security Act of 1985 (P.L. 99-198) to assist U.S. producer groups in promoting exports of products adversely affected by trade practices of foreign governments considered unfair. TEA is the predecessor of the Market Promotion Program (MPP), which was succeeded by the Market Access Program (MAP) in 1996.
