= Dennis A. FitzGerald =

Dennis Alfred FitzGerald
- Born: January 1, 1903; Grenfell, Saskatchewan, Canada
- Died: September 15, 1994 (aged 91)
- Education: University of Saskatchewan; Iowa State; Harvard University
- Occupation: economist

Dennis Alfred FitzGerald (January 1, 1903 – September 15, 1994) was a government official and professional agricultural economist whose knowledge of food distribution gave him the opportunity to serve the U.S. government in many capacities.

== Early life ==
He was born in Grenfell, Saskatchewan, Canada. After attending various grade schools in Saskatchewan and British Columbia he graduated from Grenfell High School in 1919. He received his bachelor's degree from the University of Saskatchewan in 1924 before coming to the United States and receiving a master's degree from Iowa State College of Agriculture in 1925. For the next few years he remained on the staff at Iowa State College as an agricultural economist and marketing specialist.

While attending Harvard University he participated in a Brookings Institution sponsored study of agriculture during the New Deal and three years after becoming a naturalized citizen in 1935, he received his Ph.D. from Harvard University.

== Government career ==
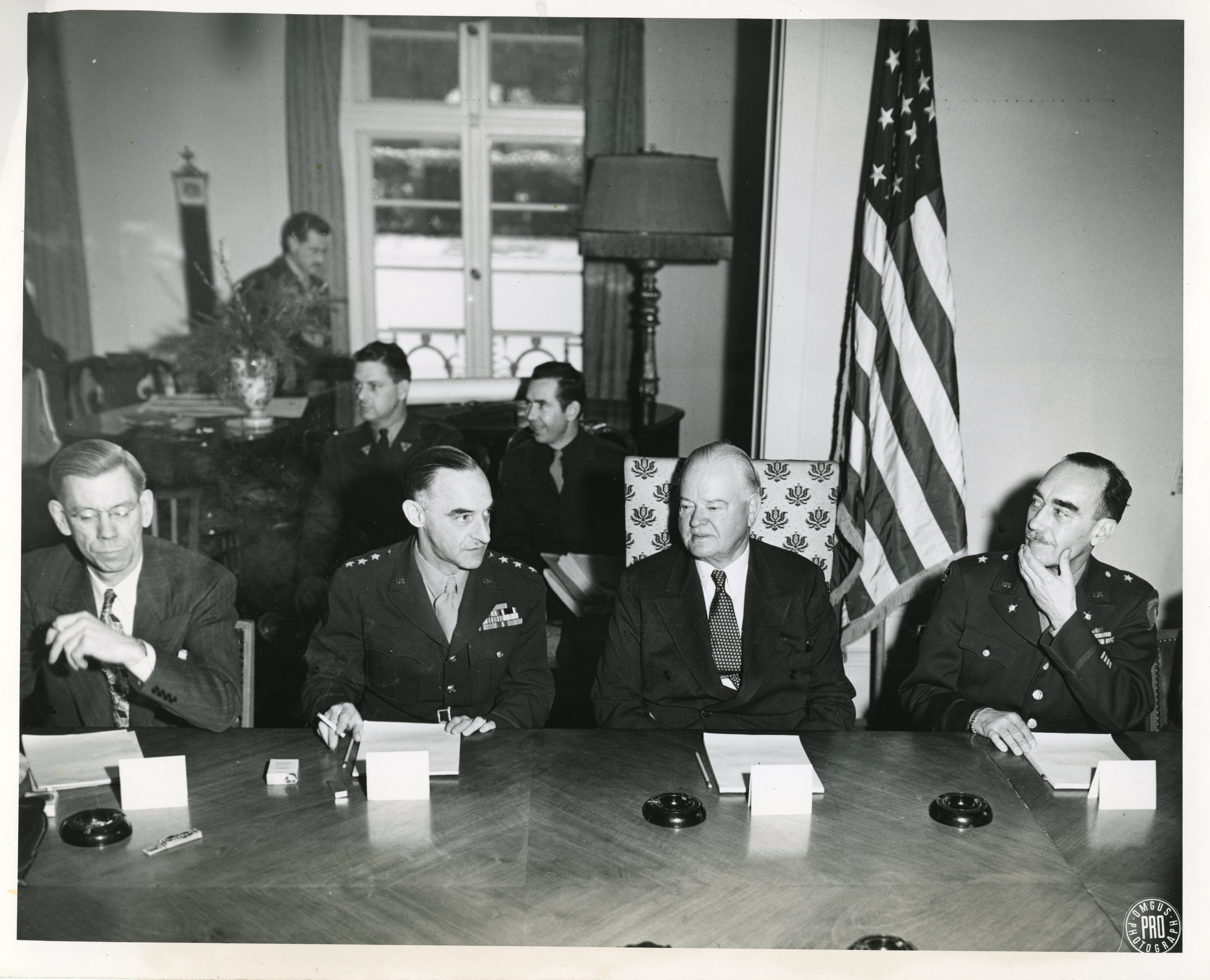
Discussing food and agricultural problem for Germany, left to right: Mr. Dennis Fitzgerald, secretary general, International Emergency Food Council; Lt. General Lucius D. Clay, deputy military governor for Germany (United States); Herbert Hoover; and Brigadier General William H. Draper Jr., director, Economic Division, OMGUS.

FitzGerald then began his service with the U.S. government in 1935 when he became head of the Economic and Research Section, North Central Division, Bureau of Agricultural Economics, U.S. Department of Agriculture. For the next several years he held many positions within the U.S. Department of Agriculture and gained administrative experience plus exposure to the problems of food distribution in a war ravaged world. In 1946 he accompanied former President Herbert Hoover on a world trip to survey the food situation in various countries. Upon his return, he served for the next couple of years as Secretary General, International Emergency Food Council, a United Nations agency composed of representatives of 32 countries interested in dealing with worldwide food shortages during the years following World War II.

In 1948 the U.S. began implementing a massive program of economic assistance to Europe in order to support European recovery from the losses of World War II. This program, popularly known as the Marshall Plan, affected significantly Dennis FitzGerald's career. Paul Hoffman, Director of the Economic Cooperation Administration, the agency established to administer Marshall Plan programs, asked FitzGerald to help organize the Agricultural Division of the Economic Cooperation Administration Thus began FitzGerald's 16-year career as an administrator of U.S. government foreign assistance programs. For roughly his first year on the job, FitzGerald was dual-hatted as Director of Foreign Agricultural Relations at the U.S. Department of Agriculture.

Over the years the name of the agency responsible for these programs changed from Economic Cooperation Administration to the Mutual Security Administration; then it became the Foreign Operations Administration followed by the International Cooperation Administration until finally, in 1961 the Kennedy Administration established the U.S. Agency for International Development which currently administers foreign economic assistance programs. FitzGerald served in important positions through all of these changes in agency names and presidential administrations until the fall of 1961 when he was removed by Fowler Hamilton, President Kennedy's first head of the U.S. Agency for International Development. During these years FitzGerald was primarily an administrator who from 1955 on had the operational responsibility of his agency. In this capacity he exercised broad supervision of U.S. overseas missions and instructed each mission to submit draft programs for each fiscal year. He provided continuity within an agency characterized by frequent changes at the top level. Although a professionally trained agricultural economist with years of administrative experience with foreign aid programs, FitzGerald was also a political appointee and thus subject to the fate of holdover political appointees who are normally replaced by an incoming presidential administration wanting to pick its own people to carry out its policies and programs.

While he was shuffled out of his position as Deputy Director of Operations after the creation of the new Agency for International Development in 1961, FitzGerald retained his connections with the Agency as a consultant to Fowler Hamilton until December 1962. Meanwhile, in September 1962 he joined the Senior Staff of Brookings Institution as a research scholar and remained at Brookings until 1966. While at Brookings FitzGerald conducted research on issues involving foreign economic assistance, participated in Council on Foreign Relations discussions and in the spring of 1963 served as a consultant for the United Nations Special Fund which provided development assistance to Indonesia. In July 1966 he became Vice President of Checci and Company in Washington, DC. He retired in June 1972.

== See also ==
- Foreign Agricultural Service
