= Green box policies =

Green box policies refer to domestic or trade policies that are deemed to be minimally trade-distorting and that are excluded from reduction commitments in the Uruguay Round Agreement on Agriculture. Examples are domestic policies dealing with research, extension, inspection and grading, environmental and conservation programs, disaster relief, crop insurance, domestic food assistance, food security stocks, structural adjustment programs, and direct payments not linked to production. Trade measures or policies such as export market promotion (but not export subsidies or foreign food aid) are also exempt.

== See also ==
- Blue box policies
- Amber box policies
