= Foreign Agricultural Service =

Foreign affairs agency for agriculture

The Foreign Agricultural Service (FAS) is the foreign affairs agency with primary responsibility for the United States Department of Agriculture's (USDA) overseas programs – market development, international trade agreements and negotiations, and the collection of statistics and market information. It also administers the USDA's export credit guarantee and food aid programs and helps increase income and food availability in developing nations by mobilizing expertise for agriculturally led economic growth. The FAS mission statement reads, "Linking U.S. agriculture to the world to enhance export opportunities and global food security," and its motto is "Linking U.S. Agriculture to the World."

== Early history ==
USDA posted its first employee abroad in 1882, with assignment of Edmund Moffat to London. In 1894, USDA created a Section of Foreign Markets in its Division of Statistics, which by 1901 numbered seven employees.

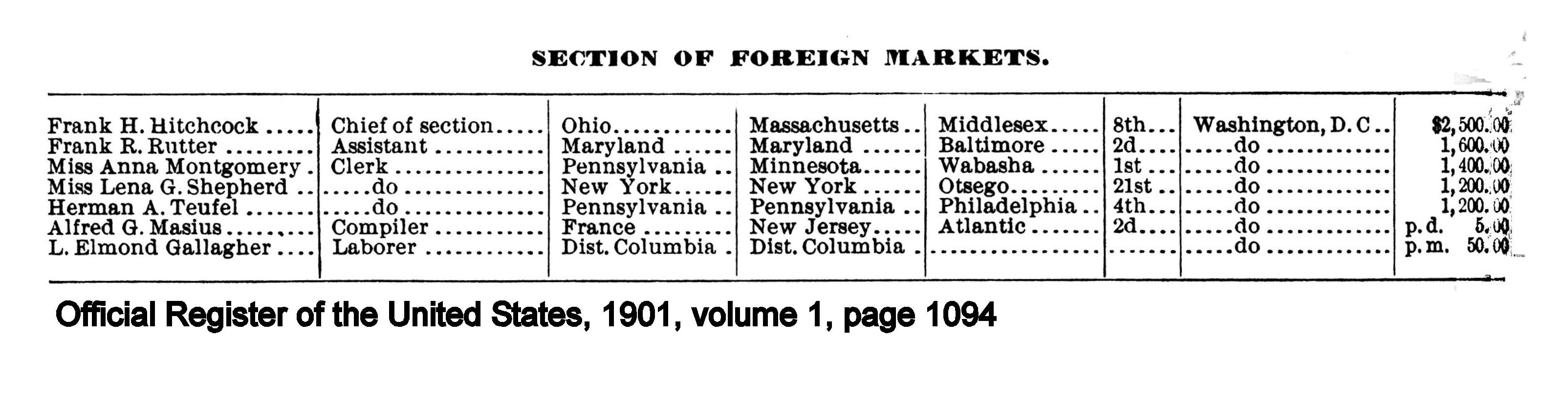
Roster of the Section of Foreign Markets in 1901.

It was succeeded over the next few decades by increasingly larger units. Creation of this series of units in Washington to analyze foreign competition and demand for agricultural commodities was paralleled by assignment abroad of agricultural statistical agents, commodity specialists, and "agricultural commissioners".

Moffat went out as a "statistical agent" of USDA's Division of Statistics but with the status of Deputy Consul General on the roster of the Department of State at London. Subsequent USDA officials assigned overseas, however, did not enjoy diplomatic or consular status. This impeded their work, which at that point consisted mainly of collecting, analyzing, and transmitting to Washington time-sensitive market information on agricultural commodities.

1922 telegram from agricultural commissioner at London to USDA headquarters.

The analytical unit in Washington, by the early 1920s supervised by Leon Estabrook, deputy chief of USDA's Bureau of Agricultural Economics, compiled publications based on reports from the USDA's overseas staff, U.S. consuls abroad, and data collected by the Rome-based International Institute of Agriculture.

In 1924, USDA officials Nils Olsen and Louis Guy Michael and Congressman John Ketcham began drafting legislation to create an agricultural attaché service with diplomatic status. The legislation passed the House multiple times, but it did not pass the Senate until 1930, in part due to opposition from then-Commerce Secretary Herbert Hoover. Hoover, however, eventually supported the legislation to garner support of the farm bloc during his presidential campaign. Accordingly, the Foreign Agricultural Service was created by the Foreign Agricultural Service Act of 1930 (46 Stat. 497), which President Herbert Hoover signed into law on June 5, 1930.

The law stipulated that the FAS consist of overseas USDA officials. The USDA also created a Foreign Agricultural Service Division within the Bureau of Agricultural Economics to serve as the FAS's headquarters staff in Washington, D.C., naming Asher Hobson, a noted economist and political scientist, as its first head. The 1930 Act explicitly granted the USDA's overseas officials diplomatic status and the right to the diplomatic title attaché. In short order, FAS posted additional staff overseas, to Marseille, Pretoria, Belgrade, Sydney, and Kobe, in addition to existing staff in London, Buenos Aires, Berlin, and Shanghai. In Washington, Hobson hired Lazar Volin, a Russian émigré, as the agency's first D.C.-based regional analyst, to specialize in the study of Russia as a competitor to U.S. agriculture.

== International trade policy ==
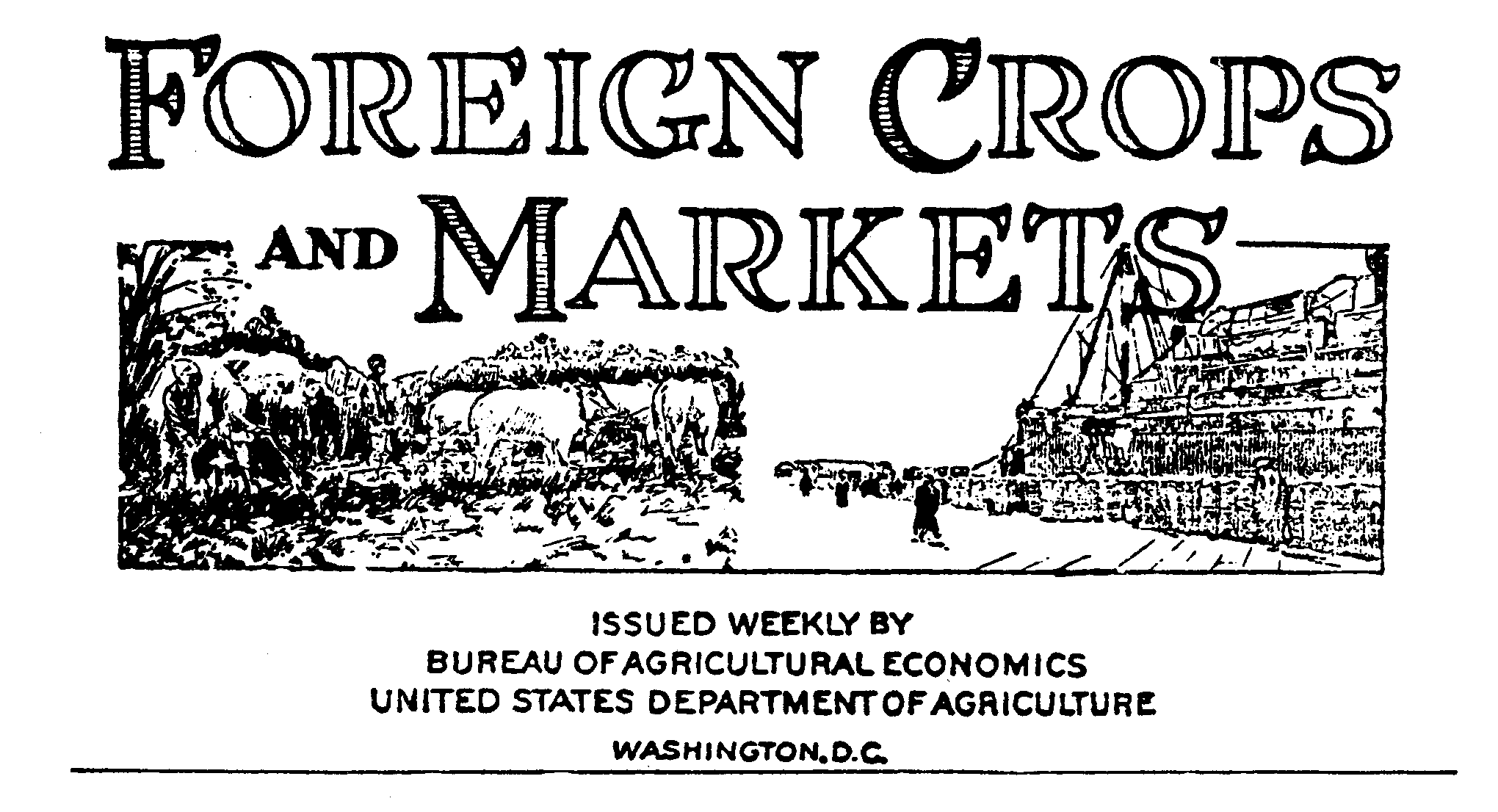
Cover art for the Bureau of Agricultural Economics weekly circular in the 1930s.

In 1934, Congress passed the Reciprocal Trade Agreements Act, which stipulated that the President must consult with the Secretary of Agriculture when negotiating tariff reductions for agricultural commodities. Secretary of Agriculture Henry A. Wallace delegated this responsibility to the Foreign Agricultural Service Division, and thus began the FAS's role in formulation and implementation of international trade policy. The FAS led agricultural tariff negotiations, first concluding a new tariff agreement with Cuba, followed by Belgium, Haiti, Sweden, Brazil and Colombia. By 1939, new agricultural tariffs were in place with 20 countries, including the United Kingdom, the United States' largest agricultural trading partner.

This new responsibility spurred a change in field reporting from overseas offices. To negotiate tariff agreements, the FAS needed comprehensive information on the domestic agricultural policies of trading partners, and the primary source of this information was the agency's field offices abroad. Thus, in addition to traditional commodity reporting, the attachés and commissioners were called on to add policy analysis to their portfolios.

On December 1, 1938, the Foreign Agricultural Service Division was upgraded, made directly subordinate to the Secretary, and renamed simply the Foreign Agricultural Service. On July 1, 1939, however, President Franklin D. Roosevelt ordered all diplomatic personnel, including the agricultural attachés and commissioners, transferred to the Department of State. The Foreign Agricultural Service was abolished, and its headquarters staff was renamed the Office of Foreign Agricultural Relations (OFAR). At that time the Director of Foreign Agricultural Relations, Leslie A. Wheeler, was appointed by executive order to the Board of the Foreign Service and the Board of Examiners, an acknowledgement of OFAR's status as a foreign affairs agency.

== Office of Foreign Agricultural Relations ==
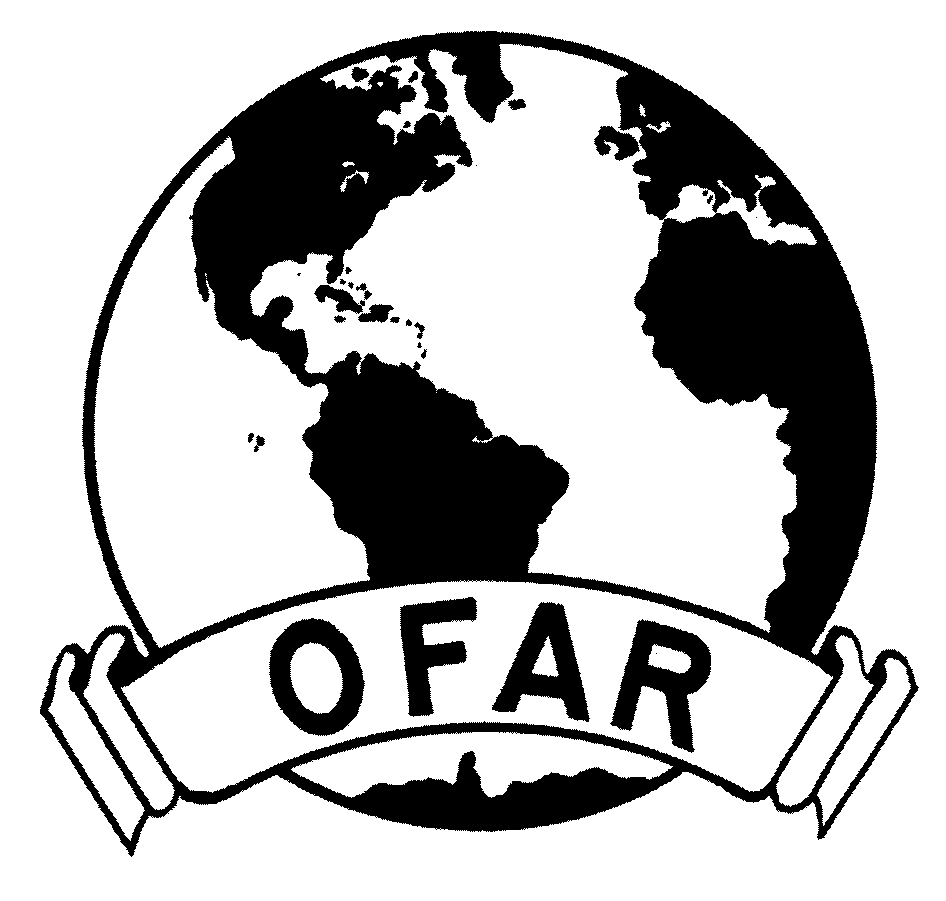
OFAR logo used 1939–1953, taken from a 1952 publication cover.

OFAR began handling food aid in 1941 when President Roosevelt and the Congress authorized $1.35 billion of food assistance to Great Britain. During this period OFAR also led negotiations that resulted in creation of the International Wheat Council, and began assisting Latin American countries to develop their agriculture. This latter effort was related to the need for strategic commodities as World War II loomed, as well as the need to tie South America closer to the Allies and thereby to keep Nazi Germany from gaining a foothold in the New World. During World War II, OFAR analyzed food availability in both allied and enemy countries, and promoted the stockpiling of 100 million bushels (2.7 million metric tons) of wheat for feeding refugees after the anticipated end of the war.

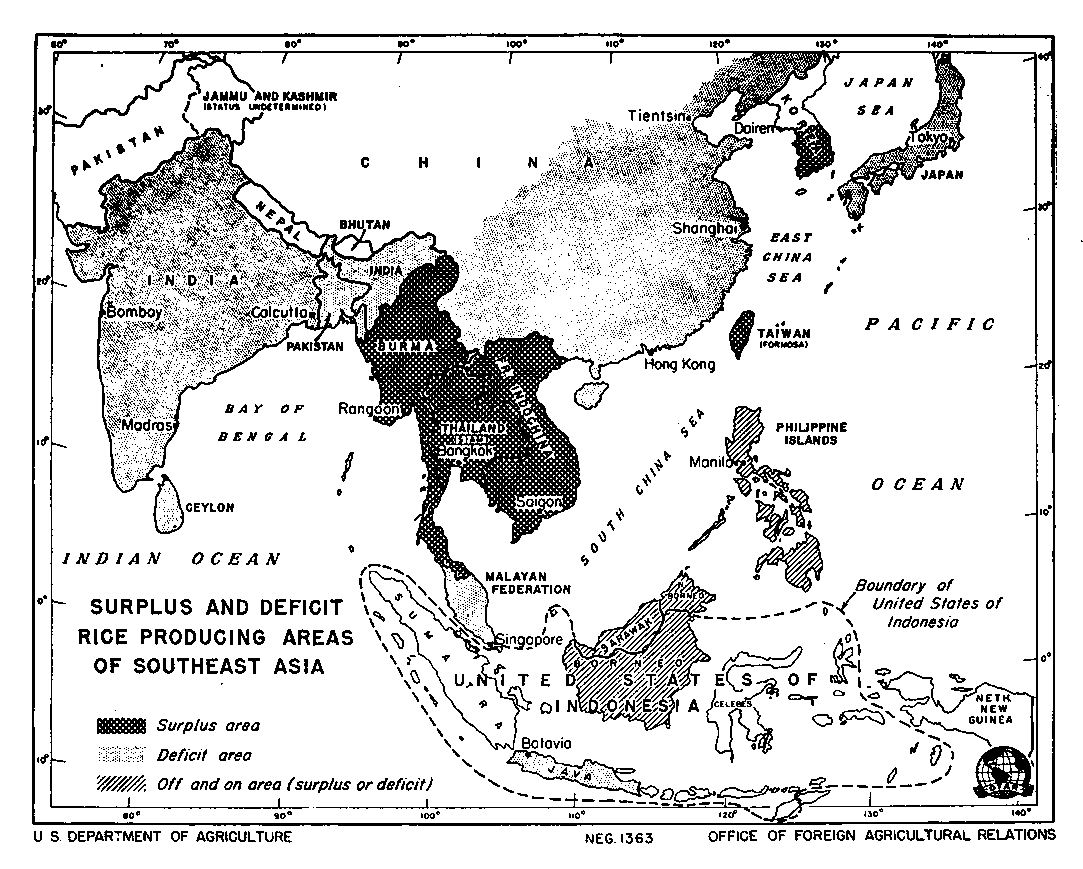
OFAR-created map of Asia, showing rice surplus and deficit areas.

After the war OFAR was instrumental in carrying out land reform in Japan and offering agricultural technical assistance under the Marshall Plan and the Point Four Program. By 1953, OFAR had roughly 400 agricultural specialists working on development programs in 27 foreign countries. OFAR also continued food aid programs, particularly using the Agricultural Act of 1949's authorities to donate surplus commodities. The intent of these efforts was first, to combat communism; second, to promote export sales of U.S. agricultural products; and third, to improve diets in foreign countries through extension of technical assistance and technology transfer.

At this point OFAR directed the work of overseas technical assistance programs while the Department of State directed the work of the agricultural attachés. Frictions began to develop as the Department of State began to deny USDA requests for information from the attachés, leading to pressure from both agricultural producer groups and influential congressmen for the attachés to be returned to USDA control.

OFAR participated actively with the Department of State in negotiating the General Agreement on Tariffs and Trade (GATT), signed in 1947 and expanded through subsequent negotiation rounds, although agriculture was not a major focus until the Uruguay Round of negotiations. At the same time, OFAR was heavily involved in founding the UN Food and Agriculture Organization, with Director of Foreign Agricultural Relations Leslie A. Wheeler playing a particularly instrumental role.

== FAS is reconstituted ==
On March 10, 1953, Secretary of Agriculture Ezra Taft Benson abolished OFAR and reconstituted the Foreign Agricultural Service. In April 1954, FAS handed off national security–related technical assistance to the International Cooperation Administration (USAID's forerunner) and began to concentrate on foreign market development for U.S. agricultural commodities, signaling a radical shift in the agency's focus. On September 1, 1954, following passage of H.R. 8033 (P.L. 83-690), the agricultural attachés were transferred back from State Department to FAS.

In the same year, Congress passed Public Law 480 (P.L. 83-480), the Food for Peace Act, which became the backbone of FAS's food aid and market development efforts. Agricultural attachés began negotiating agreements for concessional sale of U.S. farm commodities to foreign countries on terms of up to 30 years and in their own local currencies. The Act was uncommon in that it allowed for the agreements made by the FAS to bypass the normal advice and consent of the U.S. Senate.

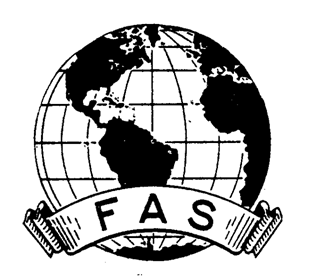
FAS logo, 1953–2003

In 1955, FAS began signing cooperative agreements with groups representing American producers of specific commodities to expand foreign demand. The first such agreement was signed with the National Cotton Council. This activity came to be called the Market Development Cooperator Program, and the groups themselves to be called "cooperators".

In 1961, the General Sales Manager of USDA's Commodity Stabilization Service (CSS) and his staff were merged into FAS, bringing with them operational responsibility for export credit and food aid programs. In particular, the General Sales Manager was responsible for setting prices for export sale of USDA-owned surplus commodities that had been acquired through domestic farm support programs. At the same time, the CSS Barter and Stockpiling Manager was also moved to FAS. In the postwar era USDA's Commodity Credit Corporation was heavily involved in efforts to barter CCC-owned commodities acquired via domestic farm support programs for strategic commodities available from foreign countries short of hard currency. By the mid-1960s, however, as European and Asian economies recovered, the emphasis on barter waned.

In 1969, the General Sales Manager and his staff were split off to form a separate USDA agency, the Export Marketing Service (EMS). In 1974, however, EMS was re-merged with FAS. In 1977, under pressure from the Congress, the Carter Administration created an "Office of the General Sales Manager" nominally headed by the General Sales Manager, but in reality still a subunit of FAS and subordinate to the FAS Administrator. In 1981 the Ronald Reagan Administration abolished the Office of the General Sales Manager and formally restored its status as a program area of FAS. During that time, the GSM's responsibilities expanded from mere disposition of surplus commodities to management of commodity export credit guarantee programs, foreign food assistance programs, and direct credit programs.

The Foreign Agricultural Service, a foreign affairs agency since 1930, was included in the Foreign Service Act of 1980. Agricultural attachés were offered the choice of remaining civil servants or being grandfathered into the Foreign Service. Since that time the vast majority of agricultural officers overseas, just like State Department officials overseas, have been Foreign Service Officers. Since 1953, 12 former agricultural attachés have been confirmed as American Ambassadors.

== Major events ==
Trade tensions with the European Economic Community (EEC) boiled over in 1962 with the first "Chicken War", a trade dispute arising from the EEC's application of protective tariffs on poultry meat imported from the United States in retaliation for President Kennedy's imposition of a ceiling on textile imports and raising of tariffs on carpets, glass and bicycles. FAS negotiators and analysts, including future Administrator Rolland "Bud" Anderson, supported talks that resulted in the EEC paying $26 million in damages, though in Anderson's words, "We won the battle but lost the war as U.S. exports of these products to Europe soon became insignificant". The so-called "Chicken War" was a precursor to numerous other trade disputes, including the 2002 "Poultry War", when Russia retaliated against the United States' steel tariffs by barring imports of U.S. poultry meat, and the dispute over the European Union's ban on imports of U.S. beef produced from cattle treated with growth promotants.

In 1972 a short grain crop in the USSR resulted in the Soviet Union quietly concluding grain purchasing contracts from a relatively small number of the secretive private multinational grain traders who dominated world trade in cereals. Because crop surveys in mid-spring had given the impression of a normal crop, FAS's agricultural attaché in Moscow chose not to follow up with additional crop observation travel, and thus missed a severe drought that set in after the last trip. As a result of this lapse, international grain traders and exporting nations were unaware of the Soviets' dire need for massive grain imports. By the time the scope of Soviet purchases became known, the USSR had locked in supplies at low, subsidized prices, leaving other importers and consumers scrambling for what was left at significantly higher prices. This event, known as the "Great grain robbery", led to creation in the Foreign Agricultural Service of a satellite imagery unit for remote sensing of foreign crop conditions, negotiation of a long-term grain agreement (LTA) with the Soviet Union, and imposition of an export sales reporting requirement for U.S. grain exporters. It also impressed on FAS the need for "boots-on-the-ground" observation of crop conditions in critical countries.

In the 1980s, the European Economic Community (EEC) emerged as a competitor for export sales, particularly of grain. EEC export restitutions (subsidies) undercut U.S. sales, with the result that farm-state Members of Congress, led by Senator Bob Dole of Kansas, pushed through new legislation authorizing broader subsidization of commercial export sales. This Export Enhancement Program (or EEP, though it was originally called "BICEP" by Senator Dole) was used primarily to counter EEC subsidies in important markets. Use of EEP opened the United States to criticism from less developed countries on the grounds that export subsidies undercut their own farmers by depressing global commodity prices. By the mid-1990s EEP was largely abandoned in favor of negotiating for a multilateral ban on agricultural export subsidies; it was last used, for a single sale, during the Clinton administration. With founding of the World Trade Organization in January 1995, trade-distorting domestic agricultural supports were capped in all member states and absolute import quotas were banned, but negotiations on eliminating export subsidies continue still.

== Food aid ==
FAS has managed food assistance programs since 1941, and today uses a mix of statutory authorities. The traditional programs are Section 416(b) of the Agricultural Act of 1949, which makes surplus commodities available for donation overseas, and Title I of Public Law 480 (Food for Peace), which authorizes concessional sales. These programs were designed to support government-to-government transactions. The 1985 Farm Bill created the Food for Progress program, which facilitated delivery of food aid through non-governmental organizations as well as foreign governments. Food for Progress can draw on multiple sources, including in-kind surplus commodities and appropriated funds.

The most recent addition to the array of FAS-implemented food aid programs is the McGovern/Dole International Food for Education and Child Nutrition Program. Named in honor of Senator Dole and Senator George McGovern, it supports school feeding programs in less developed countries, and reserves authority for supporting maternal and child health programs. It was authorized by the 2002 Farm Bill and reauthorized in 2008. Funding sources have varied since the pilot Global Food for Education program was deployed in fiscal year 2001, often combining both appropriated funds and funding from the Commodity Credit Corporation’s borrowing authority.

== International development and national security ==
The FAS Millennium logo, 2003–2013, based in part on the USDA "rolling fields" logo

After a nine-year hiatus from international agricultural development work at USDA, on July 12, 1963, Secretary Orville Freeman ordered creation of an International Agricultural Development Service (IADS), which was subordinate to the same Assistant Secretary of Agriculture as but separate from FAS. IADS served as USDA's liaison with USAID and other assistance organizations, linking them to USDA expertise in pursuit of developmental goals. Matthew Drosdoff was hired effective February 19, 1964, to be the first permanent Administrator of IADS. In March 1969, after the Richard Nixon Administration came to power, IADS was briefly merged into FAS, then in November 1969 was split out into a separate Foreign Economic Development Service (FEDS). On February 6, 1972, FEDS was abolished and its functions transferred to the Economic Research Service, where it became the Foreign Development Division.

In 1977, Quentin West proposed consolidating three USDA units involved in technical assistance and development work into a single agency to be called the Office of International Cooperation and Development: the Foreign Development Division, the Science and Education Administration, an interagency consortium funded by foreign currency earnings, and FAS' International Organization Affairs Staff. West's proposal was accepted and thus OICD was created, with responsibility for technical assistance, training, foreign currency-funded research, and international organization liaison. In 1994, USDA's Office of International Cooperation and Development was merged with FAS, bringing technical assistance back to FAS after a 40-year absence.

In 2003, FAS posted agricultural officers to Baghdad, not for the by-then traditional purposes of market intelligence and market development, but to reconstruct the Iraqi Ministry of Agriculture. FAS also began organizing USDA contributions to Provincial Reconstruction Teams in Iraq and Afghanistan. This marked FAS' return to national security work. Then-Secretary of Agriculture Tom Vilsack pledged to continue and to expand that work. FAS' role in national security work, however, remains controversial.

== Heads of Service and Ambassadors ==
=== Heads of Service ===
From 1930 to about 1934, division heads in USDA, including the heads of the Foreign Agricultural Service Division, had no formal title, but were referred to as "In-charge", though the Official Register of the United States Government listed them as "Chief". Beginning around 1934 and until 1938, the head of FASD was called the "Chief". When FAS was renamed in 1938, the head was titled "Director", and that title carried over into OFAR and then the renewed FAS until 1954. The first head of FAS to bear the title "Administrator" was William Lodwick in that year. Heads of the Foreign Agricultural Service and Office of Foreign Agricultural Relations since 1930 have been (periods as acting head are in italics):

Name	Term	Agency
Asher Hobson	1930–1931	Foreign Agricultural Service Division; Bureau of Agricultural Economics
Leslie A. Wheeler	1931–1934, 1934–1938	Foreign Agricultural Service Division; Bureau of Agricultural Economics
Leslie A. Wheeler	1938–1939	Foreign Agricultural Service
Leslie A. Wheeler	1939–1948	Office of Foreign Agricultural Relations
Dennis A. FitzGerald	1948–1949	Office of Foreign Agricultural Relations
Fred J. Rossiter	1949	Office of Foreign Agricultural Relations
Stanley Andrews	1949–1952	Office of Foreign Agricultural Relations
Francis A. Flood	1952	Office of Foreign Agricultural Relations
John J. Haggerty	1952–1953	Office of Foreign Agricultural Relations
Francis R. Wilcox	1953	Office of Foreign Agricultural Relations
Romeo Ennis Short	1953	Foreign Agricultural Service
Clayton E. Whipple	1953–1954	Foreign Agricultural Service
William G. Lodwick	1954–1955	Foreign Agricultural Service
Gwynn Garnett	1955–1958	Foreign Agricultural Service
Maxwell S. Myers	1958–1961	Foreign Agricultural Service
Robert C. Tetro	1961–1962	Foreign Agricultural Service
Raymond A. Ioanes	1962–1973	Foreign Agricultural Service
David L. Hume	1973–1977	Foreign Agricultural Service
Thomas R. Hughes	1977–1981	Foreign Agricultural Service
Richard A. Smith	1981–1985	Foreign Agricultural Service
Thomas O. Kay	1985–1989	Foreign Agricultural Service
Rolland E. Anderson	1989–1991	Foreign Agricultural Service
Duane C. Acker	1991–1992	Foreign Agricultural Service
Stephen L. Censky	1992–1993	Foreign Agricultural Service
Richard B. Schroeter	1993–1994	Foreign Agricultural Service
August Schumacher, Jr.	1994–1997	Foreign Agricultural Service
Lon S. Hatamiya	1997–1999	Foreign Agricultural Service
Timothy J. Galvin	1999–2001	Foreign Agricultural Service
Mattie R. Sharpless	2001	Foreign Agricultural Service
Mary T. Chambliss	2001–2002	Foreign Agricultural Service
A. Ellen Terpstra	2002–2006	Foreign Agricultural Service
Michael W. Yost	2006–2009	Foreign Agricultural Service
Suzanne K. Hale	2009	Foreign Agricultural Service
Michael V. Michener	2009	Foreign Agricultural Service
John D. Brewer	2010–2011	Foreign Agricultural Service
Suzanne E. Heinen	2011–2012, 2012–2013	Foreign Agricultural Service
Philip C. Karsting	2013–2017	Foreign Agricultural Service
Holly Higgins	2017–2018	Foreign Agricultural Service
James Higgiston	2018	Foreign Agricultural Service
Ken Isley	2018–2021	Foreign Agricultural Service
Daniel Whitley	2021, 2021–present	Foreign Agricultural Service

=== General Sales Managers ===
General Sales Managers since 1955 have been (periods as acting GSM are in italics):

Name	Term	Agency
Francis C. Daniels	1955–1959	Commodity Stabilization Service
Sylvester J. Meyers	1959–1961	ditto
Frank LeRoux	1961–1966	Foreign Agricultural Service
James A. Hutchins, Jr.	1966–1967, 1968–1969	ditto
George Parks	1967–1968	ditto
Clifford Pulvermacher	1969–1972	Export Marketing Service
Laurel Meade	1972–1974	ditto
George S. Shanklin	1974	Foreign Agricultural Service
James Hutchinson	1974–1977	ditto
Kelly Harrison	1977–1981	ditto
Alan Tracy	1981–1982	ditto
Melvin Sims	1982–1989	ditto
F. Paul Dickerson	1989–1991	ditto
Christopher E. Goldthwait	1991–1993, 1993–1999	ditto
Richard Fritz	1999–2001	ditto
Mary T. Chambliss	2001	ditto
Franklin D. Lee	2001–2002	ditto
W. Kirk Miller	2002–2009	ditto
Patricia R. Sheikh	2009	ditto
John D. Brewer	2009	ditto
Christian Foster	2010	ditto
Janet A. Nuzum	2010–2011	ditto
Suzanne E. Heinen	2011–2013	ditto
Philip C. Karsting	2013–2014	ditto
Asif J. Chaudhry	2014–2015	ditto
Suzanne Palmieri	2015–2016	ditto
Allison Thomas	2016–2017	ditto
Bryce Quick	2017	ditto
Bobby Richey	2018	ditto
Clay Hamilton	2018–2023	ditto
Brooke Jamison	2023-	ditto

=== Heads of International Development ===
Administrators of the Office of International Cooperation and Development and its predecessors from creation until it was merged with FAS in 1994 were (periods as acting Administrator are in italics):

Name	Term	Agency
Matthew Drosdoff	1964–1966	International Agricultural Development Service
Lester R. Brown	1966–1969	ditto
Quentin West	1969–1972	Foreign Economic Development Service
Quentin West	1972–1977	Foreign Development Division, Economic Research Service
Quentin West	1977–1980	Office of International Cooperation and Development
Ruth Zagorin	1980–1981	ditto
Joan S. Wallace	1981–1989	ditto
Robert Scherle	1989–1990	ditto
Steve Abrams	1990	ditto
Duane Acker	1990–1992	ditto
John Miranda	1992–1993	ditto
Lynnett M. Wagner	1993–1994	ditto

=== Ambassadors ===
Agricultural officers who have served or are serving as Ambassadors are:

Name	Agricultural Posts	Ambassadorships, Presidential Appointments, Significant Appointments
Lester D. Mallory	assistant agricultural commissioner, Marseille and Paris; agricultural attaché, Paris and Mexico City	Jordan, 1953–1958, Guatemala, 1958–1959, Deputy Assistant Secretary of State, 1960
Charles R. Burrows	assistant agricultural attaché (rank of vice consul), Buenos Aires	Honduras, 1960–1965
Howard R. Cottam	agricultural economist, Paris; agricultural attaché, Rome	Kuwait, 1963–1969
Clarence A. Boonstra	assistant agricultural attaché, Havana; agricultural attaché, Manila, Buenos Aires, Rio de Janeiro and Lima	Costa Rica, 1967–1969
Philip Habib	agricultural attaché (vice consul), Ottawa and Wellington	South Korea 1971–1974; Assistant Secretary of State for East Asian and Pacific Affairs 1974–1976; Under Secretary of State for Political Affairs 1976–1978; Acting Secretary of State 1977; Special Negotiator for the Middle East 1981; winner of the Presidential Medal of Freedom 1982; featured on a postage stamp 2006
H. Reiter Webb	assistant agricultural attaché, London; agricultural attaché, Cairo	Chief Negotiator for Textile Matters with rank of Ambassador 1979–1981 (not confirmed by the Senate)
George S. Vest	agricultural attaché (vice consul), Quito	European Community 1981–1985, Director General of the Foreign Service 1985–1989
Christopher E. Goldthwait	assistant agricultural attaché, Bonn; agricultural attaché and counselor at Lagos	Chad 1999–2004
Mattie R. Sharpless	administrative assistant, Paris (OECD); assistant agricultural attaché, Brussels USEC; agricultural attaché, Bern; agricultural counselor, Rome; agricultural minister-counselor, Paris	Central African Republic 2001–2002
Suzanne K. Hale	agricultural attaché and agricultural trade officer, Tokyo; agricultural minister-counselor, Beijing and Tokyo	Federated States of Micronesia 2004–2007
Patricia M. Haslach	agricultural attaché, New Delhi	Laos 2004–2007, APEC 2008–2009, Coordinator for Assistance Transition in Iraq (with ambassadorial rank) 2009–2010, Deputy Coordinator for Diplomacy, Office of the Coordinator for the Global Hunger and Food Security Initiative, 2010–2013, Ethiopia 2013–2016, acting Assistant Secretary of State for Economic and Business Affairs, 2016–2018
Asif J. Chaudhry	agricultural attaché, Warsaw; senior agricultural attaché, counselor, and acting minister-counselor, Moscow; agricultural minister-counselor, Cairo	Moldova 2008–2011, Foreign Policy Advisor to the Chief of Naval Operations, 2011–2014
Allan Mustard	agricultural attaché, Moscow; agricultural trade officer, Istanbul; agricultural counselor, Vienna; agricultural minister-counselor, Moscow, Mexico City, and New Delhi	Turkmenistan, 2015–2019

== See also ==
- Agricultural attaché
- Agricultural Trade Act of 1978
- Canadian Caper
- Chief Agricultural Negotiator
- Commissioner
- Commodity Credit Corporation
- Dennis A. FitzGerald
- Foreign Agricultural Trade System of the United States
- Foreign Market Development Program
- Iowa Hog Lift
- Leslie A. Wheeler
- Market Access Program
- Stanley Andrews
- Targeted Export Assistance Program
- Under Secretary of Agriculture for Farm and Foreign Agricultural Services
- Unified Export Strategy
- United States Department of Agriculture
- United States Foreign Service
- Wolf Ladejinsky

== Bibliography ==
- Clem, Alan L. (July 1960). The U.S. Agricultural Attaché, His History and His Work, FAS M-91. Washington: USDA Foreign Agricultural Service.
- Crawford, Douglas M. (1964). "Our Agricultural Attachés". Farmer's World. Washington: U.S. Govt. Print. Off. Archived from the original on January 10, 2016.
- Estabrook, Leon M. (1936). Life of an American: Memoirs of Leon M. Estabrook. Washington: unpublished manuscript, held in Special Collections, National Agricultural Library, call number 120 Es8 R. Archived from the original on December 1, 2017.
- FAS Letter. Washington: newsletter of the Foreign Agricultural Service. 1957–1977. Archived from the original on September 27, 2009.
- Howard, James O.; Vernon Harness; Jimmy D. Minyard; Richard E. Passig (1989). Partners in Developing Farm Markets Overseas. Washington: U.S. Agricultural Export Development Council. Archived from the original on December 1, 2017.
- Hutson, John B. (1953). Reminiscences of John B. Hutson. New York: Oral History Collection of Columbia University. Archived from the original on July 25, 2011.
- Luttrell, Clifton B. (October 1973). The Russian Wheat Deal – Hindsight vs. Foresight (PDF). St. Louis: Federal Reserve Bank of St. Louis.
- Mayer, Martin (1983). The Diplomats. New York: Doubleday. ISBN 978-0-385-14230-4.
- Morgan, Dan (2000). Merchants of Grain: The Power and Profits of the Five Giant Companies at the Center of the World's Food Supply. iUniverse. p. 424. ISBN 978-0-595-14210-1.
- Mustard, Allan (2003). A study of management doctrines and leadership philosophies of selected organizations with international missions. Arlington, Virginia: Foreign Agricultural Service, U.S. Dept. of Agriculture. pp. vi, 85 leaves : col. ill., 28 cm. Archived from the original on October 19, 2015.
- "Official Register of the United States Government". Official Register of the United States Government (Various Issues) (1883, 1885, 1889, 1891, 1893, 1899, 1901, 1903, 1905, 1907, 1925–1959). Washington: USGPO.
- Olsen, Nils. Papers of Nils Olsen. special collections of the Iowa State University Library: unpublished. Archived from the original on April 10, 2009.
- Taylor, Henry Charles; Anne Dewees Taylor (1952). The Story of Agricultural Economics in the United States, 1840–1932. Ames: Iowa State College Press. p. 1121. ISBN 978-0-8371-7653-6. Archived from the original on December 1, 2017.
- U.S. Department of Agriculture (1883–1885). Report of the Commissioner of Agriculture. Washington: USGPO.
- "Report of the Secretary of Agriculture". U.S. Department of Agriculture (1893, 1903, 1905, 1920, 1922, 1931–1939, 1952–1954). Washington: USGPO.
- U.S. Department of State. Biographic Register. Washington: USGPO. LCCN 09022072.
- U.S. Department of State (April 19, 2006). Foreign Relations of the United States. Washington: USGPO.
- U.S. Department of State. Foreign Service List. Washington: USGPO. LCCN 10016369.
- Wheeler, Leslie A. (1940). Reciprocal Trade Agreements—A New Method Of Tariff Making (Yearbook of Agriculture, 1940, pp. 585–595). Washington: USGPO.
- Wheeler, Leslie A. (1952). Reminiscences of Leslie A. Wheeler. New York: Oral History Collection of Columbia University.
