= Foreign Market Development Program =

United States agricultural export promotion program

The Foreign Market Development Cooperator Program (FMDP or Cooperator Program) is one of the agricultural export promotion programs operated by the United States Department of Agriculture (USDA) Foreign Agricultural Service. This program is a joint government-agri-industry effort to develop markets by acquainting potential foreign customers with U.S. farm products. Activities under this program include providing technical assistance to prospective foreign buyers, overseas food exhibits, product demonstrations and advertising aimed at foreign consumers. FAS shares the financing of these projects with the cooperators, which are nonprofit commodity trade associations primarily composed of producer-based farm groups.
