= Asher Hobson =

American agricultural economist (1889–1992)

Asher Hobson (born November 26, 1889, in Quenemo, Osage County, Kansas; died February 29, 1992, in Blue Mounds, Dane County, Wisconsin) was an American agricultural economist.

== Life ==
=== Education and personal life ===
Asher Hobson graduated in 1913 with a bachelor of arts from the University of Kansas. He studied agricultural economics at the University of Wisconsin-Madison, where in 1915 he obtained a master's degree. In 1931, he obtained a doctorate in political sciences from the Graduate Institute of International Studies in Geneva. Hobson in 1937 took over Little Norway, a living museum of a Norwegian village located in Blue Mounds, Wisconsin, listed on the National Register of Historic Places.

=== Professional life ===
Hobson got his first position as research assistant in agriculture economics at the University of Wisconsin-Madison in 1914, which he occupied until 1916. In 1917 was appointed state director of markets in Washington, D.C. In 1920 he was named assistant chief of the Office of Farm Management with the U.S. Department of Agriculture. He also took on an associate professorship of economic agriculture at Columbia University.

In 1922, Asher Hobson moved to Rome as a U.S. delegate to the International Institute of Agriculture, and in 1929 he returned to Washington D.C. to take the position of consulting economist to the Federal Farm Board. In 1930, he was appointed chief of Division of Foreign Agriculture Service at U.S. Department of Agriculture. In 1931, Hobson accepted a professorship in agricultural economics at the University of Wisconsin-Madison, where a year later he was appointed head of the department of agricultural economics, a position he kept until 1948. He retired from the University of Wisconsin-Madison in 1953. Beginning in 1948, he was also a member of the Committee of Agriculture, Nutrition and Forestry of the United States Senate.

Hobson was one of the leading U.S. agricultural economists of his times. He was a member of the American Economic Association, the Agricultural & Applied Economics Association, the International Association of Agricultural Economists, the Inter-American Institute for Cooperation on Agriculture, and the honor society of Phi Kappa Phi and the Delta Sigma Rho.

== Publications (selected) ==
- Can prices be controlled? : lesson O., American Institute of Agriculture, Chicago, Ill., 1923
- Agricultural economics in Europe. A survey of the teaching, research, and extension activities in agricultural economics in European countries, Rome, 1926
- Report on the Work of the Agricultural Commission of the International Economic Conference, Geneva, May 4 to 23, 1927, Rome, 1927
- Memorandum on the second session of the Economic Consultative Committee of the League of Nations, 1929
- Report on the Fifteenth International Congress of Agriculture Held in Prague, Czechoslovakia, June 5-8, 1931, 1931
- The International Institute of Agriculture; an historical and critical analysis of its organization, activities and policies of administration, in: University of California publications in international relations., volume II, University of California Press, Berkeley, Calif., 1931
- Cooperation Principles and Practices: The Application of Cooperation to the Assembling, Processing, and Marketing of Farm Products; to the Purchase of Farm and Household Supplies; and to the Providing of Such Services as Credit, Insurance, Artificial Breeding and Rural Electric Power, in: Circular 420, Extension Service of the University of Wisconsin, Madison, Wis., 1952

== Literature ==
- Jaques Cattell Press.: American men of science; a biographical directory, volume III, Bowker, New York, 1956, S. 309.
- Who was who in America. : volume VIII, 1982-1985 with world notables, Marquis Who's Who, Chicago, Ill., 1985, S. 190.
- John Mark Hansen: Gaining access : Congress and the farm lobby, 1919-1981, University of Chicago Press, Chicago, Ill., 1991, S. 26.
- Ira Lawrence Baldwin, Donna Taylor Hartshorne: My half century at the University of Wisconsin, Privately published by Ira L. Baldwin, Madison, Wis., 1995, S. 161, 162, 558.
