= Agricultural attaché =

Type of diplomat

An agricultural attaché is a diplomat who collects, analyzes, and acts on information on agriculture, agribusiness, food, and other related spheres in a foreign country or countries. Agricultural attachés may be directly employed by the sending country's agriculture ministry, or they may be employed by the foreign ministry. Typical activities of an agricultural attaché include reporting on crop conditions, food availability, domestic agricultural policy and the foreign trade outlook in agricultural products; negotiating food aid agreements and agricultural credit lines; implementing agricultural technical assistance programs; facilitating professional contacts, exchanges, and technology transfer; assisting in negotiating bilateral and multilateral trade agreements; and promoting the exports of agricultural and food products. In many cases, agricultural attachés may also bear responsibility for issues related to the environment, food security, food safety, fisheries, forestry, and indeed anything related to rural areas and the rural economy.

== Diplomatic status ==
The emergence of agricultural attachés with diplomatic status grew out of the posting of agricultural commissioners in the 19th century. In modern times, although the term "agricultural attaché" is commonly applied to diplomats responsible for agricultural affairs, these diplomats often possess other, higher diplomatic titles and ranks, up to and including the rank of minister-counselor.

Often, agricultural officers of foreign embassies will form an informal group to compare notes and to collaborate on issues of mutual interest with regard to the host country. In Washington, D.C., for example, foreign embassies' agricultural attachés created the Agricultural Counselors Forum in the 1970s.

== Responsibilities ==
Originally, agricultural attachés primarily bore responsibility for reporting on agricultural and rural conditions in the host country and other countries in a multi-country area of responsibility. In 1934, U.S. agricultural attachés began supporting trade negotiations. During and after World War II, their responsibilities expanded to include oversight and management of food assistance, credit, and technical assistance programs.

Today an "agricultural attaché" may have other responsibilities as well, related to environmental affairs, arrangement of international credit lines, or consumer protection. For example, in Washington, D.C., the Austrian Embassy features a "Counselor (Agriculture and Environment)", the Royal Thai Embassy has an officer responsible for "Organic Food and Agriculture", and the German Embassy includes a minister-counselor for "Food, Agriculture and Consumer Protection".

In virtually all cases, agricultural attachés fall under authority of the chief of the diplomatic mission (ambassador or chargé d'affaires) so that in addition to answering to their respective agriculture ministries, they also must report to the chief of mission. As an example, under U.S. law, this dual line of authority is attested in Title 7, Chapter 87, Subchapter V of the U.S. Code and U.S. Department of Agriculture regulation DR-1051-001, in which the attachés are subordinated to the Secretary of Agriculture, and in Title 22, Chapter 52, Section 3927 of the U.S. Code, in which they are subordinated to the chief of mission.

== Services ==
=== Australia ===
The Australian Department of Agriculture, Fisheries and Forestry (DAFF) has 12 agricultural officers in 12 diplomatic missions abroad. According to the DAFF official website,

These officers:

- play a major part in Australia's efforts to remove or lower market access barriers and facilitate trade
- monitor emerging international issues
- help resolve quarantine issues
- provide briefings and assist with visiting delegations.

The current roster of agricultural officers can be found here.

=== Austria ===
The Austrian Ministry of Agriculture (often colloquially called in German "Das Lebensministerium", or "Ministry of Life") posts "agricultural and environmental attachés" to 7 countries as well as the headquarters of the European Union in Brussels. Some of these officers have regional responsibilities, covering more than one country. According to the ministry's official website,

In addition to their bilateral tasks (they inform the Ministry of Life about current environmental and agricultural affairs), some attachés are also responsible for representing the Ministry of Life at several international organisations like the OECD, FAO, or the United Nations. They are the contact persons at bilateral visits and events and cultivate the contacts in the Ministries in charge of agricultural and technical affairs of the relevant countries. In the course of the EU enlargement the responsibilities of the attachés in the new Member States have further developed. Through regular market reports they become a link between the Ministry of Life, the foreign trade commission of the Austrian Federal Economic Chamber and producers from the agriculture and food sector. They will then serve as clearing agencies and contact partners in marketing issues for enterprises from these sectors.

=== Canada ===
Agriculture and Agri-Food Canada operates the Agri-Food Trade Service "to support agricultural productivity and trade in an industry that recorded exports of $31.5 billion in 2007...the Agri-Food Trade Service (ATS) was established to support various agriculture and agri-food sector clients, including Canadian food exporters."

Canadian agricultural attachés posted abroad, though typically selected by and from the ranks of Agriculture and Agri-Food Canada, do not however work for the Agri-Food Trade Service, but rather as employees of the Canadian Trade Commissioner Service (TCS), and are listed on the rosters of these commissioners maintained by the Department of Foreign Affairs and International Trade.

=== China ===
The Chinese Ministry of Agriculture posts agricultural officers to the United States, the Philippines, European Union, WTO, FAO, Brazil, India, Japan, France, and Australia. According to the ministry's website, one of the mandates of the ministry is to "undertake foreign-related agricultural affairs and organize related international economic and technical exchanges and cooperation."

=== European Union ===
The European Union, a regional bloc, both sends and accredits agricultural attachés. The European Union's delegation list for its mission in Washington, D.C., for example, includes an agricultural counselor and first secretary for agriculture in the "Trade & Agriculture Section". Conversely, many countries post agricultural attachés to Brussels to represent their interests before the European Commission, including members states of the European Union.

In the latter case, member states' attachés assigned to a Permanent Representation to the European Union perform a fundamentally different function from that of bilateral attachés. They do not cover bilateral relations between two countries, but rather participate in EU decision-making and implementation procedures, contributing to coordination and working out of national positions, representing those positions, and preparing and attending relevant (Council and comitology) meetings.

=== France ===
The French Ministry of Food, Agriculture and Fisheries maintains an extensive network of agricultural attachés abroad, with representatives to three international organizations (World Trade Organization, Food and Agriculture Organization, and United Nations Industrial Development Organization), to the European Union, as well as to over 90 bilateral diplomatic missions.

According to the French Ministry of Food, Agriculture and Fisheries official website,

Counselors or attachés have the agricultural business tasks:

- Observe, monitor and analyze the positions of countries in which they are located as to national, EU and international agricultural, fisheries, trade and veterinary and phytosanitary regulations
- Inform the French authorities and especially the Ministry of Food, Agriculture and Fisheries, on the changing positions of the countries concerned on the common agricultural policy issues including forest policy, common fisheries, veterinary and phytosanitary regulations and international negotiations directly or indirectly on these issues (WTO, OECD ...)
- Facilitate dialogue between French authorities and the countries of its area of responsibility,
- To promote French positions to the governments of such countries on the Common Agricultural Policy, geographic appellations, multilateral trade negotiations,
- Encourage the development of agri-food trade of France to the countries in which located, which includes a precise knowledge of regulations applicable to trade and food, assistance to operators facing difficulties with the authorities of countries concerned,
- Develop an influence strategy (sustainable development, safety...).

Counselors or attachés for agricultural affairs are under the authority of the chief of the economics section at the Embassy of France in the country concerned.

=== Germany ===
The Federal Republic of Germany's Ministry of Nutrition, Agriculture and Consumer Protection has agricultural attachés in 18 diplomatic missions.

=== Hungary ===
The Hungarian Ministry of Agriculture and Rural Development (MARD) and the Ministry of Foreign Affairs (MFA) maintain agricultural attachés in nine countries: Germany, the United States of America (also accredited to Canada), Russia (also accredited to Armenia and Uzbekistan), Italy (also an FAO representation), France, Belgium (Permanent Representation to the European Union), Spain, China, and Romania. The attachés are in the employ of the MFA but MARD directs their work.

MARD encourages submission of attaché reports that contribute significantly to the decisions of farmers and their organizations as well as other actors in the agricultural sector and the food industry. MARD has published a monthly Newsletter (Külhoni Hírlevél) compiled from open information in the reports since 2004.

=== Mexico ===
The Mexican Secretariat of Agriculture, Livestock, Rural Development, Fisheries and Food (SAGARPA) maintains agricultural attachés in 5 diplomatic missions. They are charged with responsibility for "identification of export demand, market information, organization of trade missions and promotion missions for Mexican agricultural and food products."

=== Netherlands ===
The Ministry of Agriculture, Nature and Food Quality (MinLNV) of the Netherlands includes a Foreign Agricultural Service which posts agricultural attachés to more than 40 overseas locations. According to the ministry, the service's officers "are trained to assist Dutch agricultural small and medium-sized enterprises in their activities on foreign markets. The Agricultural Offices abroad also function as a liaison between Dutch agriculture, food, agri-business, fisheries, nature management organisations and agricultural research institutions and their counterparts."

=== Philippines ===
The Department of Agriculture of the Philippines posts agricultural attachés to 6 countries.

=== Russian Federation ===
The Russian Ministry of Agriculture's Federal Center for Development of Exports of the Agroindustrial Complex's Products (Russian: Федеральный центр развития экспорта продукции АПК Минсельхоза России) administers Russia's agricultural attaché service. As of 2020 Russia maintained agricultural attachés in 25 countries with the intent of expanding coverage to 50 countries. Officially, Russian agricultural attachés are referred to as "attachés for the agroindustrial complex". As of 2020 Russia had posted "agroindustrial" attachés to Algeria, Angola, Chile, China, Egypt, Ethiopia, Ghana, Indonesia, Iraq, Israel, Jordan, Lebanon, Malaysia, Mexico, Morocco, Nigeria, Peru, Saudi Arabia, South Africa, South Korea, Sudan, Thailand, Tunisia, United Arab Emirates, and Vietnam.

=== United States ===
The United States Department of Agriculture (USDA) includes a Foreign Agricultural Service (FAS) created in 1930, but with a history reaching back to the mid-19th century. FAS staffs 103 offices in 82 countries around the world, and also monitors and reports on the agricultural trade matters of an additional 70 countries. These numbers include offices for conduct of foreign agricultural relations with the World Trade Organization in Geneva, the United Nations organizations in Rome, and the European Union Commission in Brussels. The majority of reports written by U.S. agricultural attachés are posted to the Foreign Agricultural Service website and are available to the general public.

The Secretary of Agriculture determined that overseas officials of the Animal and Plant Health Inspection Service (APHIS) should also be afforded the benefits of the Foreign Service Act of 1980. Accordingly, APHIS officers are also titled agricultural attachés. In addition, other USDA employees, notably of the Agricultural Research Service and the Forest Service, are periodically posted abroad with this diplomatic status.

== Agricultural attachés in popular culture ==
- The U.S. agricultural attaché in Tehran, Iran during the Canadian Caper, H. Lee Schatz, was featured in the motion picture Argo.

== See also ==
- Chief Agricultural Negotiator
