= Food for Progress Program =

The Food for Progress Program (FFP) is a food aid program originally authorized by the Food Security Act of 1985 (P.L. 99–198) to provide commodities on credit terms or on a grant basis to developing countries and emerging democracies to assist in the introduction of elements of free enterprise into the countries' agricultural economies. Commodities may be provided under authority of P.L. 480 (Title I) or Section 416(b). The Commodity Credit Corporation (CCC) may purchase commodities for use in Food for Progress if the commodities are currently not held in CCC inventory. The 2002 farm bill (P.L. 107–171) extended authority for the FFP through 2007. In March 2019, the FAS announced $155 million in funding for the Food for Progress Program.
