= Market Access Program =

The Market Access Program (MAP; formerly the Market Promotion Program) is administered by the Foreign Agricultural Service and uses funds from the Commodity Credit Corporation (CCC). It helps producers, exporters, private companies, and other trade organizations finance promotional activities for agricultural products of the United States. MAP is designed to encourage development, maintenance, and expansion of commercial agricultural export markets. As such, it is considered to be a World Trade Organization "Green Box" program. Activities financed include consumer promotions, market research, technical assistance, and trade servicing.

The Export Incentive Program, which is part of MAP, helps United States commercial entities conduct brand promotion activities including advertising, trade shows, in-store demonstrations, and trade seminars. MAP was authorized through 2012 by the 2008 Farm Bill (P.L. 110–246). The program promotes exports of specific United States-produced commodities and products to specific markets. Under MAP, program participants are reimbursed for their expenses in carrying out approved promotional activities. Participating organizations include nonprofit trade associations, state regional trade groups, farmer cooperatives and small businesses. Funding authority was limited to $100 million in fiscal year 2002, rising gradually to $200 million each in fiscal years 2006 through 2010.

== See also ==
- Export subsidy
