= Flex acreage =

The Omnibus Budget Reconciliation Act of 1990 mandated that deficiency payments not be made on 15% of a farm’s crop acreage base, called normal flex acres. The acreage could be planted to any program crop (called flexing), but not fruits and vegetables. An additional 10% of the farm’s base acreage could be flexed at the option of the operator. Flexing did not diminish the crop acreage base of a farm. The 1996 farm bill (P.L. 104-127) effectively provided total flexibility among all commodities, except for fruits and vegetables, and this policy was continued by the 2002 farm bill (P.L. 101-171, Sec. 1106).
