= Wheat production in the United States =

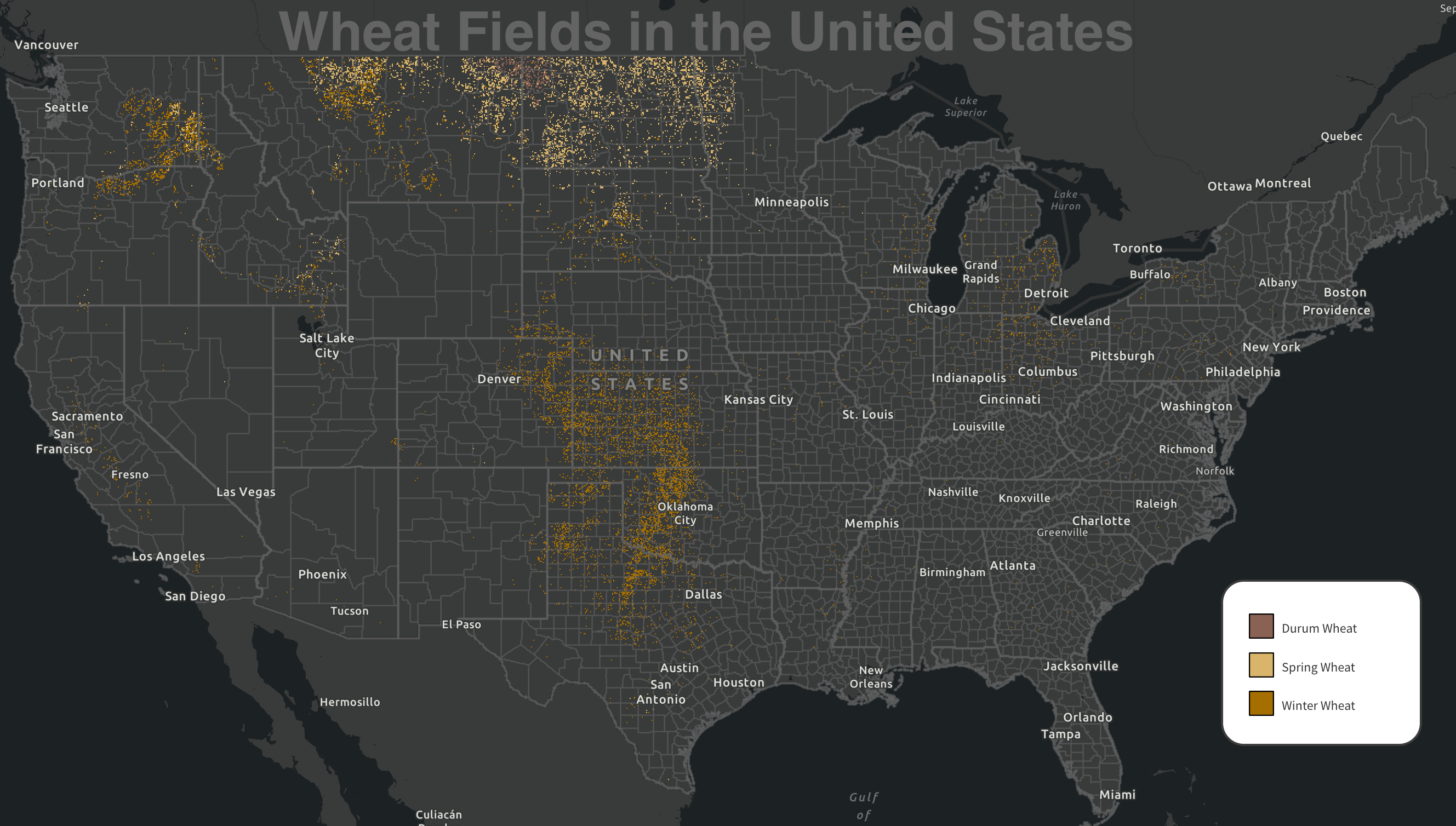
Wheat fields in the United States

Wheat is produced in almost every state in the United States, and is one of the most grown grains in the country. The type and quantity vary between regions. The US is ranked fourth in production volume of wheat, with almost 50 million tons produced in 2020, behind only China, India and Russia. The US is ranked first in crop export volume; almost 50% of its total wheat production is exported.

The United States Department of Agriculture defines eight official classes of wheat: durum wheat, hard red spring wheat, hard red winter wheat, soft red winter wheat, hard white wheat, soft white wheat, unclassed wheat, and mixed wheat. Winter wheat accounts for 70 to 80 percent of total production in the US, with the largest amounts produced in Kansas (10.8 million tons) and North Dakota (9.8 million tons). The US hard red spring wheat crop is exported to over 70 countries each year, account for 55% of its harvest. Of the total wheat produced in the country, 50% is exported, valued at US$9 billion.

== History ==
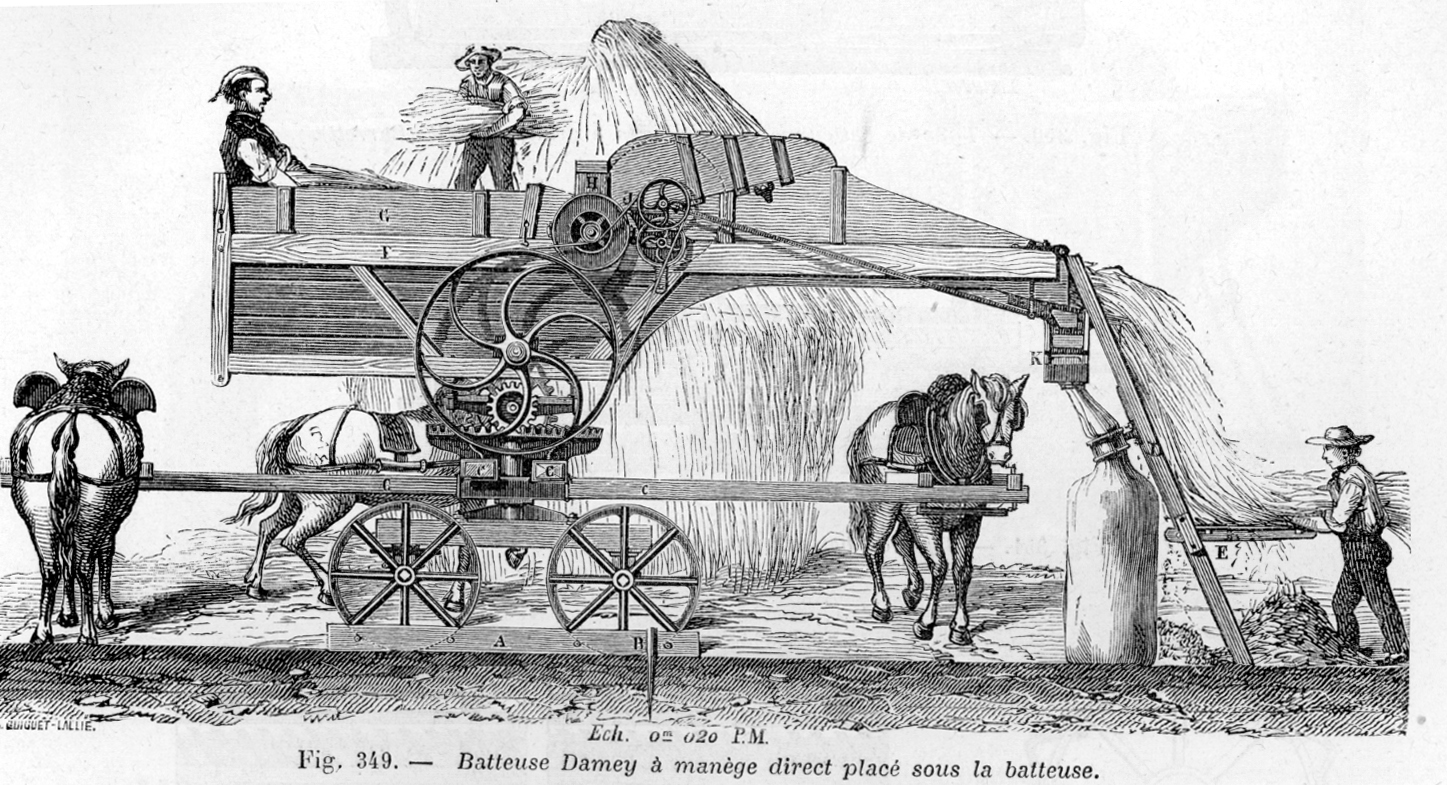
The horse-powered thresher; it removes the inedible chaff from the wheat kernels (c. 1881)

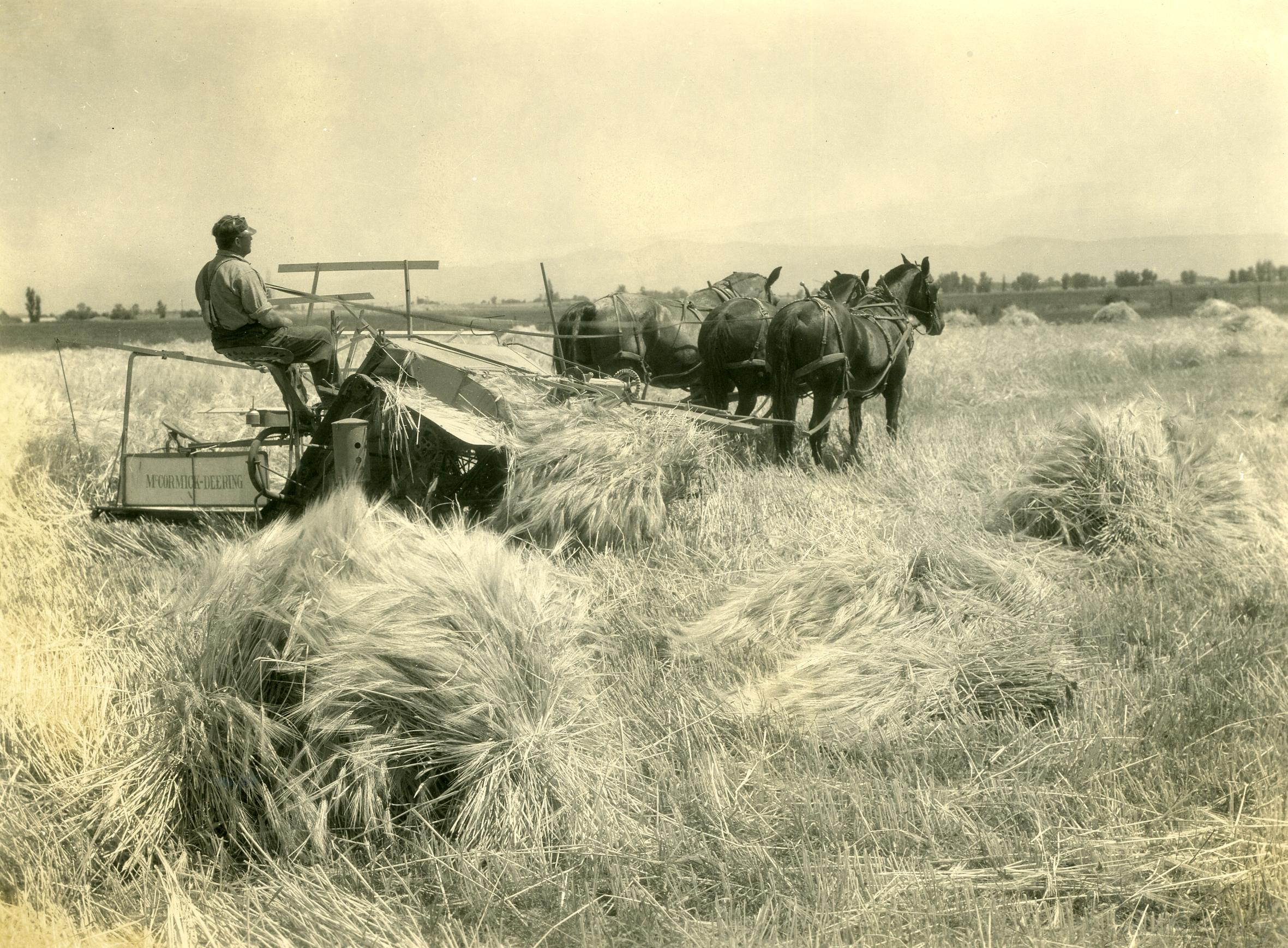
Boise Valley, Idaho, wheat field (c. 1920)

According to Ricardo Alegría, wheat was first cultivated in New Spain by Afro-Spanish conquistador Juan Garrido in the 16th century.

Although it was first introduced to the Western Hemisphere soon after the discovery of the New World, wheat came to be grown in North American soil only during the colonial period. During the colonial period, wheat was sown by broadcasting, reaped by sickles, and threshed by flails. The kernels were then taken to a grist mill for grinding into flour.

=== 19th century ===
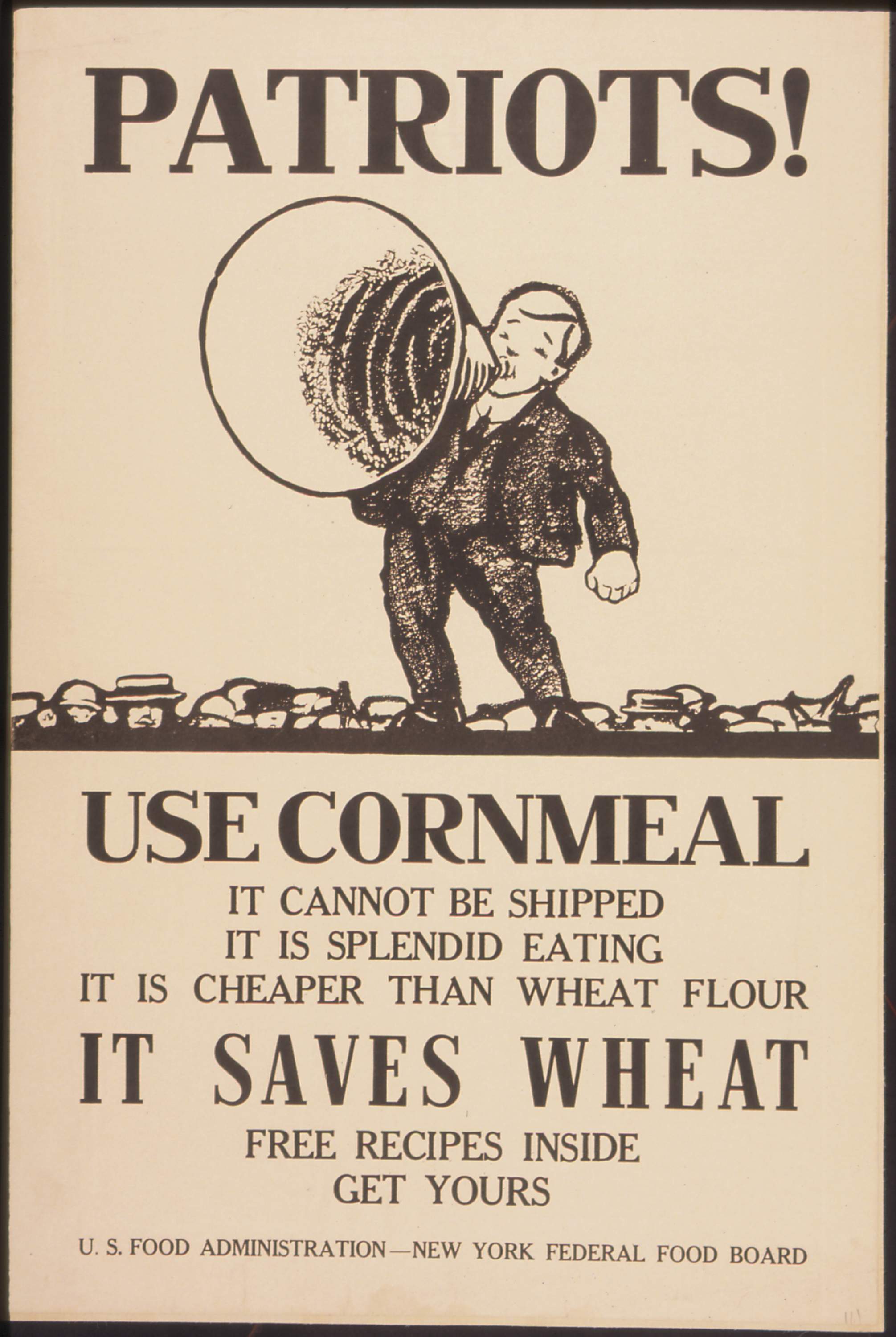
U.S. Food Administration poster during World War I encouraging Americans to use cornmeal, instead of wheat flour: "Patriots Use Corn Meal. It Cannot Be Shipped. It is Splendid Eating. It is Cheaper Than Wheat Flour."

In 1830, it took four people and two oxen, working 10 hours a day, to produce 200 bushels. The geographic center of wheat-growing areas in the U.S. in 1839 was north and west of Washington, D.C., spreading further westward over time. Production conditions also resulted in extending the wheat growing areas into harsher climatic regions. Data on wheat production is available for the period between 1885 and 1930. Improvements in wheat breeding in the U.S. were an activity of the state agricultural experiment stations, while the federal officials concentrated on exploring possibilities of utilizing appropriate varieties developed in other parts of the world. In this way, by the close of the 19th century, such breeding efforts were not longer confined nationally but had evolved into a global endeavour.

After the American Civil War, the availability of large, fertile lands in the western Mississippi Valley and the Great Plains led to the expansion of wheat farming. By this time, better tillage equipment was in use, railroads provided better access to world markets, better trading and warehousing facilities were established, and hard winter wheat was introduced. In the 1870s, Turkey red wheat, a hard variety of wheat, was introduced to the farmlands of Kansas by Russian Mennonite immigrants. This wheat variety spread quickly. New technology substantially enhanced productivity in the 19th century, as sowing with drills replaced broadcasting, cradles took the place of sickles, and the cradles in turn were replaced by reapers and binders. Steam-powered threshing machines superseded flails. By 1895, in Bonanza farms in the Dakotas, it took six different people and 36 horses pulling huge harvesters, working 10 hours a day, to produce 20,000 bushels. Following the invention of the steel roller mill in 1878, hard varieties of wheat such as Turkey Red became more popular than soft varieties, which had been previously preferred because they were easier for grist mills to grind.

=== 20th century – present ===
Exports from 1914 to 1922 amounted to more than 200 million bushels. The annual wheat production of the United States more than tripled in the fifty years between 1871 and 1921; it increased from about 250 million bushels in 1869–1871 to over 750 million in 1919–1921. With recorded wheat production exceeding domestic consumption by up to 2.5 times the consumption when World War II started, surplus wheat stocks could not be exported, resulting in their use as livestock feed and for industrial alcohol. After the war years, there were four "best" years (1945–1948) when the average annual production peaked at 1,228 million bushels, double the production of the war years.

In 2002, 50% of the U.S. wheat crop was exported, while 36% was consumed by the American population, and 10% was fed to livestock, with the remaining 4% set aside for seed. Wheat harvesting covers a land area of 60–63 million acres (around 25 million hectares). Genetically modified wheat, which "is not approved for cultivation anywhere in the world", was found on an Oregon farm in June 2013. The grain was modified by Monsanto to tolerate weed killer treatments. It is not known whether the unapproved wheat is present elsewhere.

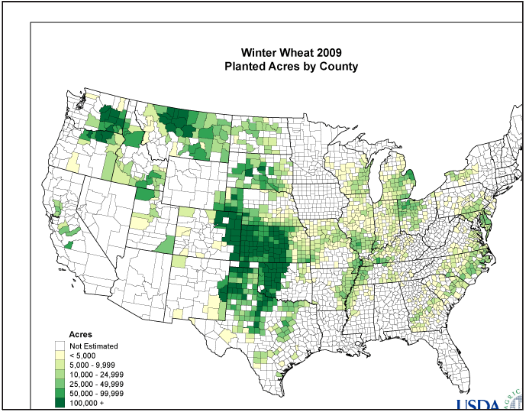
U.S.A. geographic distribution of winter wheat production 2009.

== Geography ==
In the North American plains, the wheat production axis that extends over a length of 1,500 miles (2,400 km) in a north–south direction from central Alberta to central Texas is known as the Wheat Belt. Hard red winter wheat is grown in the Central U.S. states of Kansas, Nebraska, Colorado, Oklahoma, Missouri, Iowa, Illinois, and Texas, as well as parts of the Northwestern United States such as Washington, Oregon and Idaho. In the hot climatic conditions of these states, winter wheat is raised by planting in the fall and harvesting in the spring, taking advantage of autumn rains. Under harsh cold weather conditions in parts of Montana, North Dakota, South Dakota, and Minnesota where winter wheat cannot be grown, the crop is planted in the spring and grows during the long summer days of the high latitudes so that it can be harvested in the fall.

== Classification and uses ==
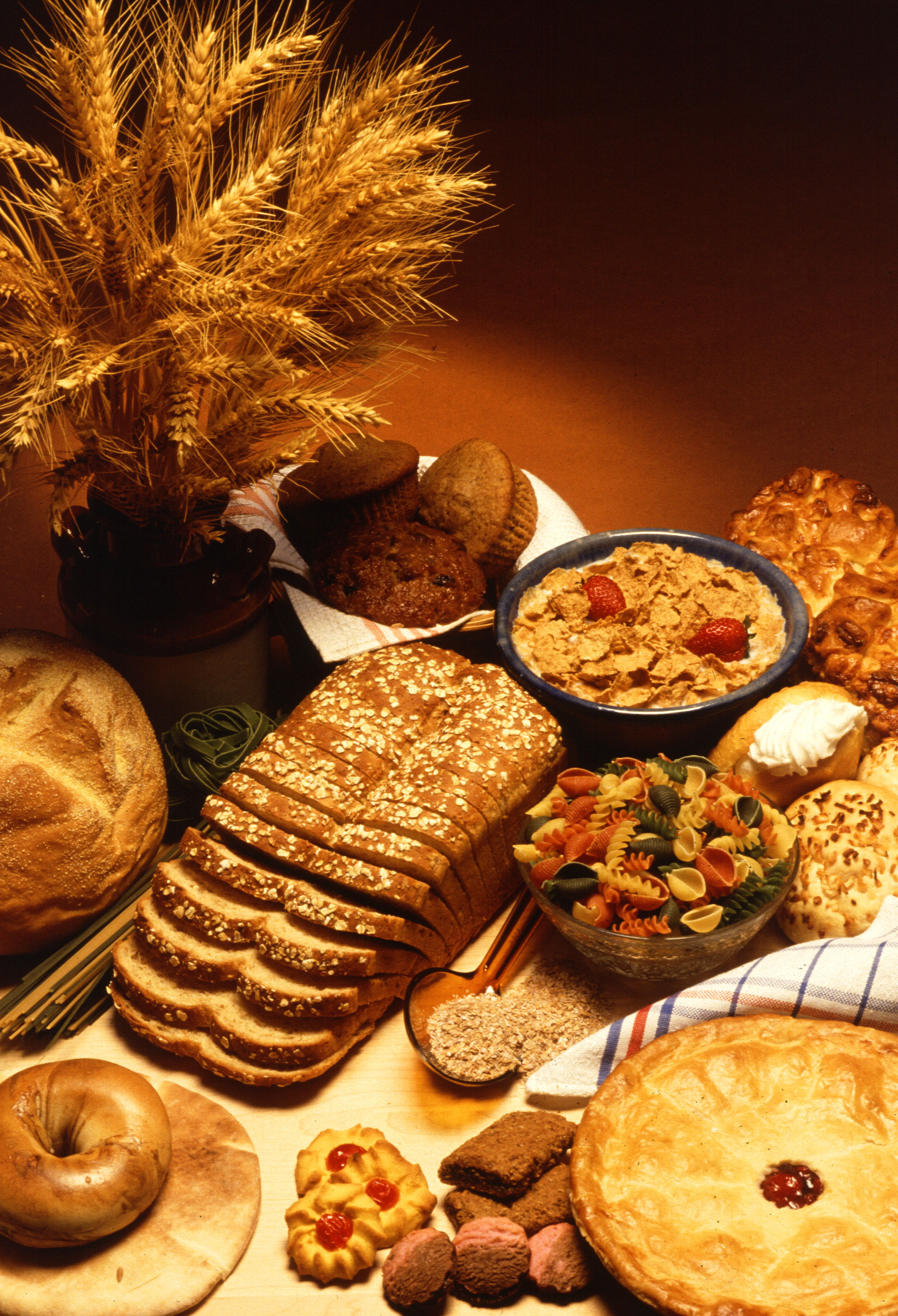
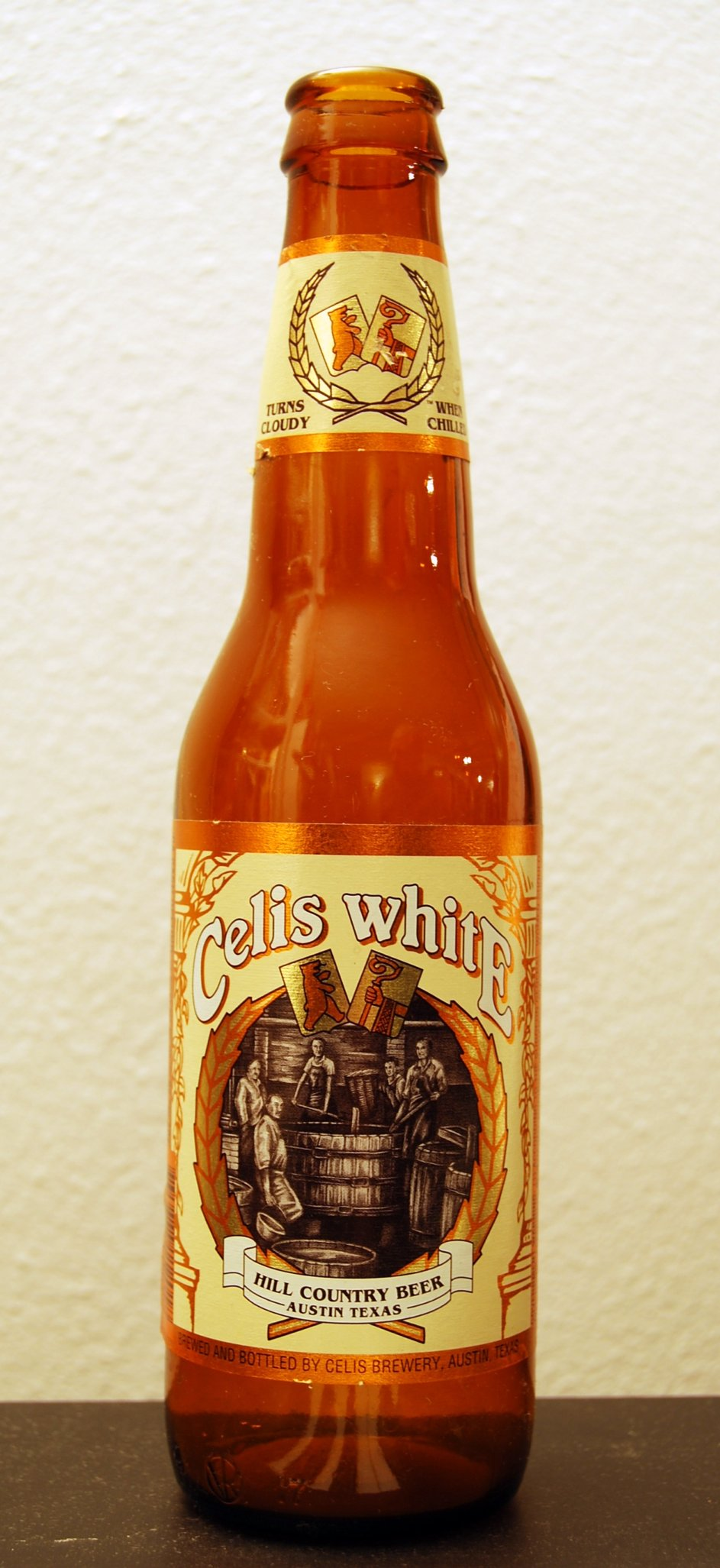
Left: A variety of foods made from wheat. Right: Celis White, a wheat beer brewed in Texas.

Of wheat grown in the United States, 36% is consumed domestically by humans, 50% is exported, 10% is used for livestock feed, and 4% is used for seed. Various American-style wheat beers are produced in the US. Wheat in the U.S. is grown under two major categories based on climate: winter wheat, and spring wheat. The majority is winter wheat, accounting for, on average, 75% of wheat production. Wheat may be further classified as follows:

Type	Average % of production	Where grown	Applications
Hard red winter wheat (HRW)	40%	High Plains, extending from Texas through the largest-producing state, Kansas, and continuing all the way north to the Dakotas and Montana	Used mainly in flour production
Hard red spring wheat (HRS) (includes the sub-classification of Dark Northern Spring Wheat) with high protein value	20%	North Dakota, Montana, Minnesota, and South Dakota	Preferred for making high quality bread
Soft red winter wheat (SRW)	20%	Ohio, Kentucky, Indiana, Washington, Oregon, Idaho, Michigan, New York, and the Southeast	Cakes, cookies, and crackers
White wheat	12.5%	Washington, Oregon, Idaho, Michigan, and New York	Soup noodles, crackers, cereals, and white-crusted breads
Durum wheat	4%	Mostly in Arizona, North Dakota, and Montana	The preferred variety for making pasta

The byproducts resulting from the milling of all the above varieties are used to feed animals.

== Enrichment ==
In 1941, the wheat industry began to adopt voluntary widespread enrichment (fortification) of wheat flour with vitamins, folic acid, and iron, the outcome of a recommendation by the National Nutrition Conference for Defense, charged with investigating the causes of poor health among many World War II recruits. By 1942, some 75 percent of breads in the United States were fortified. Mandatory fortification requirements went into effect in 1943, following the publication of the first U.S. government recommended dietary allowances. The removal of naturally occurring nutrients that occur in grain processing led to a number of diseases caused by nutritional deficiency, including beriberi, pellagra, neural tube defects, and iron-deficiency anemia. Enrichment helped eradicate or reduce the frequency of these conditions in the United States.

== Policy ==
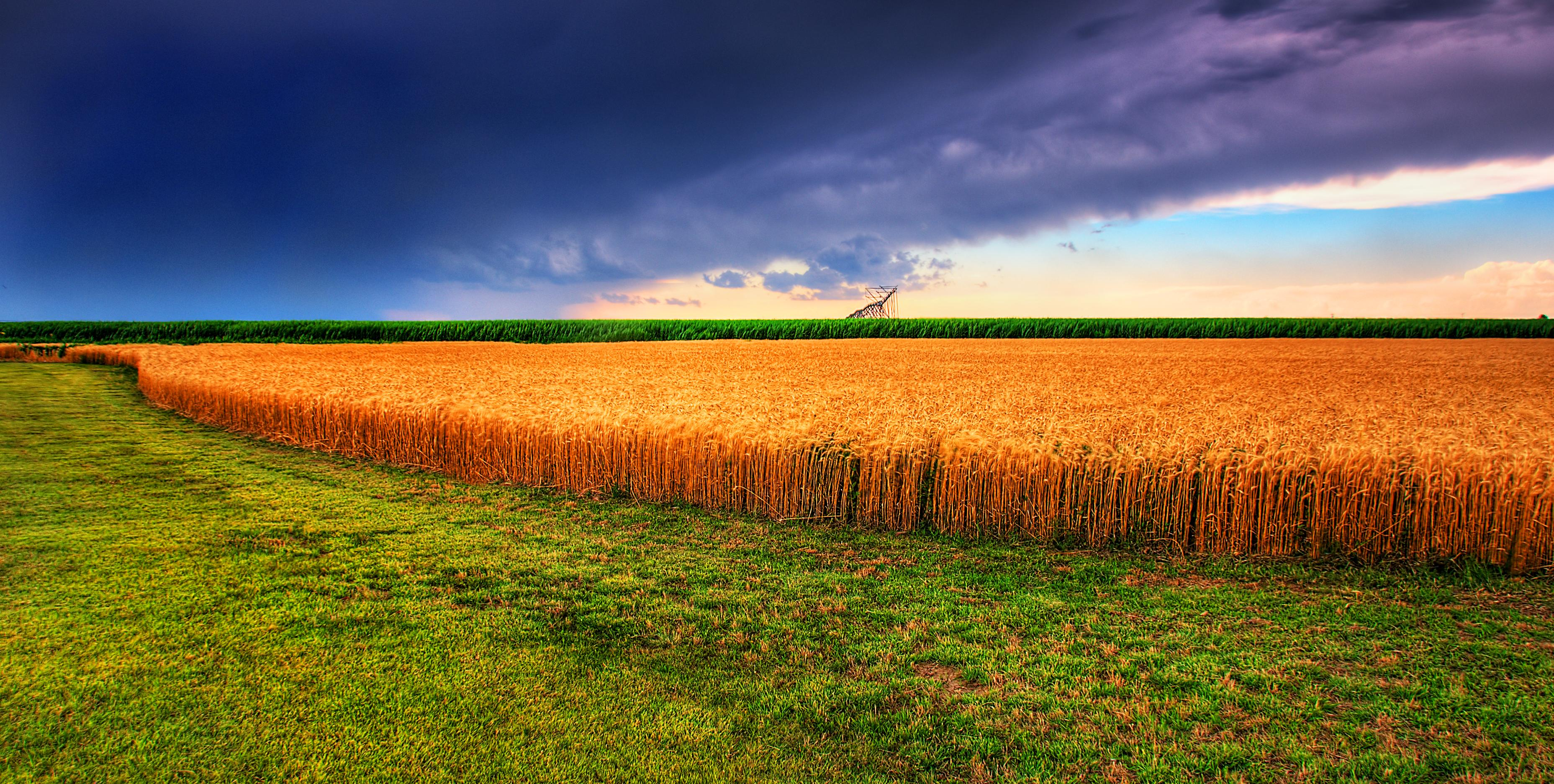
Kansas Summer Wheat and storm panorama

Under the Wilson administration during World War I, the U.S. Food Administration, under the direction of Herbert Hoover, set a basic price of $2.20 per bushel. The end of the war led to "the closing of the bonanza export markets and the fall of sky-high farm prices", and wheat prices fell from more than $2.20 per bushel in 1919 to $1.01 in 1921. The McNary–Haugen Farm Relief Bill failed in Congress and was followed by the Agricultural Marketing Act of 1929, the establishment of the Federal Farm Board, and the Agricultural Adjustment Act of 1933. The most important legislation for wheat production in the United States today are the farm bills, which authorize farm subsidies, the Conservation Reserve Program, and other programs. Adopted around every five years, the most recent farm bills are the 1985 farm bill, 1990 farm bill, 1996 farm bill, 2002 farm bill, 2008 farm bill, 2014 farm bill, and 2018 farm bill.

Wheat farmers are a major beneficiary of crop subsidies and other agricultural programs. According to U.S. Department of Agriculture data, from 1995 to 2012, the U.S. federal government paid over $39 billion in wheat subsidies, through direct payments (2003–present) and production flexibility contracts (1996–2002), deficiency payments, crop insurance premium subsidies, price support payments (including loan deficiency payments, marketing loan gains, and certificates), counter-cyclical programs, market loss assistance, and other wheat programs.

== Production ==
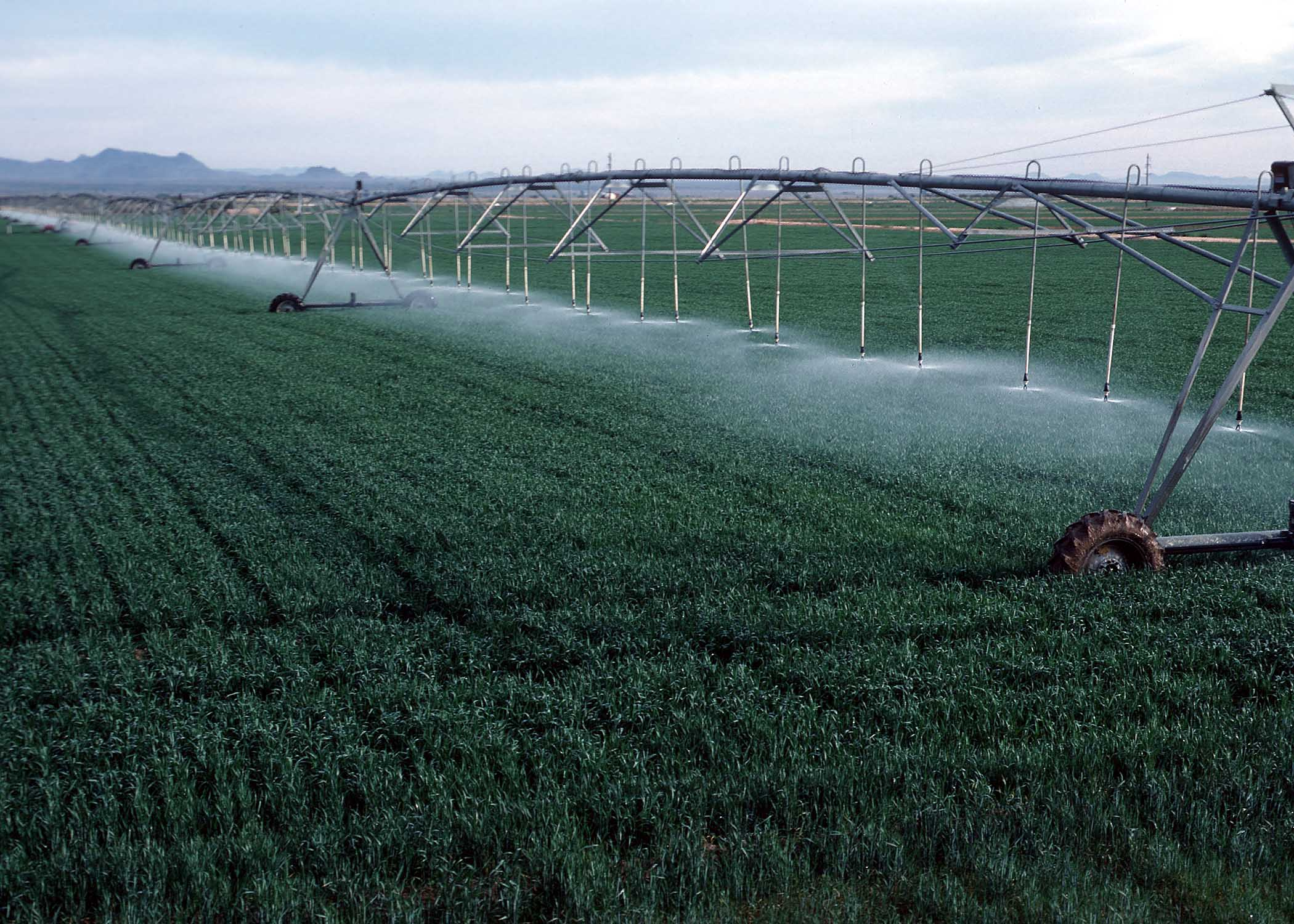
Center pivot irrigation on wheat growing in Yuma County, Colorado

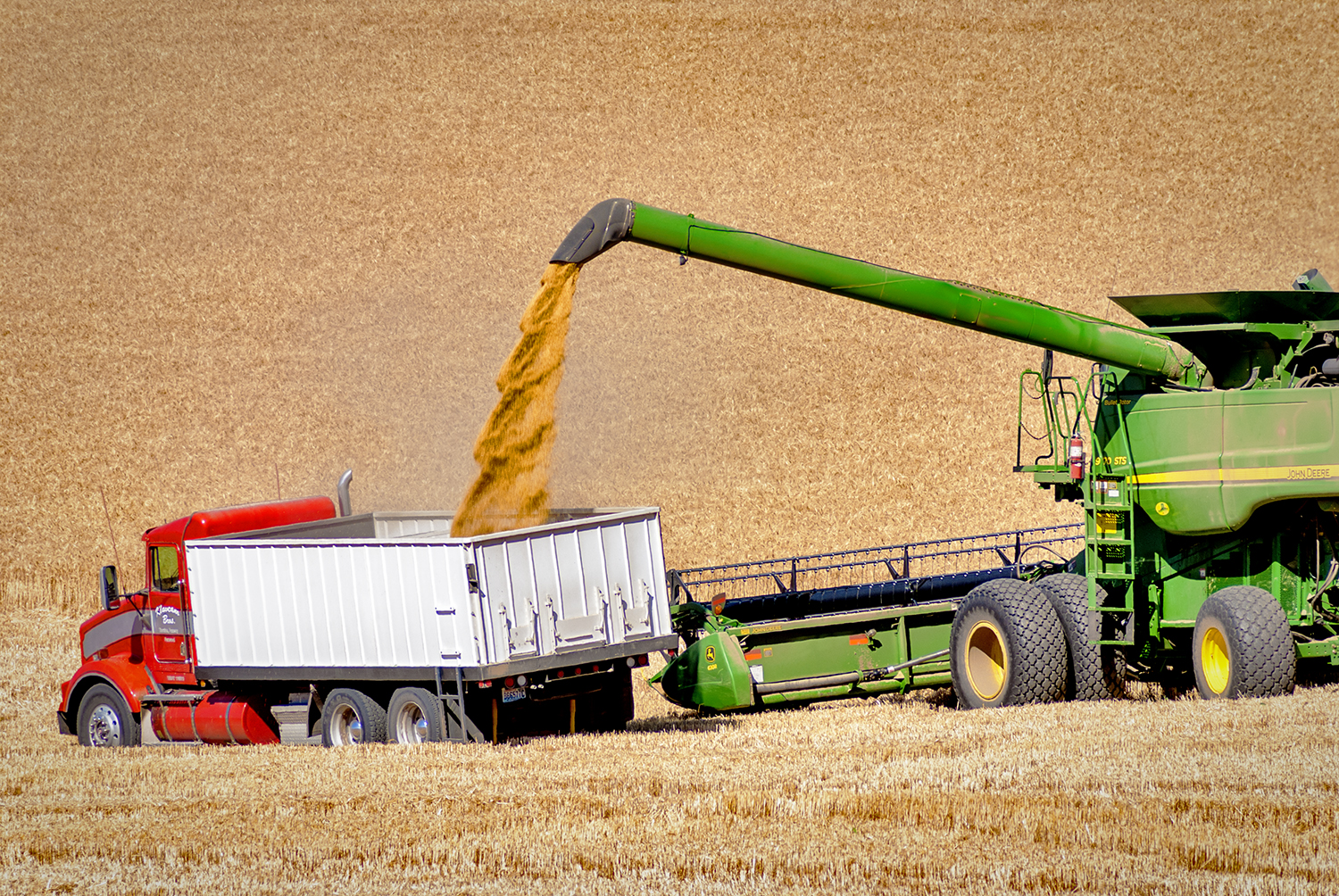
Wheat harvesting near Steptoe, Washington

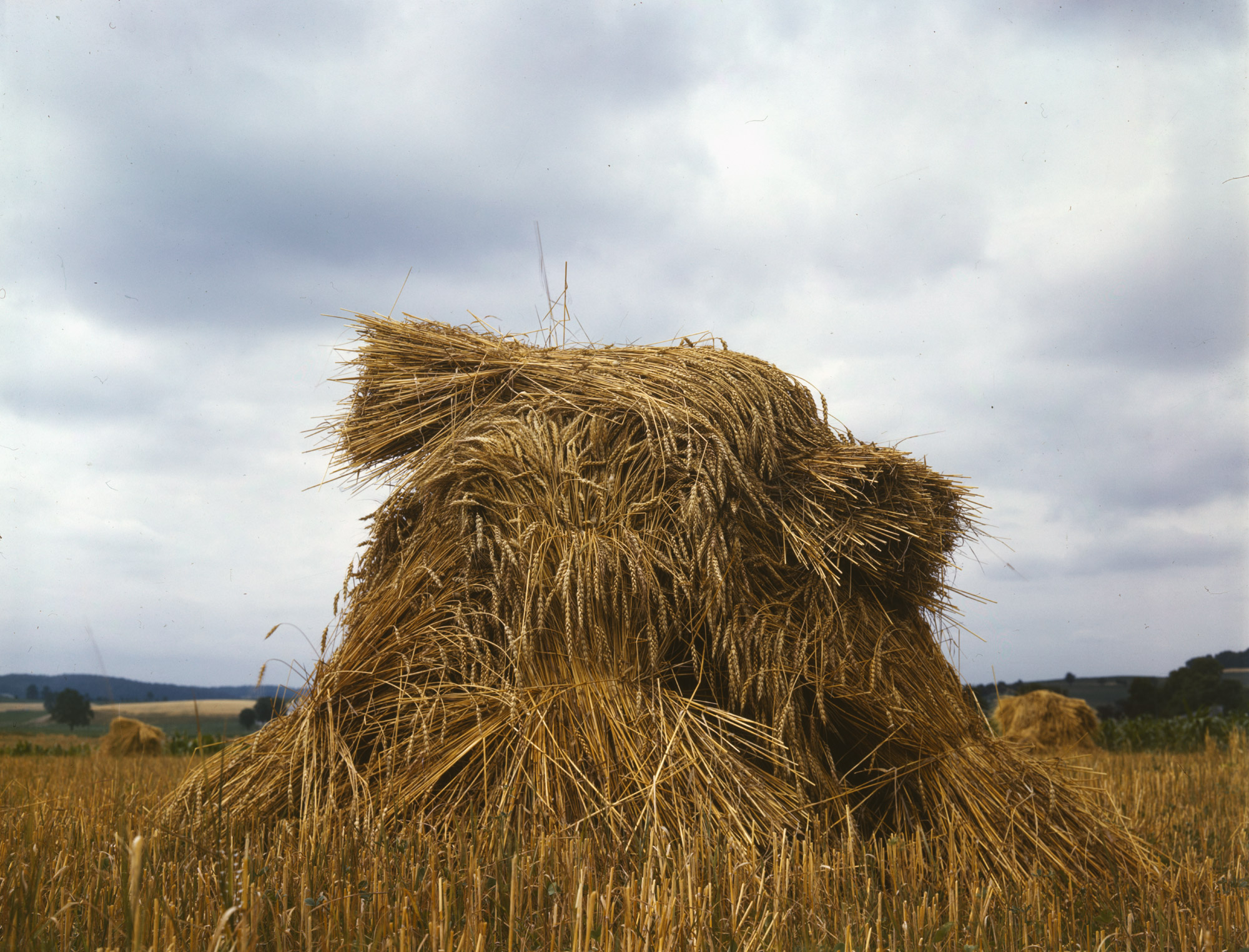
Sheaved and stocked wheat in Pennsylvania (1943)

The United States is a major wheat-producing country, with output typically exceeded only by China, the European Union, and India. Acreage used for wheat cultivation has, over the last several decades, varied with the wheat price. During the first decade of the 2000s, wheat ranked third among U.S. field crops in both planted acreage and gross farm income; the first two positions were held by corn and soybeans. The acreage has gone down by nearly 30% (to 48,653,000 acres in 2001, as against 60-63 million acres harvested annually in the previous years; 30 of this area is in Texas.) The amount exported has also declined. This acreage reduction was dictated by the Acreage Reduction Program (ARP), which was introduced for wheat, feed grains, and cotton, while production faces pressures from multiple factors.

Environmental aspects

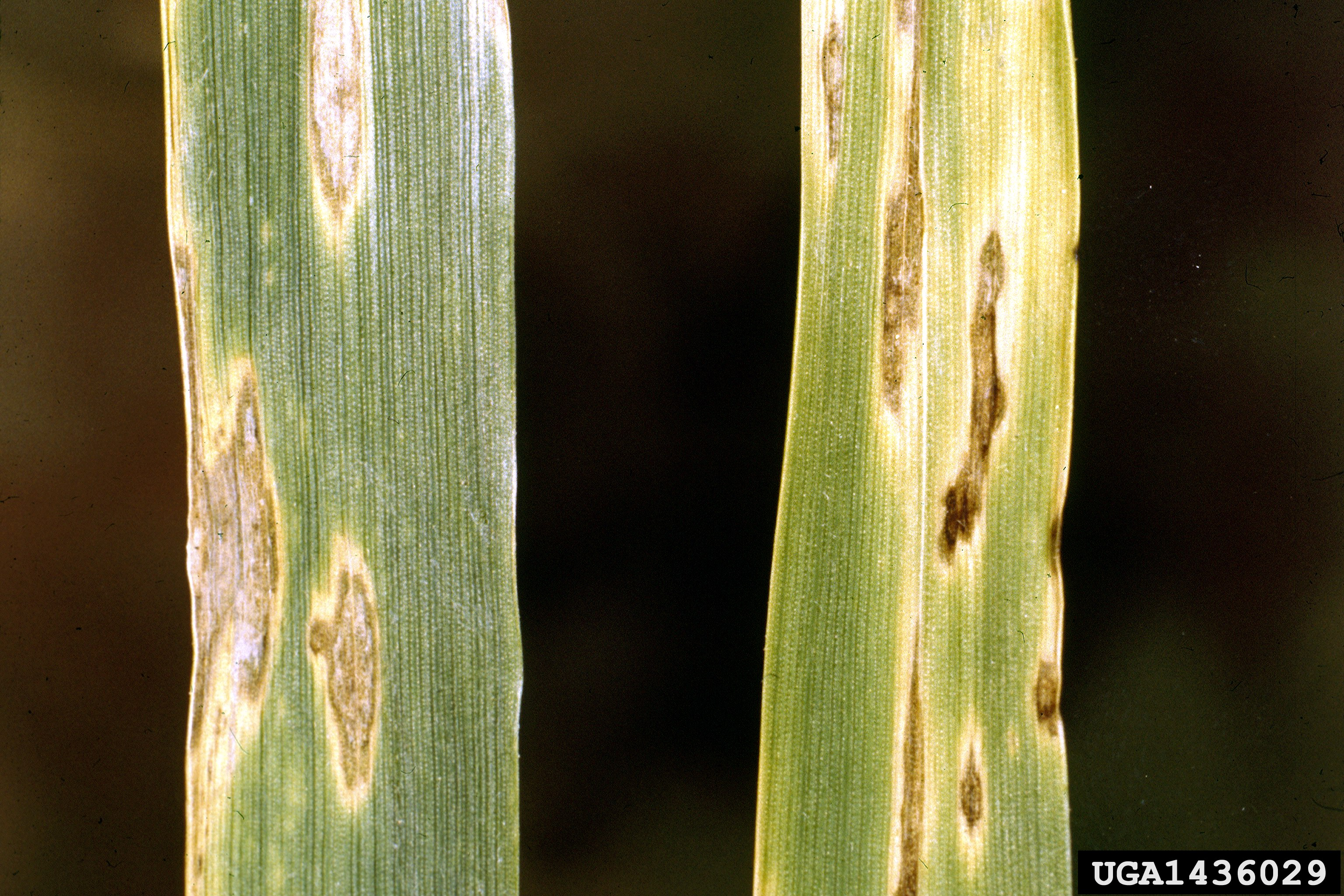
The fungus Septoria tritici can cause wheat diseases.

It is generally accepted that wheat is beneficial to grow in the off-season compared to other crops as, depending on the agro-climatic condition, its planting occurs in late fall or early spring. This results in reduced application of fertilizers and pesticides, and less need for irrigation, and helps in preventing soil erosion. However, some of the negative effects identified in a study conducted by the FAO are natural habitat loss due to encroachment into new lands after degraded lands are abandoned, loss of indigenous species affecting the biodiversity, and milling operations causing dust pollution. Historically, habitat conversion in the US has occurred in agropastoral land areas as in many other countries, and is considered a natural development. In the western US, habitat conversion is still an ongoing process because the subsidies provided by the government for wheat and other crops in the US have made it financially profitable to develop areas which otherwise would lie fallow; bluestem prairie is one such area. However, habitat expansion for wheat has stabilized since 2000.

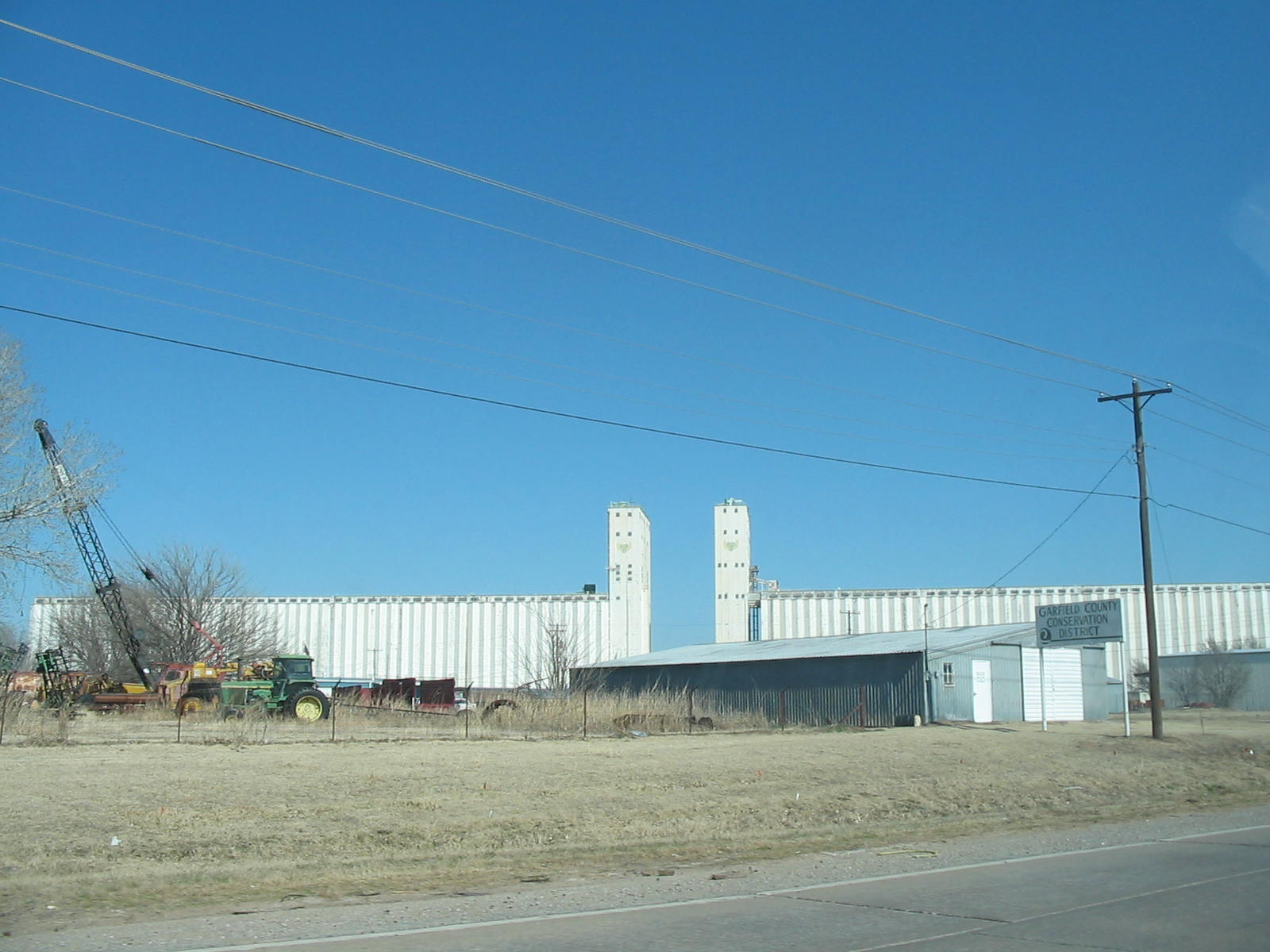
Grain elevator and storage facility in Enid, Oklahoma. "Queen Wheat City" is the nickname given to Enid, Oklahoma. It is also known as the "Wheat Capital" of Oklahoma and the United States for its immense grain storage capacity, and has the third-largest grain storage capacity in the world.

== Exports ==
Nearly 50% of the wheat produced in the US is exported, although the share of the world market has declined due to competition from Argentina, Australia, Canada, European Union (France and Germany), Turkey, United Kingdom and also recently from Ukraine and Russia. The exported wheat varieties are hard red winter, white wheat (about 66%), hard red spring (about 50%), soft red winter, and durum wheat. However, producers continue to increase exports, as wheat products have not been competitive in the domestic market in recent years.

One of the widely criticized export policies of the US was the PL 480 (Public Law 480), instituted in 1954, which lasted until 1969. India had a major share of about 50% in receiving this aid under it. This policy was criticized because it had damaged the export potential of many countries, in particular Australia and Canada. It was also said that this policy discouraged countries from developing their own agriculture. In India, this aid "bankrupted large numbers of Indian farmers".

== See also ==
- Wheat
- Reaper
- International Harvester
