= Market transition payments =

Payments made to US farmers

Market transition payments (referred to variously as AMTA payments, contract payments, or production flexibility contract payments) are made to farmers under Title I (the Agricultural Market Transition Act, or AMTA) of the 1996 farm bill (P.L. 104-127). These payments were replaced by direct payments in the Direct and Counter-cyclical Program (DCP) of the 2002 farm bill (P.L. 101-171, Sec. 1103).

Participants in production flexibility contracts were given production flexibility and diversification options on their contract acres not previously allowed on base acres. Each farm's total payment was the payment rate times the payment quantity for participating base acres. In exchange for market transition payments (annual fixed payments), the owner or operator agreed to comply with the applicable conservation plan for the farm, the wetland protection requirements currently in law, and the constraints on growing fruits and vegetables on contract acres.
