= Contract acreage =

Contract acreage — Base acres enrolled annually in the Direct and Counter-cyclical Program (DCP) authorized by the 2002 farm bill (P.L. 107–171, Sec. 1101–1108) for covered commodities during crop years 2002 through 2007. Previously, the 1996 farm bill (P.L. 104–127) authorized 7-year production flexibility contracts, which guaranteed fixed direct payments but not counter-cyclical target price deficiency payments. The new law uses the term agreement rather than contract, but farmers must sign a Direct and Counter-cyclical Program Contract (Form CCC-509).
