= Omnibus Consolidated and Emergency Supplemental Appropriations Act, 1999 =

The United States Omnibus Consolidated and Emergency Appropriations Act, FY1999 Pub. L. 105–277 (text) (PDF), among its numerous provisions that include the regular annual appropriations for most United States Department of Agriculture (USDA) programs, provided $5.9 billion in emergency spending for USDA programs to shore up farm income and to compensate farmers for natural disasters. More than one-half of this amount ($3.1 billion) was in the form of direct market loss payments to grain, cotton, and dairy farmers for income assistance. Most of the balance was for disaster payments made to farmers who experienced large crop losses in either 1998 or in 3 of the 5 years between 1994 through 1998.

== See also ==
- Apple Market Loss Assistance Program
- Dairy Market Loss Assistance
- McDade Amendment
