= Fides =

Fides or FIDES (latin "faith") may refer to:

== Main ==
- Faith, trust, loyalty, or fidelity, or a religious belief

== Name ==
- Fides (name), given name
- Fides (deity), goddess of trust in Roman mythology
- Saint Fides (Saint Faith), christian martyrs:
  - Saints Faith, Hope and Charity and their mother Sophie (Wisdom) (d. 137)
  - Saint Faith of Agen (d. 287 or 290)

== Titles ==
- Fides (reliability), guide allowing estimated reliability calculation in electronics
- Fides (cycling team), an Italian professional cycling team in 1961
- 37 Fides, asteroid in the main belt of Earth's Solar System
- Uberrima fides, legal doctrine governing insurance contracts
- Agenzia Fides, news agency of the Vatican
- FIDES Bank Namibia, a commercial bank
- Fonds d'Investissements pour le Developpement Economique et Social, former government agency of colonial-era France

== See also ==
- Bona fide (disambiguation)
- Fide (disambiguation)
