= Acreage Reduction Program =

In the United States, the Acreage Reduction Program (ARP) is a no-longer-authorized annual cropland retirement program for wheat, feed grains, cotton, or rice in which farmers participating in the commodity programs (in order to be eligible for nonrecourse loans and deficiency payments) were mandated to idle a crop-specific, nationally set portion of their base acreage during years of surplus. The idled acreage (called the acreage conservation reserve) was devoted to a conserving use. The goal was to reduce supplies, thereby raising market prices. Additionally, idled acres did not earn deficiency payments, thus reducing commodity program costs. ARP was criticized for diminishing the U.S. competitive position in export markets. The 1996 farm bill (P.L. 104–127) did not reauthorize ARPs. ARP differed from a set-aside program in that under a set-aside program reductions were based upon current year plantings, and did not require farmers to reduce their plantings of a specific crop.

== See also ==
- Environmental Conservation Acreage Reserve Program
