= Paid diversion =

In United States agricultural policy Paid diversion was a program, repealed by the 1996 farm bill (P.L. 104–127), under which farmers were paid to voluntarily take acreage out of production. The diverted land was devoted to approved conservation practices. Unlike acreage reduction and set-aside programs, participation in a paid diversion program was not normally a condition of eligibility for other support program benefits.

While the Conservation Reserve Program pays farmers to take land out of production, the objective is to achieve certain environmental objectives.
