= Good faith (disambiguation) =

Good faith is a sincere intention to be fair, open and honest.

Good faith may also refer to:

- Good faith (law), implied covenant of honesty and fair dealing in contract law
- Good Faith (Rik Emmett album) (2003), eighth studio album by Canadian guitarist Rik Emmett
- Good Faith (Madeon album), a 2019 album by French DJ and producer Madeon

== See also ==
- Bona fide (disambiguation)
- Good Faith Collaboration
- Good faith estimate
- Good-faith exception
- Good-faith provisions
