= Triple base plan =

In United States agricultural policy, the triple base plan, also called the flexible base plan, is a proposal under which farmers who raise program crops would receive program payments only on a certain percentage of their permitted acreage. A producer participating in a federal price support program actually would have three categories of base acres for program purposes:

1. permitted acres on which deficiency payments would be made
2. permitted acres on which no federal payments would be made, but could be planted to other crops, either specified or unspecified
3. idled acres (those required to be set aside under acreage reduction rules) where no crops other than those for conservation could be planted

Triple base is another name for what came to be known as normal flex acres. Production flexibility contracts under the 1996 farm bill (P.L. 104-127) and the Direct and Counter-cyclical Program (DCP) agreements under the 2002 farm bill (P.L. 101-171, Sec. 1101-1108) eliminated the linkage between direct payments and actual plantings.
