= Historic peanut producers =

In United States agricultural policy, Historic peanut producers are those producers who were actively involved in planting and harvesting peanuts in the 1998-2001 period. Under the 2002 farm bill (P.L. 107-171, Sec. 1301-1310), only these historic producers are eligible to receive fixed direct payments and counter-cyclical payments under the new peanut program, irrespective of whether or not they continue to produce peanuts. Payments made to these producers are based on past production on historical acreage.
