= Triple-base =

Triple-base may refer to:

- Triple base plan, a United States agricultural policy proposal
- Triple-base propellant, a flashless cordite
