= Stephen Gillers =

American legal ethicist

Stephen Gillers (born 1943) is a professor emeritus at the New York University School of Law. He is often cited as an expert in legal ethics.

== Biography ==
Stephen M. Gillers was born in 1943. After graduating from Brooklyn College with a B.A. in 1964, he received his J.D. in 1968 from the New York University School of Law.

Gillers annually co-authors Regulation of Lawyers: Statutes and Standards (with Professor Roy Simon of Hofstra).

Gillers' political activism includes calling on then-presidential candidate John Kerry in 2004 to name former U.S. President Bill Clinton as his running mate in a New York Times op-ed.

Gillers has also been critical of U.S. Supreme Court Justices accepting paid trips to legal seminars.

In 2024, after a "Stop The Steal" flag was hoisted at Supreme Court Justice Samuel A. Alito Jr's home, Gillers said he found it "impossible to believe" that Alito, who blamed the flag on his wife, knew about the flag. Gillers said, no "objective observer would question Alito’s impartiality based on this incident."
