= Prevented planting acreage =

Prevented planting, under crop insurance, refers to acreage that cannot be planted because of flood, drought, or other natural disaster and so is eligible for indemnification. Also, prevented planting acreage may be excluded from the time frame used for calculating support program base acres.
