= McDade Amendment =

United States federal law concerning prosecutorial ethics

Ethical Standards for Government Attorneys
- Nicknames: McDade Amendment; McDade–Murtha Amendment; Citizens Protection Act
- Enacted by: the 105th United States Congress
- Effective: April 19, 1999

Citations
- Public law: Pub. L. 105–277 (text) (PDF)
- Statutes at Large: 112 Stat. 2681–118

Codification
- U.S.C. sections created: 28 U.S.C. § 530B
- Agencies affected: Department of Justice

The McDade Amendment (also known as the McDade–Murtha Amendment and the Citizens Protection Act) is a United States federal law. The law is codified at 28 U.S.C. § 530B under the title "Ethical Standards for Government Attorneys". It requires federal prosecutors to follow state legal ethics rules. The law was introduced by Joseph McDade, a Republican congressman from Pennsylvania, who had been prosecuted by the United States Department of Justice for public corruption and acquitted. It also followed over a decade of controversy over the DOJ's attempts to exempt federal prosecutors from state ethics rules, particularly the no-contact rule, which prohibits an attorney from communicating with a person who is represented by another lawyer. Legal commentators have divided on the wisdom and efficacy of the law.

== Description and implementation ==
McDade Amendment

An attorney for the Government shall be subject to State laws and rules, and local Federal court rules, governing attorneys in each State where such attorney engages in that attorney’s duties, to the same extent and in the same manner as other attorneys in that State.

— 28 U.S.C. § 530B (a)

In the United States, attorneys are subject to self-regulation by state bars and the judiciary. The McDade Amendment subjects federal prosecutors within the United States Department of Justice (DOJ) to the rules of any states where they practice. Federal courts interpreting the statute have held that it requires federal prosecutors to follow generally applicable ethics rules and that it does not override other federal law. DOJ regulations implementing the rule (28 CFR 77) subject federal prosecutors to the rule of the state where they are licensed when a case is not in court. In March 2026, Attorney General Pam Bondi introduced a regulation that would require state disciplinary authorities to defer to the DOJ's Office of Professional Responsibility when seeking to discipline federal prosecutors. The legal scholars Bruce Green and Rebecca Roiphe wrote that the proposed regulation would be in conflict with the McDade Amendment.

== Background ==
Federal prosecutors were generally not held responsible under state legal ethics rules through the 1970s. At that point, white-collar criminal defense attorneys began seeking sanctions for violations of the no-contact rule, a rule of attorney ethics that prohibits any attorney or their agent from speaking with a represented party without the presence or permission of counsel. In 1988, the United States Court of Appeals for the Second Circuit decided United States v. Hammad, holding that the no-contact rule applies to prosecutors' use of informants to obtain information from suspects at any point in an investigation, including prior to obtaining an indictment.

In response to Hammad, the United States Attorney General Dick Thornburgh issued what came to be known as the Thornburgh Memorandum in 1989. The memorandum argued that the DOJ's investigative practices were necessary and that Supremacy Clause of the United States Constitution prohibits the application of state ethics rules to federal prosecutors. The memorandum was controversial and widely criticized by the organized bar and judges. Despite the criticism, in 1995 Attorney General Janet Reno issued the Reno Regulation, which codified the Thornburgh Memorandum. The Reno Regulation was declared unlawful by the United States Court of Appeals for the Eighth Circuit in the 1998 case United States v. McDonnell Douglas.

During the debates over Hammad and the Thornburgh Memorandum, the DOJ began investigating Joseph McDade, a Republican congressman from Pennsylvania, for corruption. McDade criticized his prosecution as overzealous and unjust. He was acquitted in 1996.

== Enactment ==
After being acquitted in 1966, McDade introduced legislation to repeal the Reno Regulation. McDade believed that federal prosecutors regularly violated ethics rules and that the Reno Regulation was an attempt to prevent scrutiny. The bill did not pass the 104th Congress. It was reintroduced in 1997 in the next Congress, along with broader legislation that would have created an enforcement mechanism known as the Citizens Protection Act. The bill was eventually passed as a rider to the Omnibus Consolidated and Emergency Supplemental Appropriations Act, 1999 in October 1998, over the objection of Senator Orrin Hatch, who protested the bypassing of his committee. The law was codified as section 530B of Title 28 of the United States Code.

== Analysis ==
Legal commentators have debated the wisdom and efficacy of the McDade Amendment. The legal scholar John G. Douglass said that the McDade Amendment gives white-collar and corporate defendants more protections than ordinary criminal defendants under the no-contact rule. By contrast, the legal scholar Rima Sirota said that, even after the McDade Amendment, federal courts have continued to interpret the no-contact rule to allow federal prosecutors to communicate with represented parties prior to the filing of criminal charges. The legal scholars Bruce Green and Fred Zacharias wrote that the law prevents federal courts from regulating federal prosecutors and that some state ethics rules should not apply in federal court.

== See also ==
- Massiah v. United States
- Office of Professional Responsibility

== Sources ==
- Douglass, John G. (2002). "Jimmy Hoffa's Revenge: White-Collar Rights Under the McDade Amendment". Articles. William & Mary Bill of Rights Journal. 11 (1) (symposium ed.): 123–150. Archived from the original on December 13, 2025.
- Gillers, Stephen (2022). "Because They Are Lawyers First and Foremost: Ethics Rules and Other Strategies to Protect the Justice Department from a Faithless President" (PDF). Articles. Georgia Law Review. 57 (1): 163–232. Archived (PDF) from the original on January 24, 2025.
- Green, Bruce; Roiphe, Rebecca (April 14, 2026). "The Justice Department's Bid to Avoid Accountability". Lawfare. Archived from the original on July 20, 2026.
- Green, Bruce A.; Zacharias, Fred C. (2002). "Regulating Federal Prosecutors' Ethics". Articles. Vanderbilt Law Review. 55 (2): 381–478. Archived from the original on July 29, 2024.
- "Federal Prosecutors, State Ethics Regulations, and the McDade Amendment". Notes. Harvard Law Review. 113 (8): 2080–2097. 2000 – via HeinOnline.
- Holderman, James F.; Redfern, Charles B. (2006). "Preindictment Prosecutorial Conduct in the Federal System Revisited". Journal of Criminal Law & Criminology. 96 (2): 527–578. Archived from the original on May 11, 2026.
- Oliver, Lawrence II (2021). "Double Standard: How DOJ Flouts the No-Contact Rules of Professional Responsibility". Symposia. Villanova Law Review. 66 (5): 947–961. Archived from the original on February 6, 2026.
- Marino, Nina; Kaplan, Richard (1999). "McDade Amendment: Moving Towards a Meaningful Limitation on Wrongful Prosecutorial Contact with Represented Parties". Articles. Richmond Public Interest Law Review. 4 (1): 36–51. Archived from the original on May 21, 2026.
- Sirota, Rima (2013). "Reassessing the Citizens Protection Act: A Good Thing It Passed, and a Good Thing It Failed". Articles. Southwestern Law Review. 43 (1): 51–95. Archived from the original on July 14, 2025 – via Georgetown University Law Center Scholarly Commons.
- Zacharias, Fred; Green, Bruce (1999). "The Uniqueness of Federal Prosecutors". Articles. Georgetown Law Journal. 88 (2): 207–261. Archived from the original on July 8, 2024 – via Fordham Law Archive of Scholarship & History.
