= Amta (disambiguation) =

Amta is a census town in West Bengal, India.

Amta or AMTA may also refer to:

== Places ==
- Amta I, a community development block in West Bengal, India
- Amta II, a community development block in West Bengal, India
- Amta Assembly constituency, Howra district, West Bengal

== Newspapers ==
- Akershus Amtstidende, a Norwegian local newspaper
- Amta, now Smaalenenes Amtstidende, a Norwegian newspaper

== Organisations ==
- American Manufacturers of Toilet Articles, former name of the lobbying group Personal Care Products Council, United States
- Australian Music Trades Association, predecessor of the Australian Music Association

== Other uses ==
- Agricultural Market Transition Act, 1966 U.S. legislation
