= Comprehensive Conservation Enhancement Program =

Comprehensive Conservation Enhancement Program (CCHP): — The 2002 farm bill (P.L. 107-171, Sec. 2006) created CCHP, the new name for the Environmental Conservation Acreage Reserve Program (ECARP). Like ECARP, the CCHP is not a program, but an umbrella authority that encompasses the Conservation Reserve Program, Wetland Reserve Program, and Environmental Quality Incentives Program. Good faith provisions (P.L. 107-171, Sec. 1613), first established by the Agriculture Appropriations Act for FY2001 (P.L. 106-387, Sec. 755), apply to conservation programs as well.
