= Massiah v. United States =

- Supreme Court of the United States

Argued March 3, 1964 Decided May 18, 1964
- Full case name: Winston Massiah v. United States
- Citations: 377 U.S. 201 (more) 84 S. Ct. 1199; 12 L. Ed. 2d 246; 1964 U.S. LEXIS 1277

Case history
- Prior: 307 F.2d 62 (2d Cir. 1962), reversed

Holding
- Once criminal proceedings have begun, the government cannot bypass the defendant's lawyer and try to elicit statements from the defendant.

Court membership
- Chief Justice Earl Warren Associate Justices Hugo Black · William O. Douglas; Tom C. Clark · John M. Harlan II; William J. Brennan Jr. · Potter Stewart; Byron White · Arthur Goldberg

Case opinions
- Majority: Stewart, joined by Warren, Black, Douglas, Brennan, Goldberg
- Dissent: White, joined by Clark, Harlan

Laws applied
- U.S. Const. amend. VI

Massiah v. United States, 377 U.S. 201 (1964), was a case in which the Supreme Court of the United States held that the Sixth Amendment to the United States Constitution does not allow the government to elicit statements from a person, without their attorney present, after their Sixth Amendment right to counsel is enlivened.

== Case ==
=== Facts ===
In Massiah, the defendant had been indicted on a federal narcotics charge. He retained a lawyer, pleaded not guilty, and was released on bail. A co-defendant, after deciding to cooperate with the government, invited Massiah to sit in his car and discuss the crime he was indicted on, during which the government listened in via a radio transmitter. During the conversation, Massiah made several incriminating statements, and those statements were introduced at trial to be used against him.

=== Decision ===
Massiah appealed his conviction, which was affirmed in part by the Court of Appeals for the Second Circuit. The Supreme Court granted certiorari and reversed, holding that the statements made by the defendant outside the presence of his attorney must be suppressed.

=== Massiah rule ===
The Massiah rule applies to the use of testimonial evidence in criminal proceedings deliberately elicited by the police from a defendant after formal charges have been filed. The events that trigger the Sixth Amendment safeguards under Massiah are (1) the commencement of adversarial criminal proceedings and (2) deliberate elicitation of information from the defendant by governmental agents.

The Sixth Amendment guarantees a defendant a right to counsel in all criminal prosecutions. The purposes of the Sixth Amendment right to counsel are to protect a defendant's right to a fair trial and to assure that our adversarial system of justice functions properly by providing competent counsel as an advocate for the defendant in his contest against the “prosecutorial forces” of the state.

The Sixth Amendment right “attaches” once the government has committed itself to the prosecution of the case by the initiation of adversarial judicial proceedings "by way of formal charge, preliminary hearing, indictment, information or arraignment,". Determining whether a particular event or proceeding constitutes the commencement of adversarial criminal proceedings requires both an examination of the rules of criminal procedure for the jurisdiction in which the crime is charged and the Supreme Court cases dealing with the issue of when formal prosecution begins. Once adversarial criminal proceedings commence the right to counsel applies to all critical stages of the prosecution and investigation. A critical stage is "any stage of the prosecution, formal or informal, in court or out, where counsel's absence might derogate from the accused's right to a fair trial."

Government attempts to obtain incriminating statement related to the offense charged from the defendant by overt interrogation or surreptitious means is a critical stage and any information thus obtained is subject to suppression unless the government can show that an attorney was present or the defendant knowingly, voluntarily and intelligently waived his right to counsel.

Deliberate elicitation is defined as the intentional creation of circumstances by government agents that are likely to produce incriminating information from the defendant. Clearly express questioning (interrogation) would qualify but the concept also extends to surreptitious attempts to acquire information from the defendant through the use of undercover agents or paid informants.

=== Massiah rule versus Miranda rule ===
The definition of "deliberate elicitation" is not the same as the definition of "interrogation" under the Miranda rule established in Miranda v. Arizona. Miranda interrogation includes express questioning and any actions or statements that an officer would reasonably foresee as likely to cause an incriminating response. Massiah applies to express questioning and any attempt to deliberately and intentionally obtain incriminating information from the defendant regarding the crime charged. The difference is purposeful creation of an environment likely to produce incriminating information (Massiah) and action likely to induce an incriminating response even if that was not the officer's purpose or intent (Miranda).

The Sixth Amendment right to counsel is offense specific—the right only applies to post commencement attempts to obtain information relating to the crime charged. The right does not extend to uncharged offenses even those that are factually related to the charged crime.

=== Waiver ===
As noted, information obtained in violation of the defendant's Sixth Amendment right to counsel is subject to suppression unless the government can establish that the defendant waived his right to counsel. The waiver must be knowing, intelligent and voluntary. A valid Miranda waiver operates as a waiver of Sixth Amendment right.

== Massiah vs. Miranda ==
1. Constitutional Basis - Miranda is based on the Fifth Amendment right against self-incrimination. Massiah is based on the Sixth Amendment right to counsel.
2. Attachment - Miranda: Custody + Interrogation. (Charging status irrelevant) Massiah: Formally Charged + Deliberate Elicitation. (Custodial status irrelevant)
3. Scope
  1. Miranda applies to custodial interrogation by known governmental agents. Surreptitious acquisition of incriminating information allowed. Massiah applies to overt and surreptitious interrogation.
  2. Miranda is not offense specific. Massiah is offense specific.
  3. Miranda: interrogation + "functional equivalent." Massiah: interrogation + "deliberate elicitation."
4. Waiver: Both Miranda and Massiah rights may be waived.
5. Assertion: In each case, the assertion must be clear and unequivocal. The effects of assertion are not identical. For purposes of Miranda, the police must immediately cease the interrogation and cannot resume interrogating the defendant about any offense charged or uncharged unless counsel is present or defendant initiates contact for purposes of resuming interrogation and valid waiver obtained. Because Massiah is offense-specific, an assertion of the sixth amendment right to counsel requires the police to cease interrogating the defendant about any charged offense. Apparently the police could continue questioning the defendant about uncharged crimes assuming that the defendant was not in custody. The defendant's remedy would be to leave or to refuse to answer questions.
6. Remedy for violation: The statements and testimonial information are subject to suppression. Derivative evidence is usually not subject to suppression under Miranda pursuant to the "fruit of poisonous tree" doctrine, although it might be suppressed for a Massiah violation. Both Miranda and Massiah defective statements can be used for impeachment purposes.
7. Exceptions: The primary exceptions to Miranda are (1) the routine booking questions exception (2) the jail house informant exception and (3) the public safety exception. In Moulton v. Maine the Supreme Court refused to recognize a public safety exception to the Massiah rule. Massiah allows for the use of jail house informants provided the informants serve merely as "passive listeners."

== Massiah and the voluntariness standard ==
The Massiah rule is also to be contrasted with the voluntariness standard of the Fifth and Fourteenth Amendments. The voluntariness standard applies to all police interrogations regardless of the custodial status of the suspect and regardless of whether the suspect has been formally charged. The remedy for a violation of the standard is complete suppression of the statement and any evidence derived from the statement. The statement cannot be used as either substantive evidence of guilt or to impeach the defendant's testimony. The reason for the strictness is the common law's aversion to the use of coerced confessions because of their inherent unreliability. Further the rights to be free from coerced confession cannot be waived nor is it necessary that the victim of coercive police conduct assert his right. In considering the voluntariness standard one must consider the Supreme Court's decision in Colorado v. Connelly. Although federal courts' application of the Connelly rule has been inconsistent and state courts have often failed to appreciate the consequences of the case, Connelly clearly marked a significant change in the application of the voluntariness standard. Before Connelly the test was whether the confession was voluntary considering the totality of the circumstances. "Voluntary" carried its everyday meaning - the confession had to be a product of the exercise of the defendant's free will rather than police coercion. After Connelly the totality of circumstances test is not even triggered unless the defendant can show coercive police conduct. Questions of free will and rational decision making are irrelevant to a due process claim unless police misconduct existed and a causal connection can be shown between the misconduct and the confession.

== See also ==
- McDade Amendment
- Miranda warning
- Miranda v. Arizona
- List of United States Supreme Court cases, volume 377
