= Dairy Market Loss Assistance =

USDA dairy subsidies

Dairy Market Loss Assistance (DMLA) was a series of programs of the United States Department of Agriculture to make emergency direct-payment programs for dairy farmers, in response to volatile farm milk prices. It was funded over three consecutive years (FY1999-2001) by three separate emergency supplemental appropriations measures. The primary purpose of these payments was to supplement dairy farmer income. Dairy farmers received supplemental payments of $200 million provided by the Omnibus Consolidated and Emergency Appropriations Act, 1999 (P.L. 105-277) in DMLA-I; $125 million from the FY2000 agriculture appropriations act (P.L. 106-78) in DMLA-II; and $675 million in emergency provisions in the FY2001 agriculture appropriations act (P.L. 106-387) in DMLA-III.

== See also ==
- Market loss assistance
