= Zealous advocacy =

Legal doctrine

Zealous advocacy, also called zealous representation (or resolute advocacy in Commonwealth countries), is a legal doctrine and legal ethical obligation within adversarial systems under which an lawyer vigorously and loyally represent their clients' interests. In jurisdictions with this doctrine, the attorney is expected to use all lawful means to advance the client's cause, prioritizing their interests above all others, and attempting resolving any legal questions in their client's favor. Although most prominent in litigation, zealous advocacy also applies to out-of-court legal advice, settlement, and negotiation between opposing parties.

In countries without an adversarial system, either because they employ an inquisitorial system or because the rule of law is weak or absent, the principle of zealous advocacy generally may occupy a less central role.In such systems, the attorney is may be expected to function less as a fully partisan advocate and more as a legal officer of the court whose primary duty is to assist in the correct application of the law rather than to secure the most favorable outcome for the client.

Failure by an attorney to engage in zealous advocacy ("underzealousness" or "under-advocacy") may result in a less satisfactory outcome of a trial or dispute for a client or incurr professional consequences for the attorney by the bar association (including in extreme cases probation, law license suspension or even disbarment) and open up the possibility of civil liability towards their own (former) client via legal malpractice. In criminal proceedings, particularly in the United States, sufficiently serious failures of zealous advocacy may also constitute ineffective assistance of counsel, potentially resulting in the reversal of a conviction or the ordering of a retrial. Nevertheless, the attorney's loyalty towards their client is not infinite. The attorney's duty to the court and the rule of law take precedence over a client's demands, and they cannot facilitate unlawful acts or perjury. This is sometimes referred to as overzealousness or over-advocacy. Common examples include the integration of frivolous lawsuits, discovery abuse and the suppression of evidence.

== Criticism ==
The degree to which an attorney should be a zealous advocate is an ongoing debate among legal ethicists and politicians. While prononents argue zealous advocacy is a fundamental principal of the adversarial system and common law in general, opponents believe that the doctrine should be (partially) abandoned, contending that it contributes to gamesmanship, unnecessarily aggressive litigation, excessive bureaucracy and public distrust of lawyers.

== See also ==
- Common law
- Rule of law
- Cab-rank rule
- Right to a fair trial
- Devil's advocate
