= Normal flex acres =

In United States agricultural law, Normal flex acreage was a provision of the Omnibus Budget Reconciliation Act of 1990 requiring a mandatory 15% reduction in payment acreage. Under this provision, producers were ineligible to receive deficiency payments on 15% of their crop acreage base (not including any acreage removed from production under any production adjustment program). Producers, however, were allowed to plant any crop on this acreage, except fruits, vegetables, and other prohibited crops. Flex acreage was eliminated by the 1996 farm bill (P.L. 104–127).

== See also ==
- Triple base plan
