= Set-aside program =

In United States agricultural policy, the set-aside program was a program under which farmers were required to set aside a certain percentage of their total planted acreage and devote this land to approved conservation uses (such as grasses, legumes, and small grain which is not allowed to mature) in order to be eligible for nonrecourse loans and deficiency payments. Set-aside acreage was based on the number of acres a farmer actually planted in the program year as opposed to being based on prior crop years. The authority for set-aside was eliminated by the 1996 farm bill (P.L. 104-127).
