= Production contract =

Type of agricultural agreement in the United States of America

In United States agricultural policy, production contracts specify who supplies the production inputs, the quality and quantity of the commodity to be produced, and the compensation for the producer; under such contracts, the farmer is paid to provide housing and care for the animals until they are ready for market, but the contractor actually owns the animals.

In 1997, according to the United States Department of Agriculture, about 70% of the value of poultry production was under production contracts, 33% of hogs, and 14% of cattle.

== See also ==
- Marketing contract
- Production flexibility contract
