= Crop acreage base =

Crop-specific measure of acres planted

Crop acreage base is a crop-specific measure equal to the average number of acres planted (or considered planted) to a particular program crop for a specified number of years. The crop-specific nature of this measurement was important prior to the 1996 farm bill (P.L. 104-127), which adopted an inclusive measure of base acreage and allowed planting flexibility among the program crops. The sum of the crop acreage bases for all program crops on a farm could not exceed the farm acreage. The acreage base was used in determining the number of acres a farmer, under an acreage reduction program, had to remove from normal crop production and devote to conserving uses in order to be eligible for USDA price and income supports.

== See also ==
- Base acreage
- Farm acreage base
