= Onion market loss assistance =

Onion market loss assistance refers to market loss assistance provided by the United States Federal Government to onion producers in Orange County, New York, that suffered losses to onion crops during one or more of the 1996 through 2000 drop years. The 2002 farm bill (P.L. 107–171, Title X, Subtitle A, Section 10106) provided $10 million of Commodity Credit Corporation (CCC) funds for this purpose.
