= Farm acreage base =

Total of the crop acreage bases for a farm for a year

In United States agricultural policy, Farm acreage base referred to the total of the crop acreage bases (wheat, feed grains, cotton, and rice) for a farm for a year, the average acreage planted to soybeans and other non-program crops, and the average acreage devoted to conserving uses (excluding Acreage Reduction Program land) The 1996 farm bill (P.L. 104–127) and the 2002 farm bill (P.L. 107–121) eliminate the need to calculate a farm acreage base.
