= Considered planted =

In the United States, under some previous commodity support laws, crop acreage bases were, in general, calculated as a 5-year average of planted and considered planted acreage. Acreage considered planted included acreage idled under production adjustment programs or idled for weather-related reasons or natural disasters; acreage devoted to conservation purposes or planted to certain other allowed commodities; and acreage USDA determined was necessary for fair and equitable treatment.
