= Environmental Conservation Acreage Reserve Program =

Environmental program of the US Government

The Environmental Conservation Acreage Reserve Program (ECARP) was a United States umbrella program authorized by the Food, Agriculture, Conservation, and Trade Act of 1990 (P.L. 101–624) that includes the Conservation Reserve Program, and the Wetland Reserve Program. The Federal Agriculture Improvement and Reform Act of 1996 (P.L. 104–127) continued the CRP and WRP and created the Environmental Quality Incentives Program.

The goal of the ECARP was to provide long-term protection of environmentally sensitive land. Contracts, easements, and cost-share payments were used to assist landowners and operators of farms and ranches to conserve and enhance soil, water, and related natural resources, including grazing land, wetland, and wildlife habitat. The Farm Security and Rural Investment Act of 2002 (P.L. 107–171, Sec. 2006) replaced ECARP with the Comprehensive Conservation Enhancement Program (CCHP).
