= Permitted acreage =

In United States agricultural policy, permitted acreage refers to the acreage on which a farm program participant was permitted to grow a program crop after satisfying acreage reduction requirements. For example, when a 10% acreage reduction program was in effect for wheat, a farmer with a 100-acre (0.40 km^{2}) wheat base could grow wheat on 90 acres (360,000 m^{2}), the permitted acres. Limits on production were eliminated under the 2002 farm bill (P.L. 101-171) through crop year 2007, as also was done under the 1996 farm bill (P.L. 104-127).
