= Marketing contract =

In United States agricultural policy, under a marketing contract, prices (or pricing mechanisms) are established for a commodity before harvest or before the commodity is ready for marketing. Most management decisions remain with the grower, who retains ownership of both production inputs and output until delivery. The farmer assumes the risks of production but shares price risks with the contractor.

Marketing contracts are commonly used for crops and not livestock. According to the USDA, about 40% of the value of all fruits and vegetables produced in 1997 were under marketing contracts. Marketing contract shares for selected other commodities were:

- sugar beets, 82%;
- milk, 60%;
- cotton, 33%;
- cattle, 10%;
- soybeans, 9.4%;
- corn, 8%.

== See also ==
- Production contract
