= Ex fida bona =

Ex fida bona is a Latin phrase for the principle of Roman law that a judge is to premise his judgement on "good business norms" and that parties to a contract are to satisfy their contractual obligations, thus permitting the parties to trust each other. A contract should be according to the branch norms unless otherwise expressly provided. The principle was a condition for permanent trading relations during the ancient Roman Republic: in the second century BC the Roman praetors began applying the principle while commerce in the Mediterranean increased.
