= Market loss payments =

Market loss payments is a United States government designation first used in the Omnibus Consolidated and Emergency Appropriations Act, FY1999 (P.L. 105–277) to describe the $3.1 billion in emergency income support payments authorized for eligible grain, cotton, and dairy farmers.

The Act stated that such funds were to compensate farmers for the loss of 1998 income caused by “regional economic dislocation, unilateral trade sanctions, and the failure of the government to pursue trade opportunities aggressively.” Similar economic emergency support payments for selected commodities were subsequently enacted in P.L. 106-78 ($6.5 billion), in P.L. 106-224 ($6.5 billion), in P.L. 106-387 ($0.9 billion), and in P.L. 107-25 ($5.5 billion). Market loss assistance to grain and cotton producers were distributed in parallel manner to the contract payments authorized by the Agricultural Market Transition Act.

== See also ==
- Agricultural subsidy
- Apple Market Loss Assistance Program
- Dairy Market Loss Assistance
- Onion market loss assistance
