= Apple Market Loss Assistance Program =

The Apple Market Loss Assistance Program is a program of the Farm Service Agency that has made payments to apple producers to partially offset revenue losses from low prices caused by the loss of markets. The 2002 farm bill (P.L. 107-171, Sec. 10105) mandated the payment of $94 million by the Commodity Credit Corporation (CCC) for lost markets in crop year 2000. Earlier funding was mandated for the 2000 crop of apples by P.L. 107-76, Sec. 741 ($75 million), and for the 1998 and 1999 apple crops by P.L. 106-387, Sec. 811 ($100 million).

== See also ==
- Market loss assistance
