= Roy Simon =

American professor

Roy D. Simon is the Howard Lichtenstein Distinguished Professor Emeritus of Legal Ethics at Hofstra University. He resides in New York City, and is the author of twenty-four editions of Simon's New York Rules of Professional Conduct Annotated.

He was the 2008 Democratic Party nominee for the New York State Senate, running against then-Republican State Senate Majority Leader Dean Skelos. At the time, Simon resided in West Hempstead and ran to be the State Senator representing the Ninth District in Long Island. Some of these communities include the Five Towns, Valley Stream, Rockville Centre, and others. Political pundits acknowledged that it would be difficult to oust Dean Skelos. It was difficult. The vote was 65% for Skelos and 35% for Simon.

== Education and career ==
Simon graduated from Highland Park High School (Highland Park, Illinois) and then went on to attended Williams College for his undergraduate degree and NYU Law School for his JD. While at NYU Law School he served as editor-in-chief of the New York University Law Review. He also served as a clerk to the U.S. District Judge Robert R. Merhige Jr. in Richmond, Virginia and then practiced law at Jenner & Block in Chicago. He started his academic career as an instructor at the Washington University School of Law before being appointed to the post of professor at the Maurice A. Deane School of Law at Hofstra University nine years later where he served as Howard Lichtenstein Distinguished Professor of Legal Ethics from 2003 to 2011. An author of New York Rules of Professional Conduct Annotated. Simon served as monthly columnist for the New York Professional Responsibility Report, from 1998 to 2011 and prior to it served as chairman for the Nassau County Bar. Simon is a member of the NY State Bar since 1995. He currently serves as chairman of the NY State Bar's Committee on Standards of Professional Conduct, and prior to it held the same position for its Committee on Professional Ethics from 2008 to 2011. Simon has served on Bar Association Committees on the role of artificial intelligence and has written a short paper on the subject.

== Involvement in the case: Perkins Coie LLP v. U.S. Department of Justice, et al. ==
On March 6, 2025, President Donald J. Trump issued Executive Order (EO) 14230, entitled “Addressing Risks from Perkins Coie LLP.” The Executive Order calls for several actions by the Federal Government restricting the access of Perkins Coie attorneys from entering Federal buildings, suspending security clearances of Perkins Coie employees, and to cease any business that the Federal Government conducts through contracts with Perkins Coie. This is one of several cases in response to Targeting of law firms and lawyers under the second Trump administration. Roy Simon, as an expert on legal ethics, was retained by Williams & Connolly, in its capacity as counsel for Plaintiff Perkins Coie LLP, to provide expert opinion on the consequences of this EO. Simon’s Declaration was filed with the U.S. District Court of the District of Columbia on March 11, 2025. The essence of Simon’s Declaration was that the EO “will in all likelihood (i) chill the rights of clients to petition government for redress of grievances and to peaceably assemble, as guaranteed by the First Amendment, (ii) deprive many clients of due process of law under the Fifth Amendment, and (iii) deprive many clients of the right to effective assistance of counsel under the Sixth Amendment.”

On May 2, 2025, District Court Judge Beryl A. Howell issued her Opinion stating that Perkins Coie LLP is “entitled to summary judgment and declaratory and permanent injunctive relief . . . and the government’s motion to dismiss is denied.” On page 86 of her Opinion Judge Howell specifically cites Simon’s Declaration emphasizing the negative consequences the EO would have on limiting potential clients choice of counsel and would “…interfere with Perkins Coie’s ability to represent a client competently…”
