= Set-aside =

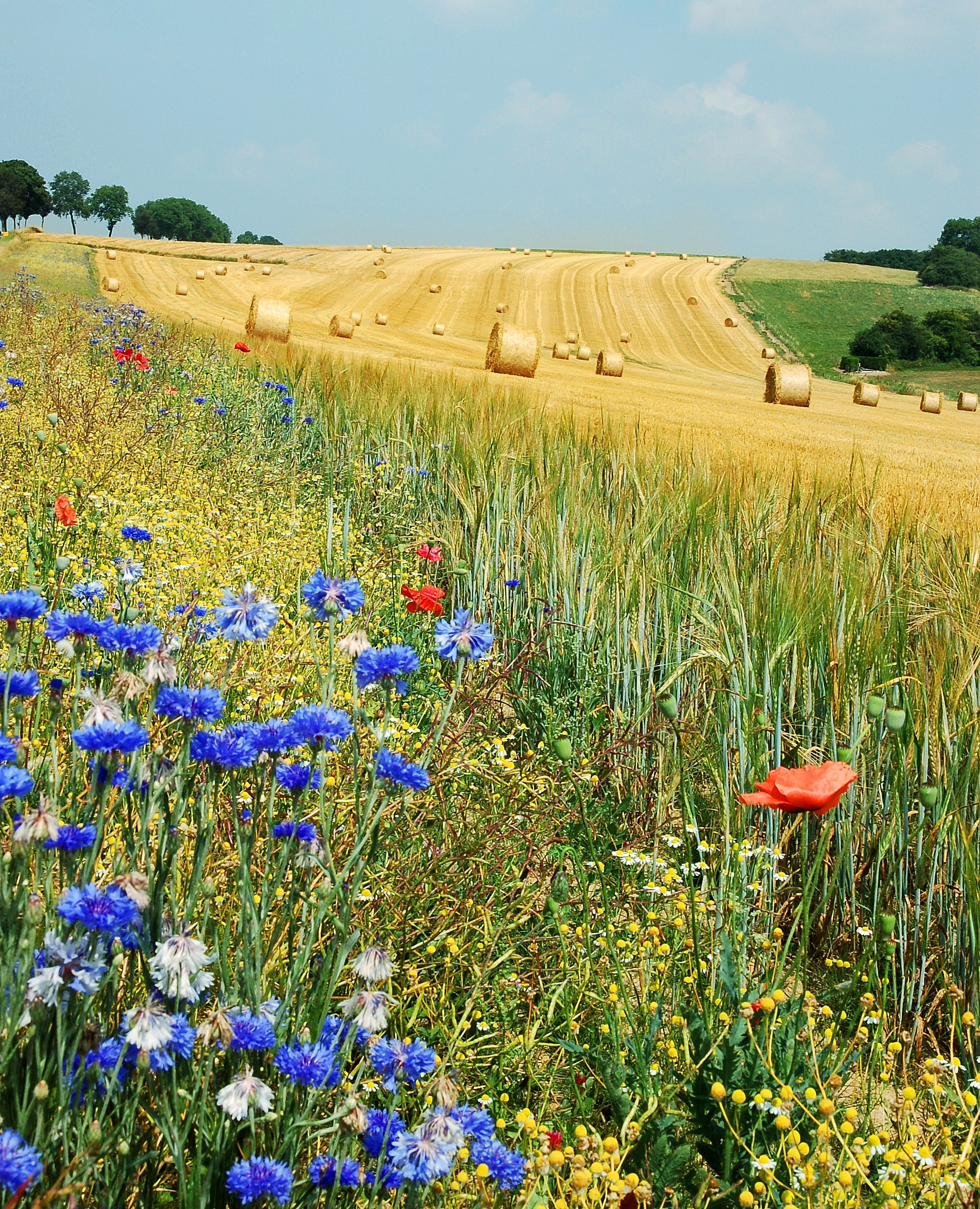
Wildflowers

Set-aside was an incentive scheme introduced by the European Economic Community (EEC) in 1988 (Regulation (EEC) 1272/88), to (i) help reduce the large and costly surpluses produced in Europe under the guaranteed price system of the Common Agricultural Policy (CAP); and (ii) to deliver some environmental benefits following considerable damage to agricultural ecosystems and wildlife as a result of the intensification of agriculture.

It sought to achieve this by requiring that farmers leave a proportion of their land out of intensive production. Such land is said to be 'set-aside'.

== History ==
Set-aside became compulsory in 1992 for large arable farmers as part of the MacSharry reform of the Common Agricultural Policy. It was originally set at 15% and reduced to 10% in 1996. Following the introduction of decoupled payments in 2005, farmers who had historically claimed set-aside were awarded a number of set-aside 'entitlements' equivalent to the area they had previously set-aside. In order to receive payment on these set-aside entitlements, an equivalent number of hectares had to be removed from agricultural production.

Set-aside land was shown to be an effective way to improve soil chemistry and increase biodiversity on arable farmland, especially on 5-year non-rotational set-aside.

On 16 July 2007, the European Commission (EC) announced its intention to publish a proposal to reduce the set-aside requirement to 0% in 2008, and the proposal was adopted on 26 September 2007. This was to help mitigate current shortages in the EU cereals market, increase cereals supply to the market and therefore reduce prices following two consecutive lower EU harvests.

The EC agreed in November 2008 to abolish set-aside completely through the CAP Health Check.

== See also ==
- Ley farming, an agricultural system where the field is alternately seeded for grain and left fallow
- Set-aside program – similar U.S.program
