= Agricultural Market Transition Act =

The Agricultural Market Transition Act (AMTA) — Title I of the 1996 U.S. farm bill (P.L. 104-127) — allowed farmers who had participated in the wheat, feed grain, cotton, and rice programs in any one of the five years prior to 1996 to enter into seven-year production flexibility contracts for 1996-2002. Total national production flexibility contract payments (sometimes called AMTA payments, or contract payments) for each fiscal year were fixed in the law. The AMTA allowed farmers to plant 100% of their total contract acreage to any crop except fruits and vegetables, and receive a full payment. Land had to be maintained in agricultural uses. Unlimited haying and grazing and planting and harvesting alfalfa and other forage crops was permitted with no reduction in payments. AMTA commodity support provisions were replaced by the 2002 farm bill (P.L. 101-171, Title I), a six-year farm bill.

== Contract payments under AMTA ==
Some $36 billion in Production Flexibility Contract payments made to farmers for contract crops for fiscal years 1996-2002 under Title I of the 1996 farm bill (P.L. 104-127), known as the Agricultural Market Transition Act (AMTA). The total amount made available for each fiscal year was specified in the Act and allocated to commodities each fiscal year using a set of percentages also specified in the Act. These percentages were based on CBO’s February 1995 baseline forecast of what deficiency payments would have been if provisions in effect for the 1995 crop had been extended. For example, for fiscal 1997, the total allocation for wheat was 26% of total annual payments of $5.385 billion, or $1.414 billion. The annual payment rate for wheat equaled total spending ($1.414 billion) divided by the sum of all individual wheat payment contract quantities for the year. As with other program commodities, an individual farm’s payment quantity equaled the farm’s program payment yield multiplied by 85% of the farm’s wheat contract acreage. Program yields under the 1996 Act were determined in the same manner as under the 1949 Act for 1995 crops. An individual farmer’s PFC payment was the payment quantity times the annual payment rate. The payment was made by September 30 of each of the fiscal years 1996 through 2002. Producers also could choose to receive 50% of the contract payment in December or January of the fiscal year. Farmers had near total planting flexibility on the contract acres (the exception being fruits and vegetables) as well as on the remainder of the farm. PFC contract payments were replaced by Direct and Counter-cyclical Program (DCP) payments beginning with crop year 2002 under the 2002 farm bill (P.L. 101-171, Sec. 1101-1108).
