= Legal ethics =

Professional ethics in the legal practice

Legal ethics are principles of conduct that members of the legal profession are expected to observe in their practice. They are an outgrowth of the development of the legal profession itself.

== In the United States ==
In the U.S., each state or territory has a code of professional conduct dictating rules of ethics. These may be adopted by the respective state legislatures and/or judicial systems. The American Bar Association has promulgated the Model Rules of Professional Conduct which, while formally only a recommendation by a private body, have been influential in many jurisdictions. The Model Rules address many topics which are found in state ethics rules, including the client-lawyer relationship, duties of a lawyer as advocate in adversary proceedings, dealings with persons other than clients, law firms and associations, public service, advertising, and maintaining the integrity of the profession. Respect of client confidence, candor toward the tribunal, truthfulness in statements to others, and professional independence are some of the defining features of legal ethics.

Maynard Pirsig, published one of the first course books on legal ethics, Cases and Materials on Legal Ethics, 1949. Maynard Pirsig also published the definition of Legal Ethics, in Encyclopedia Britannica, 1974.

Some U.S. states, including New York, require applicants seeking to become attorneys to have taken a course in professional responsibility during law school.

=== Admission ===
The Multistate Professional Responsibility Examination (MPRE) is used to measure examinees' knowledge and understanding of established standards related to the professional conduct of lawyers. The MPRE is a prerequisite or corequisite to the bar examination for admission as an attorney at law in 48 of the 50 states of the United States, as well as the District of Columbia, Guam, the Northern Mariana Islands, the U.S. Virgin Islands, and the Republic of Palau. Of the 56 jurisdictions within the United States, only Puerto Rico, and Wisconsin do not use the MPRE; however, these jurisdictions still incorporate local ethics rules in their respective bar examinations.

Like many other examinations, bar examinees are expected to complete the test without cheating. In New York, for example, the nullification of bar exam results for cheating and other misconducts, is enforced under Board Rule 6000.13 of the New York Board of Law Examiners (NYBOLE).

== Enforcement ==
=== United States ===
Every state in the United States has a regulatory body (usually called a state bar association) that polices lawyer conduct. When lawyers are licensed to practice in a state, those lawyers subject themselves to this authority. Overall responsibility often lies with the highest court in a state (such as state supreme court). The state bar associations, often in consultation with the court, adopt a set of rules that set forth the applicable ethical duties. As of 2013, 48 states have adopted a version of the American Bar Association's model rules. California is the only state that has not adopted either—instead these states have written their own rules from scratch.

There was once some debate over whether state ethical rules apply to federal prosecutors. The Department of Justice has held differing opinions through different administrations, with the Thornburgh Memo suggesting these rules do not apply, and the Reno Rules asserting that they do apply. Now, 28 U.S.C. § 530B provides that government attorneys are subject to the state ethics laws in the state in which they practice.

Lawyers who fail to comply with local rules of ethics may be subjected to discipline ranging from private (non-public) reprimand to disbarment.

==== Artificial intelligence and legal filings ====
In June 2023, a federal judge sanctioned two lawyers who submitted a legal brief containing fictitious case citations generated by ChatGPT.

In July 2024, the American Bar Association issued its first formal ethics guidance (Formal Opinion 512) concerning generative artificial intelligence, stating that existing professional conduct rules governing competence, confidentiality, communication, and supervisory responsibilities also apply to lawyers' use of AI tools. In January 2026, the ABA published additional guidance for the responsible use of AI in law firms.

Since 2023, U.S. courts have increasingly sanctioned lawyers and litigants for submitting filings containing fictitious case citations and other AI-generated errors. Courts have emphasized that lawyers remain responsible for verifying the accuracy of legal authorities and representations submitted to the court, even when using AI-assisted tools. Federal judges in California ordered the sanctioned lawyers to complete courses on generative artificial intelligence and legal ethics.

=== Tanzania ===
In Tanzania, professional ethics for the members of private bar (advocates) are regulated by the Advocates Act, Cap. 341 which is principal legislation and the Advocates (Professional conducts and Etiquette) Regulations, 2018 (Government Notice No. 118 of 2018) which is subsidiary legislation enacted by the National Advocates Committee (formerly known as the Advocates Committee).

The National Advocate is disciplinary authority of advocates in Tanzania. The said Committee in its capacity as disciplinary authority enjoys power to remove advocates from the Roll of Advocates, suspend advocate and issue warning against advocate.

=== India ===
In India, under the Advocates Act of 1961, the Bar Council of India is responsible for creating rules for registering advocates, regulation of legal ethics, and for administering disciplinary action. In India a legal law firm named Legalethics provides legal awareness for people who need it because of innocence.

=== Australia ===
In New South Wales, reforms commencing from July 1, 2015, brought a uniform regulatory system to the legal profession regarding billing arrangements, discipline procedures and complaints handling processing. An inter jurisdictional Legal Services Council was established in order to regulate the legal profession and its delivery of legal services. This resulted in the creation of the Legal Profession Uniform Law Australian Solicitors' Conduct Rules 2015 and the Legal Profession Uniform Conduct Barristers' Rules 2015.

The States and Territories of Australia are regulated through co-regulation, self-regulation and independent regulation.

- New South Wales is co-regulated by the Law Society of NSW, the NSW Bar Association and the Legal Services Commissioner.
- Queensland is co-regulated by the Law Society of Queensland, Bar Association of Queensland and the Legal Services Commissioner.
- Tasmania is self-regulated through the Law Society of Tasmania.
- Victoria is co-regulated in collaboration with the Victorian Legal Services Board and Commissioner, the Law Institute of Victoria and the Victorian Bar
- South Australia is independently regulated by the Legal Practitioners Conduct Board.
- Western Australia is independently regulated through the Legal Practice Board and the Legal Profession Complaints Committee.
- The Northern Territory is self-regulated by the Law Society of the Northern Territory.
- The Australian Capital Territory is self-regulated by the Law Society of the ACT, the ACT Bar Association and the Complaints Investigating Committee.

== See also ==
- Admission to practice law
- Judicial activism
- Judicial misconduct
- Sentencing disparity
- Selective prosecution
- Zealous advocacy
