= Bona fide (disambiguation) =

Bona fide (in Latin) or good faith is a sincere intention to be fair, open and honest.

Bona fide, Bonafide or Bonafied, may also refer to:

== Music ==
- Bonafied, a 2013 album by Richard Bona
- Bonafide (Maxi Priest album), 1990
- Bonafide (Jon B. album), 1995
- Bona Fide, a 2002 album by Wishbone Ash
- Bone-A-Fide, 2005 album by Christian rapper T-Bone
- Bonafide (band), Swedish hard rock band

== Other uses ==
- Bonafide Pictures, Australian film production company
- Credentials, bona fides

== See also ==
- "Bonafide Girl", 2008 single by Shaggy
- Ex fida bona, a legal principle
