= Good-faith provisions (2002 US farm bill) =

United States farm bill passed in 2002

The good-faith provisions, enacted in the 2002 farm bill (P.L. 107–171, Sec. 1613), allow the USDA to forgive a participant from the loss of commodity and conservation program benefits when it is determined that the participant either tried but failed to fully comply with program requirements, or relied on faulty (incorrect) advice from the USDA. This provision applies to conservation and commodity programs, but not to credit or crop insurance programs.
