= Deficiency payments =

In the United States, deficiency payments are direct government payments made to farmers who participated in annual commodity programs for wheat, feed grains, rice, or cotton, prior to 1996.

- The crop-specific deficiency payment rate was based on the difference between the legislatively set target price and the lower national average market price during a specified time.
- The total payment was equal to the payment rate multiplied by a farm's eligible payment acreage and the program payment yield established for the particular farm.

In the latter years of the program, farmers could receive up to one-half of their projected deficiency payments at program signup. If actual deficiency payments, which were determined after the crop year, were less than advance deficiency payments, the farmer was required to reimburse the government for the difference, except for zero, 50/85-92 payments.

The 1996 farm bill (P.L. 107-171) eliminated deficiency payments and replaced them with production flexibility contract payments. The 2002 farm bill (P.L. 101-171, Sec. 1104) reinstituted deficiency payments as counter-cyclical payments with somewhat different payment calculations.

== India ==
In 2018, a price deficiency payment scheme for farmers was launched by the government of India.
