= Base acreage =

In United States agricultural law, a farm’s base acreage is its crop-specific acreage of wheat, corn, grain sorghum, barley, oats, upland cotton, soybeans, canola, flax, mustard, rapeseed, safflower, sunflowers, and rice eligible to enroll in the Direct and Counter-cyclical Program (DCP) under the 2002 farm bill (P.L. 101-171, Sec. 1101-1108). A farmer’s crop acreage base is reduced by the portion of cropland placed in the Conservation Reserve Program (CRP) but increased by CRP base acreage leaving the CRP. Farmers have the choice of base acreage used to calculate Production Flexibility Contract payments for crop year 2002, or the average of acres planted for crop years 1998 through 2001.

== See also ==
- Farm acreage base
