= Production flexibility contract =

United States agricultural contract type

In the United States, a production flexibility contract is a 7-year contract covering crop years 1996-2002, authorized by the 1996 farm bill (P.L. 104-127) between the Commodity Credit Corporation (CCC) and farmers, which makes fixed income support payments. Farmers were given production flexibility and diversification options on their contract acres not previously allowed on base acres. Each farm’s total payment was the payment rate times the payment quantity for participating base acres. In exchange for annual fixed payments, the owner or operator agreed to comply with the applicable conservation plan for the farm, the wetland protection requirements currently in law, and the constraints on growing fruits and vegetables on contract acres. Land enrolled in a contract had to be maintained in an agricultural or related activity. The law stated that not more than $35.6 billion would be paid over the 7-year period, in declining annual amounts from $5.3 billion in FY1996 to $4.0 billion in FY in 2002. The annual payments were allocated among commodities similar to historical deficiency payments, with 53.6% going to feed grains, 26.3% for wheat, 11.6% for upland cotton, and 8.5% for rice. Target prices and deficiency payments, authorized in the 1973 farm bill, were eliminated. The 2002 farm bill (P.L. 101-171, Sec. 1105) replaced this 7-year contract with an annual producer agreement (contract) required for participation in the Direct and Counter-cyclical Program (DCP).

== See also ==
- Production contract
- Marketing contract
