= Direct and Counter-Cyclical Program =

The Direct and Counter-cyclical Payment Program (DCP) of the USDA provides payments to eligible producers on farms enrolled for the 2002 through 2007 crop years. There are two types of DCP payments – direct payments and counter-cyclical payments. Both are computed using the base acres and payment yields established for the farm. DCP was authorized by the 2002 Farm Bill and is administered by the Farm Service Agency (FSA).

== Eligible producers ==
To be eligible for payments under DCP, owners, operators, landlords, tenants, or sharecroppers must:

- share in the risk of producing a crop on base acres on a farm enrolled in DCP, and be entitled to share in the crop available for marketing from the base acres or would have shared had a crop been produced;
- annually report the use of the farm's cropland acreage;
- comply with conservation and wetland protection requirements on all of their land;
- comply with planting flexibility requirements;
- use the base acres for agricultural or related activities;
- and protect all base acres from erosion, including providing sufficient cover as determined necessary by the county FSA committee, and control weeds.

== Eligible commodities ==
Base acres and payment yields are established for the following commodities: barley; corn; grain sorghum, including dual purpose varieties that can be harvested as grain; oats; canola, crambe, flax, mustard, rapeseed, safflower, sesame and sunflower, including oil and non-oil varieties; peanuts, beginning in 2003; rice, excluding wild rice; soybeans; upland cotton; and wheat.

== Direct payments ==
The 2002 Farm Bill replaced production flexibility contract (PFC) payments (which were established by the Federal Agriculture Improvement and Reform Act of 1996) with direct payments. Direct payments are not based on producers’ current production choices, but are tied to acreage bases and yields. Because direct payments provide no incentive to increase production of any certain crop, the payments support farm income without distorting producers’ current production decisions.

For the 2002-crop year only, producers’ final direct payments were reduced by the 2002 PFC payments they had already received.

== Counter-cyclical payments ==
The Farm Bill (P.L. 101-171, Sec. 1101-1108) added counter-cyclical payments (CCP), which provide support counter to the cycle of market prices as part of a “safety net” in the event of low crop prices. Counter-cyclical payments for a commodity are only issued if the effective price for a commodity is below the target price for the commodity. Counter-cyclical payments are made to participating producers when the marketing year average price received by farmers for a covered commodity is less than the target price. The total payment to a producer is the payment acres (85% of base acres) times the payment rate (target price minus average market price, except not more than the difference between the target price and the sum of the national loan rate and the direct payment rate).

Counter-cyclical payments are not available for other oilseeds because the sum of their national loan rate and direct payment rate is equal to or greater than their target price.

== Refund ==
Producers must refund to FSA counter-cyclical payments that exceed the actual counter-cyclical payment for each respective crop. This situation may occur when actual market prices exceed the projected market prices used in determining the partial countercyclical payment rates.

== Base acres ==
Farm owners, or their designees, were provided a one-time opportunity to choose from five options in determining DCP base acres. “Base acres” means, with respect to a covered commodity on a farm, the number of acres of the crop established by the election of the owner or owners of the farm. The options in determining DCP base acres were: to use 2002 PFC acreage to establish DCP base acres; to use 2002 PFC acreage and add oilseed base history for the 1998-2001 crop years (three options were available under this scenario that allowed flexibility between oilseed base acres and other crop base acres); and to calculate all base acres using the farm's planted and approved prevented planted history from 1998 to 2001.

== Direct payment yields ==
Direct payment yields for wheat, feed grains, cotton, and rice on a farm are the 2002 PFC payment yields for the applicable crops on the farm. Yields used to calculate direct payments cannot be updated; the yields must be those used for PFC.

For covered commodities without PFC program payment yields, FSA assigned a direct payment yield using the PFC yield of similar farms. The direct payment yield for oilseeds is calculated by multiplying the 1998 through 2001 average yield for the oilseed times the historic yield ratio for the oilseed.

== Counter-cyclical payment yields ==
Farm owners, or their designees, who updated their base acres had a one-time opportunity to also partially update their counter-cyclical payment yields. using one of the following two methods:

- 93.5 percent of the 1998-2001 average yield; or
- the direct payment yield (PFC yield) plus 70 percent of the difference between the 1998- 2001 average and the direct payment yield.

Farm owners had to use the same counter-cyclical payment yield method for all eligible commodities on a farm. If farm owners did not choose to partially update their counter-cyclical payment yields, then their established PFC payment yields are used to calculate counter-cyclical payments.

== See also ==
- Triple base plan
