= Economy of East Germany =

Economy of the GDR
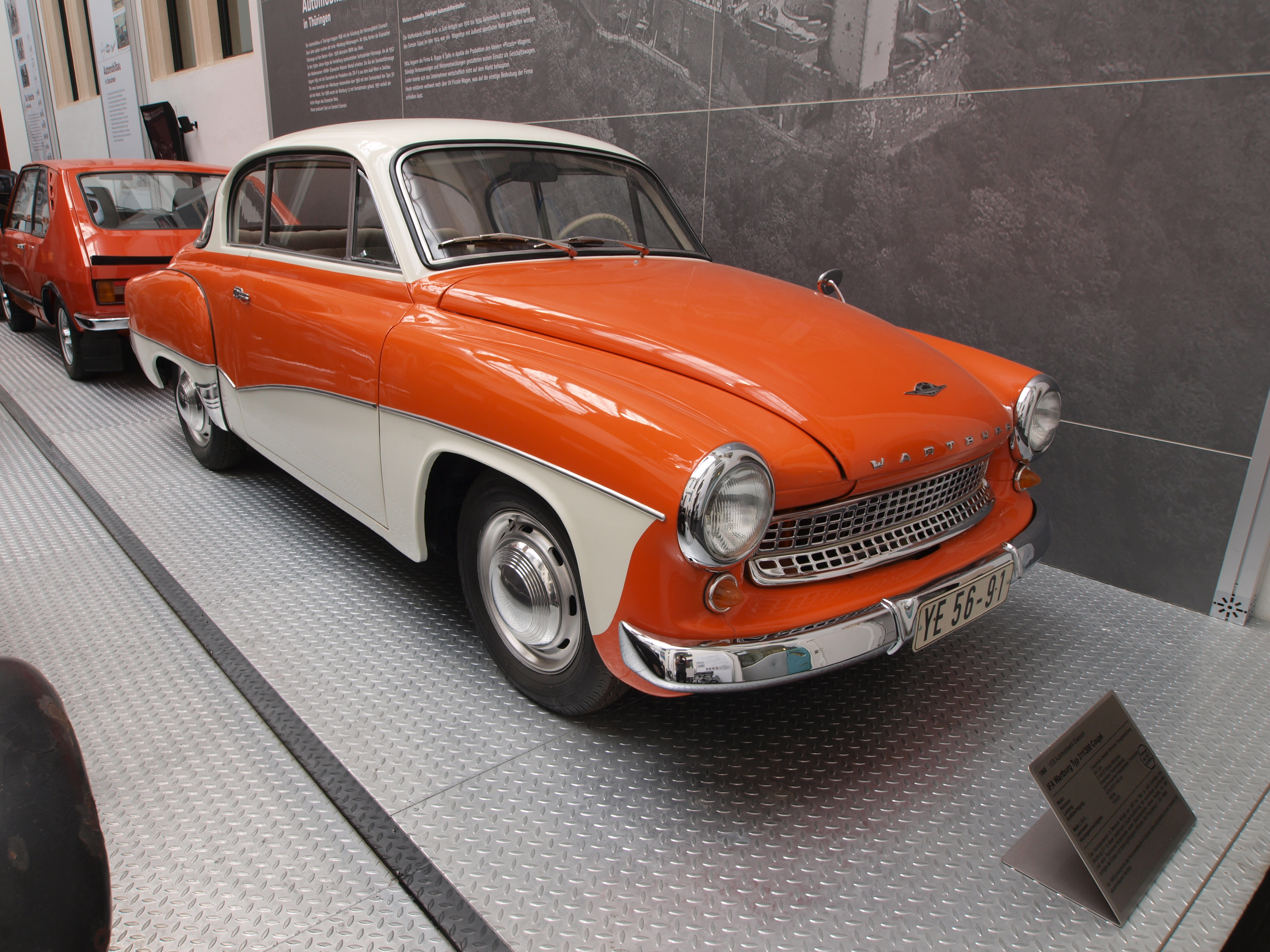
- The Wartburg 311. During the 1950s and 1960s, over 1.8 million automobiles of the East German marque Wartburg were produced in the country.
- Currency: East German mark
- Fiscal year: 1 January – 31 December (calendar year)
- Trade organisations: Comecon and others.

Statistics
- GDP: $160 billion (1989) (Nominal GNP; 17th)
- GDP per capita: $9,679 (1989) (Nominal GNP; 26th) (official exchange rate)
- GDP by sector: 90% in industry and other non-agricultural sectors; 10% of GNP in agriculture (1987)
- Gini coefficient: 0.185 (1990)
- Labour force: 8,960,000 (1987)
- Labour force by occupation: 37.5% industry, 21.1% services, 10.8% agriculture and forestry, 10.3% commerce, 7.4% transport and communications, 6.6% construction, 3.1% handicrafts, 3.2% other (1987)
- Main industries: Motor vehicles, Heavy industry, Electronics, Steel, Light industry, Defense

External
- Exports: $30.7 billion (1988)
- Export goods: Machinery, transport equipment, fuel, metals, consumer goods, chemical products, building materials, semi manufactured goods and processed foodstuffs (1988)
- Main export partners: USSR, Czechoslovakia, Poland, West Germany, Hungary, Bulgaria, Switzerland, Romania (1988)
- Imports: $31.0 billion (1988)
- Import goods: Fuels, metals, machinery, transport equipment, chemical products and building materials (1988)
- Main import partners: CMEA countries 65%, non-Communist countries 33%, other 2% (1988)
- Gross external debt: $20.6 billion (1989)

Public finance
- Revenue: $123.5 billion (1986)
- Spending: $123.2 billion, including capital expenditures of $33 billion (1986)
- Economic aid: $4.0 billion extended bilaterally to non-Communist and less developed countries (1956-1988)
- All values, unless otherwise stated, are in US dollars.

Economic activity in East Germany

The economy of the German Democratic Republic (East Germany; GDR, DDR) was a command economy following the model of the Soviet Union based on the principles of Marxism-Leninism. Sharing many characteristics with fellow Comecon member states — the East German economy stood in stark contrast to the social democratic economies of Western Europe. The state established production targets, set prices, and also allocated resources, codifying these decisions in comprehensive plans. The means of production were almost entirely state-owned. The GDR had an above-average standard of living compared to other Eastern Bloc countries or the Soviet Union, and enjoyed favorable duty and tariff terms with the West German market; in 1989, it was estimated that 50 to 60% of its trade was with Western countries. However by the mid-1980s its economy had reached a state of stagnation, contributing to the process of German reunification.

== History ==
=== Soviet occupation period ===
Each occupation power assumed authority in their respective zones by June 1945. The Allied powers originally pursued a common German policy, focused on denazification and demilitarization in preparation for the restoration of a democratic German nation-state.

Over time, the western and Soviet zones drifted apart economically. In 1946, the Soviet zone had a slight total factor productivity lead; wartime industrialization had contributed more to the eastern economy, and the destruction caused by the war was lighter than in the west. However, by 1948 the western zones had become more prosperous.

There were several reasons behind the backward economic situation in East Germany. While large sums had been poured into West Germany, especially by the United States, the Soviet Union not only put nothing into the economy of its zone but actually took out large amounts in reparations and occupation costs. Direct and indirect reparations paid by East Germany between 1946 and 1953 amounted to $14 billion in 1938 prices.

Military industries and those owned by the state, by Nazi Party members, and by war criminals were confiscated. These industries amounted to approximately 60% of total industrial production in the Soviet zone. Most heavy industry (constituting 20% of total production) was claimed by the Soviet Union as World War II reparations, and Soviet joint stock companies (German: Sowjetische Aktiengesellschaften - SAG) were formed. The remaining confiscated industrial property was nationalized, leaving 40% of total industrial production to private enterprise. The reparations seriously hindered the ability of East Germany to compete with West Germany economically.

While the dismantling of industrial capacity had a significant effect, the most important factor in explaining the initial divergence in economic performance was the separation of the eastern zone from its traditional West German market. The East German economy was dominated by consumer-goods manufacturers, and depended on raw materials and intermediate goods found exclusively in the West. East Germany had virtually no hard coal deposits, and only half of the fuel demand could be met domestically. In 1943 the East accounted for 0.5% of total output in coke, 1.6% in raw iron, and 6.9% in raw steel produced in post-war German territory. After the war, trade between East and West fell by a factor of 35.

Retail trade in the east was slowly being absorbed by two state-controlled organizations (Konsum and Handelsorganisation) which were given special preferences. On 2 January 1949, a two-year plan of economic reconstruction was launched, aiming at 81% of the 1936 production level, and, by cutting 30 per cent off production costs, hoping to raise the general wage level 12% to 15%. The plan also called for an increase in the daily food ration from 1,500 to 2,000 calories.

It was estimated that by 1949, 100 per cent of the automotive, between 90% and 100% of the chemical, and 93% of the fuel industries were in Soviet hands. By the end of 1950 East Germany had paid $3.7 bn of Russia's $10 bn reparations demand. After the death of Joseph Stalin and the June 1953 uprising, the Soviet Union began to return the East German factories it had taken as reparations.

In May 1949, Soviet Foreign Minister Andrei Vishinsky claimed that production in the Soviet occupation zone in March 1949 had reached 96.6 per cent of its 1936 level and that the government budget of the Soviet zone showed a surplus of 1 billion East German Marks, despite a 30% cut in taxes.

The following case is typical of the economic relationship between the two eastern bloc countries. According to documents supplied by a shipbuilding official who escaped from the East, ships ordered by the Soviet Union for 1954 cost $148 million to build, but the Soviets paid only $46 million for them; the difference of $102 million was absorbed by the GDR.

=== 1950s ===
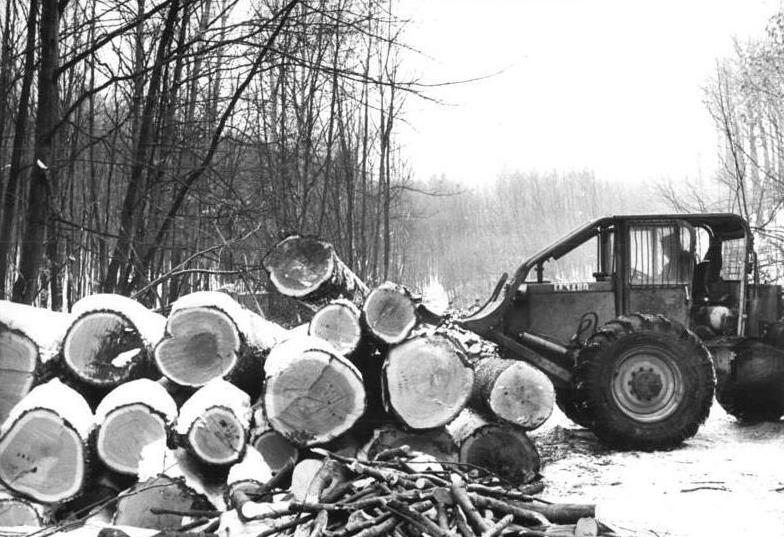
Forestry cooperative workers extracting wood from the Thuringian forests (Suhl, 1987)

The agrarian reform (Bodenreform) expropriated all land belonging to former Nazis and war criminals and generally limited ownership to 1 km^{2} (0.39 sq mi). Some 500 Junker estates were converted into agricultural production cooperatives (German: Landwirtschaftliche Produktionsgenossenschaft - LPG), and more than 30,000 km^{2} (12,000 sq mi) were distributed among 500,000 peasant farmers, agricultural laborers, and refugees. Compensation was paid only to active anti-Nazis. In September 1947 the Soviet military administration announced the completion of agrarian reform through the Soviet zone. This report listed 12,355 estates, totaling 6,000,000 acres (24,000 km^{2}), which had been seized and redistributed to 119,000 families of landless farmers, 83,000 refugee families, and some 300,000 in other categories. State farms were also established, called Volkseigenes Gut ("People's Owned Property").

The Third Party Congress of the Socialist Unity Party of Germany (Sozialistische Einheitspartei Deutschlands—SED) convened in July 1950 and emphasized industrial progress. The industrial sector, employing 40% of the working population, was subjected to further nationalization, which resulted in the formation of the "People's Enterprises" (German: Volkseigene Betriebe—VEB). These enterprises incorporated 75% of the industrial sector. The First Five Year Plan (1951–55) introduced centralized state planning; it stressed high production quotas for heavy industry and increased labor productivity. The pressures of the plan caused an exodus of GDR citizens to West Germany. The second SED Party Conference (less important than a party congress) convened from 9–12 July 1952. 1565 delegates, 494 guest-delegates, and over 2500 guests from the GDR and from many countries in the world participated in it. In the conference a new economic policy was adopted, "Planned Construction of Socialism". The plan called to strengthen the state-owned sector of the economy. Further goals were to implement the principles of uniform socialist planning and to use the economic laws of socialism systematically.

By 1953, one out of every seven industrial companies had relocated to the West. Joseph Stalin died in March 1953. In June 1953, the SED, hoping to give workers an improved standard of living, announced the New Course which replaced the "Planned Construction of Socialism." The New Course in the GDR was based on the economic policy initiated by Georgi Malenkov in the Soviet Union. Malenkov's policy, which aimed at improvement in the standard of living, stressed a shift in investment toward light industry and trade and a greater availability of consumer goods. The SED, in addition to shifting emphasis from heavy industry to consumer goods, initiated a program for alleviating economic hardships. This led to a reduction of delivery quotas and taxes, the availability of state loans to private business, and an increase in the allocation of production material.

While the New Course increased the availability of consumer goods, there were still high production quotas. When work quotas were raised in 1953, it led to the uprising of June 1953. Strikes and demonstrations happened in major industrial centers, and workers demanded economic reforms. The Volkspolizei and the Soviet Army suppressed the uprising, in which approximately 100 participants were killed.

When the 1953 budget was introduced in the Volkskammer on 4 February, economic exploitation in the Soviet interest was still the dominant trend. The budget envisaged expenditures of 34.688 bn East marks, an increase of about 10% over the 31.730 bn of the 1952 budget. Its main object was to provide investments for strengthening the economy and for national defense.

In 1956, at the 20th Congress of the Communist Party of the Soviet Union, First Secretary Nikita Khrushchev repudiated Stalinism, in his so-called ‘Secret Speech’ to selected members of the Congress.

Around this time, an academic intelligentsia within the SED leadership demanded reform. To this end, Wolfgang Harich issued a platform advocating radical changes in the GDR. In late 1956, he and his associates were quickly purged from the SED ranks and imprisoned.

An SED party plenum in July 1956 confirmed Walter Ulbricht's leadership and presented the Second Five-Year Plan (1956–60). The plan employed the slogan "modernization, mechanization, and automation" to emphasize the new focus on technological progress. At the plenum, the regime announced its intention to develop nuclear energy, and the first nuclear reactor in the GDR was activated in 1957. Decision was also made to build the first nuclear power reactor, the Rheinsberg Nuclear Power Plant, which started commercial production in 1966. The government increased industrial production quotas by 55% and renewed emphasis on heavy industry.

The Second Five-Year Plan committed the GDR to accelerated efforts toward agricultural collectivization and nationalization and completion of the nationalization of the industrial sector. By 1958 the agricultural sector still consisted primarily of the 750,000 privately owned farms that comprised 70% of all arable land; only 6,000 LPGs had been formed. In 1958–59 the SED placed quotas on private farmers and sent teams to villages in an effort to encourage voluntary collectivization. In November and December 1959 some law-breaking farmers were arrested by the Stasi.

An extensive economic management reform by the SED in February 1958 included the transfer of a large number of industrial ministries to the State Planning Commission. In order to accelerate the nationalization of industry, the SED offered entrepreneurs 50% partnership incentives for transforming their firms into VEBs.

=== 1960s ===
By mid-1960, nearly 85% of all arable land was incorporated in more than 19,000 Landwirtschaftliche Produktionsgenossenschaft; state farms comprised another 6%. By 1961 the socialist sector produced 90% of the GDR's agricultural products. As more farmers fled to the West, a crop failure occurred in 1961, which was made worse by unfavorable weather.

At the close of 1960, private enterprise controlled only 9% of total industrial production. Production cooperatives (Produktionsgenossenschaften—PGs) incorporated one-third of the artisan sector during 1960–61, a rise from 6% in 1958. The opening of the new port of Rostock in 1960 reduced the country's dependency on the West German port of Hamburg.

The Second Five-Year Plan encountered difficulties, and the government replaced it with the Seven-Year Plan (1959–65). The new plan aimed at achieving West Germany's per capita production by the end of 1961, set higher production quotas, and called for an 85% increase in labor productivity. Emigration again increased, totaling 143,000 in 1959 and 199,000 in 1960. The majority of the emigrants were white collar workers, and 50% were under 25 years of age. The labor drain exceeded a total of 2.5 million citizens between 1949 and 1961.

The annual industrial growth rate declined steadily after 1959. The Soviet Union therefore recommended that East Germany implement the reforms of Soviet economist Evsei Liberman, an advocate of the principle of profitability and other market principles for communist economies.

In 1963 Ulbricht adapted Liberman's theories and introduced the New Economic System (NES), an economic reform program providing for some decentralization in decision-making and the consideration of market and performance criteria. The NES aimed at creating an efficient economic system and transforming the GDR into a leading industrial nation.

Under the NES, the task of establishing future economic development was assigned to central planning. Decentralization involved the partial transfer of decision-making authority from the central State Planning Commission and National Economic Council to the Associations of People's Enterprises (Vereinigungen Volkseigener Betriebe—VVB), parent organizations intended to promote specialization within the same areas of production. The central planning authorities set overall production goals, but each VVB determined its own internal financing, utilization of technology, and allocation of manpower and resources. As intermediary bodies, the VVBs also functioned to synthesize information and recommendations from the VEBs. The NES stipulated that production decisions be made on the basis of profitability, that salaries reflect performance, and that prices respond to supply and demand.

The NES brought forth a new elite in politics as well as in management of the economy, and in 1963 Ulbricht announced a new policy regarding admission to the leading ranks of the SED. Ulbricht opened the Politbüro and the Central Committee to younger members who had more education than their predecessors and who had acquired managerial and technical skills. As a consequence of the new policy, the SED elite became divided into political and economic factions, the latter composed of members of the new technocratic elite. Because of the emphasis on professionalization in the SED cadre policy after 1963, the composition of the mass membership changed: in 1967 about 250,000 members (14%) of the total 1.8 million SED membership had completed a course of study at a university, technical college, or trade school.

The SED emphasis on managerial and technical competence also enabled members of the technocratic elite to enter the top echelons of the state bureaucracy, formerly reserved for political dogmatists. Managers of the VVBs were chosen on the basis of professional training rather than ideological conformity. Within the individual enterprises, the number of professional positions and jobs for the technically skilled increased. The SED stressed education in managerial and technical sciences as the route to social advancement and material rewards. In addition, it promised to raise the standard of living for all citizens. From 1964 until 1967, real wages increased, and the supply of consumer goods, including luxury items, improved much.

The results of the reform, however, fell short of initial expectations, as growth was mostly the result of increased investment, rather than the new system of control. As a result, the reform plan was altered in 1967–1968, with the implementation of the "Economic System of Socialism". The ESS was implemented through so-called structure-determining areas, strategic sectors which enjoyed preferential access to funds and resources. Those initially included chemicals, engineering and electronics, but as enterprises lobbied the government for inclusion in the list of strategically important projects, the list grew ever longer.

Industrial combines partnerships were formed to integrate vertically industries involved in the manufacture of vital final products. Price subsidies were restored to accelerate growth in favored sectors. The annual plan for 1968 set production quotas in the structure-determining areas 2.6% higher than in the remaining sectors to achieve industrial growth in these areas. The state set the 1969–70 goals for high-technology sectors even higher. Failure to meet ESS goals resulted in the conclusive termination of the reform effort in 1970.

The Altmark gas field was discovered in the late 1960s, providing an important source of foreign currency for the country.

=== 1970s-1990 ===
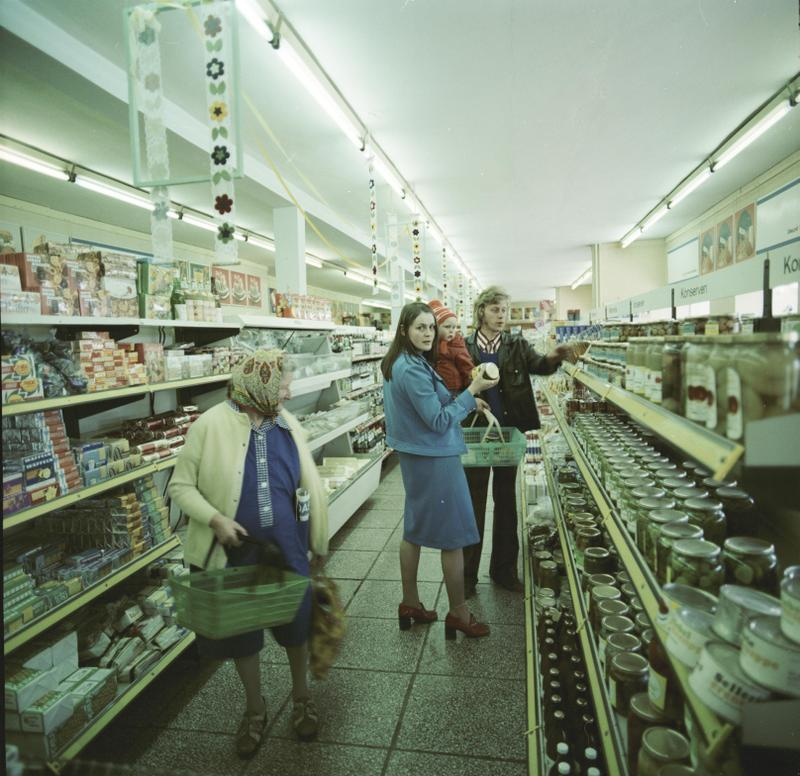
An East German shopping center, 1976

In the early 1970s, long-term, comprehensive planning began. It too provided general guidance, but over a longer period, fifteen or twenty years, long enough to link the five-year plans in a coherent manner.

The Main Task, introduced by First Secretary Erich Honecker in 1971, formulated domestic policy for the 1970s. The program re-emphasized Marxism-Leninism and the international class struggle. During this period, the SED launched a massive propaganda campaign to win citizens to its Soviet-style socialism and to restore the "worker" to prominence. The Main Task restated the economic goal of industrial progress, but this goal was to be achieved within the context of centralized state planning. Consumer socialism—the new program featured in the Main Task—was an effort to magnify the appeal of socialism by offering special consideration for the material needs of the working class. The state extensively revamped wage policy and gave more attention to increasing the availability of consumer goods.

The regime accelerated the construction of new housing and the renovation of existing apartments; 60% of new and renovated housing was allotted to working-class families. Rents, which were subsidized, remained extremely low. Because women constituted nearly 50% of the labor force, child-care facilities, including nurseries and kindergartens, were provided for the children of working mothers. Women in the labor force received salaried maternity leave which ranged from six months to one year. Retirement annuities were increased.

The last small and middle-sized private companies, which had hitherto operated semi-independently, were nationalized in 1972. Honecker proudly informed Leonid Brezhnev of this fact in 1973. In some cases, the owner of the company would continue as its director with a salary provided by the state, which bore no automatic resemblance to the operating efficiency of the enterprise. This was an unnecessary step and caused shortages of certain goods. The very enterprises which allowed some degree of initiative and response to the market and which contributed so largely to the economy as a whole, even earning desperately needed hard currency, became subject to central planning and controls and as stagnant as the rest of the economy. One such example was the toy manufacturer C.M. Breitung in Sonneberg in Thuringia which was independent till 1972 when it was taken over and renamed Plüti.

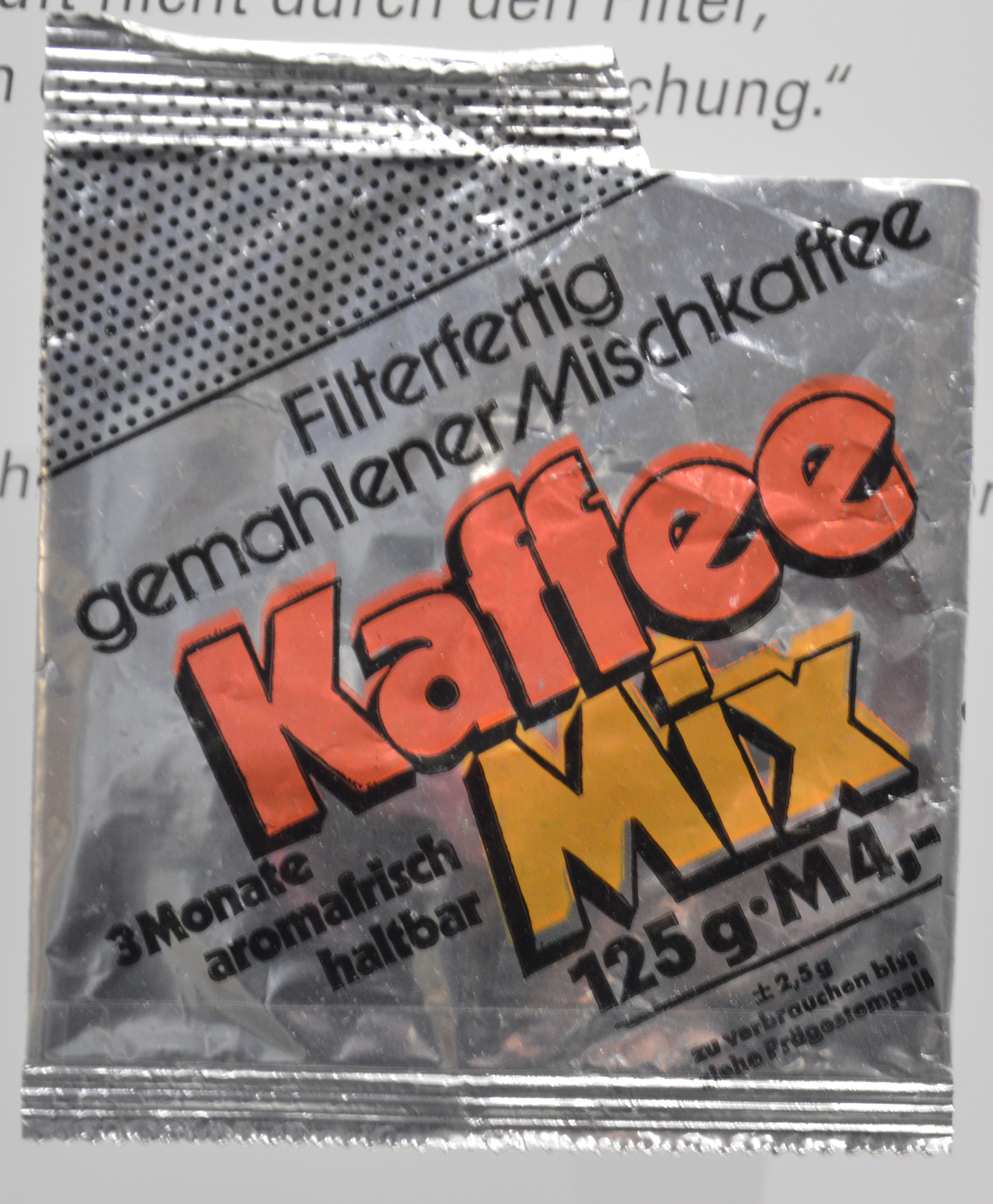
East German "coffee mix", containing 50% coffee, produced due to a lack of foreign currency reserves to purchase coffee beans on the world market

The global rise in commodity prices in the 1970s also affected East Germany, though later than elsewhere due to Comecon price controls. Due to the strong German tradition of drinking coffee, imports of this commodity were important for consumers. A massive rise in coffee prices in 1976–77 led to a quadrupling of the amount of hard currency needed to import coffee, an event known as the East German coffee crisis. This caused severe financial problems for the GDR, which perennially lacked sufficient hard currency to address imports from the West. As a result, in the summer of 1977 the Politbüro withdrew most cheaper brands of coffee from sale, limited the use of coffee in restaurants, and effectively withdrew its provision in public offices and state enterprises. In addition, an infamous new type of coffee was introduced, Mischkaffee (mixed coffee), which was 51% coffee and 49% a range of filler including chicory, rye, and sugar beet. Unsurprisingly, the new coffee was generally detested for its comparatively poor flavour, and the whole episode came to be informally known as the "Coffee Crisis." The crisis passed after 1978 as world coffee prices began to fall again, as well as increased supply through an agreement between the GDR and Vietnam.

The GDR's growing hard currency debts were a cause of domestic instability. After the Polish crisis of 1980-81, the West imposed a credit boycott on Eastern Bloc countries, including East Germany. The sale of Soviet crude oil, previously an important source of hard currency, became less profitable due to changes in the world economy. Soviet oil exports to the GDR were cut significantly in 1981, worsening the situation. A long period of underinvestment in research and capital goods made East German products uncompetitive on Western markets, leaving the country more reliant on the Soviet Union. The GDR faced insolvency in the early 1980s, but was able to delay bankruptcy through negotiating oil imports with the Soviet Union and export loans from France and Austria. A debt crisis was again averted through loans approved by West Germany in 1983 and 1984, in exchange for which the GDR agreed to loosen travel restrictions between the East and West.

The debt-to-GDP ratio reached 20% in 1989, a manageable level, but large in relation to the GDR's capacity to export sufficient goods to the West to provide the hard currency to service those debts. In October 1989 a paper prepared for the Politbüro (the Schürer-Papier, after its principal author) projected a need to increase export surplus from around 2 billion DM in 1990 to over 11 billion DM by 1995 to stabilize debt levels. It is doubtful whether such a Herculean effort could have succeeded without political turmoil, or indeed at all.

Much of the debt originated from attempts by the GDR to export its way out of its international debt problems, which required imports of components, technologies and raw materials; as well as attempts to maintain living standards through imports of consumer goods. The GDR was internationally competitive in some sectors such as mechanical engineering and printing technology.

A significant factor was also the elimination of a ready source of hard currency through re-export of Soviet oil, which until 1981 was provided below world market prices; the resulting loss of hard currency income produced a noticeable dip in the otherwise steady improvement of living standards. (It was precisely this continuous improvement which was at risk due to the impending debt crisis; the Schürer-Papier's remedial plans spoke of a 25–30% reduction.)

The fall of the Berlin Wall in November 1989 further worsened the economic situation by draining the workforce and making it harder for state enterprises to obtain supplies. The collapse of the central planning authority caused a fall in production, bringing about shortages which in turn led to increasing levels of emigration.

On 1 July 1990 the country entered a monetary and economic union with West Germany, followed by the political dissolution of East Germany on 3 October 1990.

=== Post-unification ===
The immediate aftermath of unification saw a period of economic collapse as industrial production plummeted and a rapid increase in the unemployment rate. In the early 1990s the kombinats were handed over to the Treuhandanstalt (Public Trustee), a German federal agency responsible for reprivatizing former government-owned industrial assets. Interest in East German businesses proved underwhelming, as West German firms had no need for the excess production capacity to supply the new federal states. One-third of the firms were ultimately liquidated, which, combined with layoffs in the surviving firms, resulted in a 60% cut in employment in the new states.

== Sectors of the economy ==
=== Agriculture ===
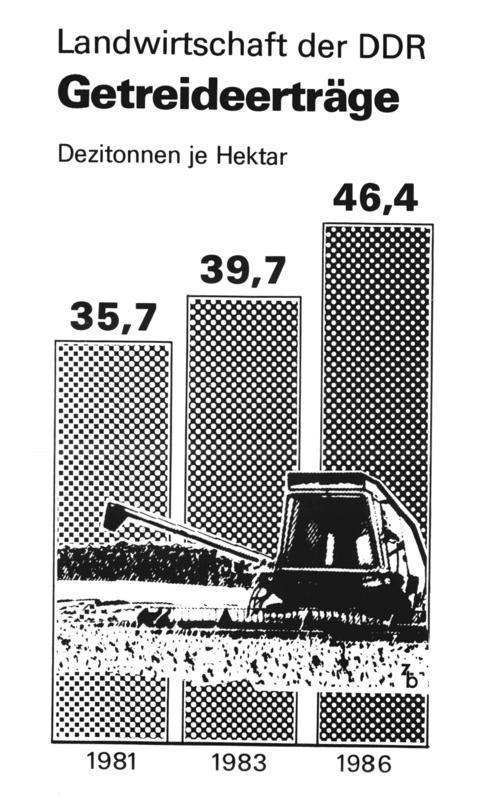
A 1987 propaganda poster showing increased agricultural production from 1981 to 1983 and 1986

The agricultural sector of the economy had a somewhat different place in the system, although it too was thoroughly integrated. It was almost entirely collectivized except for private plots. The collective farms were formally self-governing. They were, however, subordinate to the Council of Ministers through the Ministry of Agriculture, Forestry, and Foodstuffs. A complex set of relationships also connected them with other cooperatives and related industries, such as food processing. By 1 July 1954, there were 4,974 collective farms with 147,000 members which cultivated 15.7 per cent of the arable land of the territory.

=== Industry ===
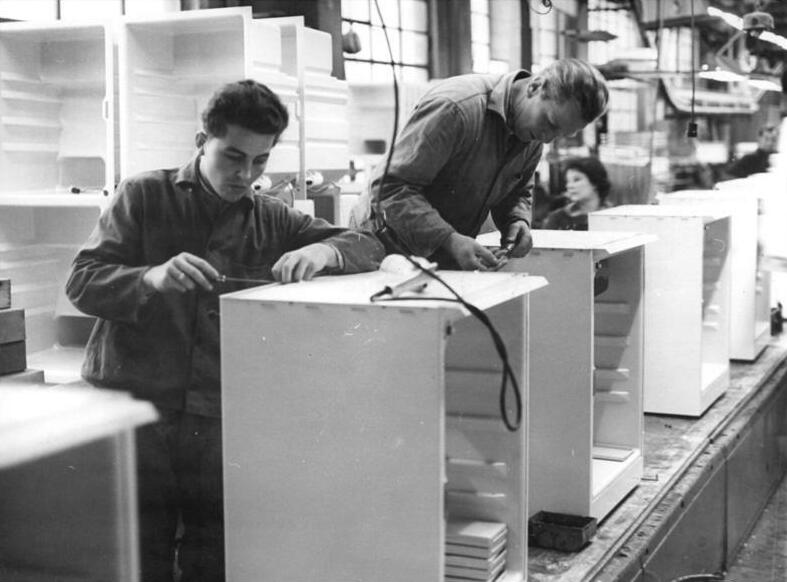
Two East German assembly line workers building refrigerators at VEB DKK Scharfenstein, 1964

On 1 January 1954, the Soviet government turned over to the GDR thirty-three industrial concerns including the Leuna and Buna chemical works, and the GDR became the owner of all the enterprises in its territory.

Directly below the ministries were the centrally directed trusts, or Kombinate. Intended to be replacements for the Associations of Publicly Owned Enterprises—the largely administrative organizations that previously served as a link between the ministries and the individual enterprises—the Kombinate resulted from the merging of various industrial enterprises into large-scale entities in the late-1970s, based on interrelationships between their production activities.

The Kombinate included research enterprises, which the state incorporated into their structures to provide better focus for research efforts and speedier application of research results to production. A single, united management directed the entire production process in each Kombinat, from research to production and sales. The reform also attempted to foster closer ties between the activities of the Kombinate and the foreign trade enterprises by subordinating the latter to both the Ministry of Foreign Trade and the Kombinate. The goal of the Kombinat reform measure was to achieve greater efficiency and rationality by concentrating authority in the hands of midlevel leadership. The Kombinat management also provided significant input for the central planning process.

By the early 1980s, establishment of Kombinate for both centrally managed and district-managed enterprises was essentially complete. Particularly from 1982 to 1984, the government established various regulations and laws to define more precisely the parameters of these entities. These provisions tended to reinforce the primacy of central planning and to limit the autonomy of the Kombinate, apparently to a greater extent than originally planned. As of early 1986, there were 132 centrally managed Kombinate, with an average of 25,000 employees per Kombinat. District-managed Kombinate numbered 93, with an average of about 2,000 employees each.

At the base of the entire economic structure were the producing units. Although these varied in size and responsibility, the government gradually reduced their number and increased their size. The number of industrial enterprises in 1985 was only slightly more than a fifth that of 1960. Their independence decreased significantly as the Kombinate became fully functional.

== Central leadership ==
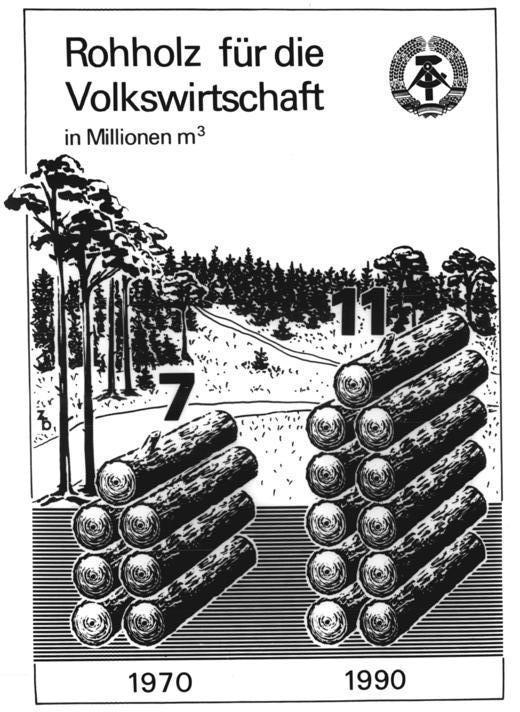
Timber production rose from 7 million cubic metres (250 million cubic feet) in 1970 to 11 million (390 million cubic feet) in 1990 (1988 propaganda poster).

=== Socialist Unity Party of Germany ===
The ultimate directing force in the economy, as in every aspect of the society, was the Socialist Unity Party of Germany (SED), particularly its top leadership. The party exercised its leadership role formally during the party congress, when it accepted the report of the general secretary, and when it adopted the draft plan for the upcoming five-year period.

More important was the supervision of the SED's Politbüro, which monitored and directed ongoing economic processes. That key group, however, could concern itself with no more than the general, fundamental, or extremely serious economic questions, because it also had to deal with many other matters.

=== Government bureaucracy ===
At the head of the state apparatus responsible for formally adopting and carrying out policies elaborated by the party congress and Politbüro was the Council of Ministers, which had more than forty members and was in turn headed by a Presidium of sixteen. The Council of Ministers supervised and coordinated the activities of all other central bodies responsible for the economy, and it played a direct and specific role in important cases.

The State Planning Commission, sometimes called the "Economic General Staff of the Council of Ministers," advised the Council of Ministers on possible alternative economic strategies and their implications, translated the general targets set by the council into planning directives and more specific plan targets for each of the ministries beneath it, coordinated short-, medium-, and long-range planning, and mediated interministerial disagreements.

The individual ministries had major responsibility for the detailed direction of the different sectors of the economy. The ministries were responsible within their separate spheres for detailed planning, resource allocation, development, implementation of innovations, and generally for the efficient achievement of their individual plans.

In addition to the basic structure of the industrial sector, a supplementary hierarchy of government organs reached down from the Council of Ministers and the State Planning Commission to territorial rather than functional subunits. Regional and local planning commissions and economic councils, subordinate to the State Planning Commission and the Council of Ministers, respectively, extended down to the local level. They considered such matters as the proper or optimal placement of industry, environmental protection, and housing.

== Central planning ==
The fact that the GDR had a planned economy did not mean that a single, comprehensive plan was the basis of all economic activity. An interlocking web of plans having varying degrees of specificity, comprehensiveness, and duration was in operation at all times; any or all of these may have been modified during the continuous process of performance monitoring or as a result of new and unforeseen circumstances. The resultant system of plans was extremely complex, and maintaining internal consistency between the various plans was a considerable task.

=== Short-term planning ===
Operationally, short-term planning was the most important for production and resource allocation. It covered one calendar year and encompassed the entire economy. The key targets set at the central level were overall rate of growth of the economy, volume and structure of the domestic product and its uses, use of raw materials and labor and their distribution by sector and region, and volume and structure of exports and imports. Beginning with the 1981 plan, the state added assessment of the ration of raw material use against value and quantity of output to promote more efficient use of scarce resources.

=== Five-year plans ===
Low-range (five-year) planning used the same indicators, although with less specificity. Although the five-year plan was duly enacted into law, it is more properly seen as a series of guidelines rather than as a set of direct orders. It was typically published several months after the start of the five-year period it covered, after the first one-year plan had been enacted into law. More general than a one-year plan, the five-year plan was nevertheless specific enough to integrate the yearly plans into a longer time frame. Thus it provided continuity and direction.

=== Planning mechanisms ===
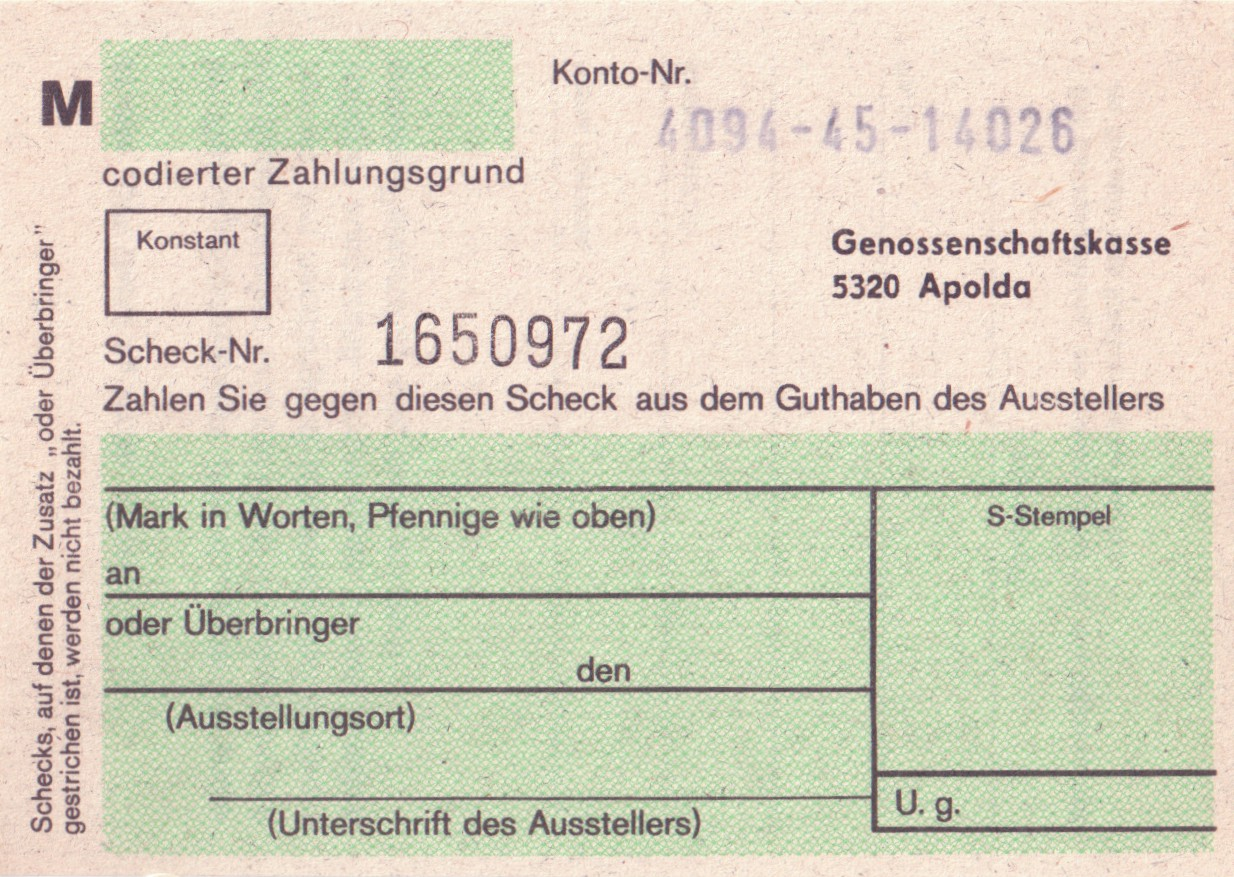
East German Cheque issued in 1988

In the first phase of planning, the centrally determined objectives were divided and assigned to appropriate subordinate units. After internal consideration and discussion had occurred at each level and suppliers and buyers had completed negotiations, the separate parts were reaggregated into draft plans. In the final stage, which follows the acceptance of the total package by the State Planning Commission and the Council of Ministers, the finished plan was redivided among the ministries, and the relevant responsibilities were distributed once more to the producing units.

The production plan was supplemented by other mechanisms that control supplies and establish monetary accountability. One such mechanism was the System of Material Balances, which allocated materials, equipment, and consumer goods. It acted as a rationing system, ensuring each element of the economy access to the basic goods it needed to fulfill its obligations. Since most of the goods produced by the economy were covered by this control mechanism, producing units had difficulty obtaining needed items over and above their allocated levels.

Another control mechanism was the assignment of prices for all goods and services. These prices served as a basis for calculating expenses and receipts. Enterprises had every incentive to use these prices as guidelines in decision-making. Doing so made plan fulfillment possible and earned bonus funds of various sorts for the enterprise. These bonuses were not allocated indiscriminately for gross output but were awarded for such accomplishments as the introduction of innovations or reduction of labor costs.

The system functioned smoothly only when its component parts were staffed with individuals whose values coincided with those of the regime or at least complemented regime values. Such a sharing took place in part through the integrative force of the party organs whose members occupied leading positions in the economic structure. Efforts were also made to promote a common sense of purpose through mass participation of almost all workers and farmers in organized discussion of economic planning, tasks, and performance. An East German journal reported, for example, that during preliminary discussion concerning the 1986 annual plan, 2.2 million employees in various enterprises and work brigades of the country at large contributed 735,377 suggestions and comments. Ultimate decision-making, however, came from above.

== Private sector ==
The private sector of the economy was small but not entirely insignificant. In 1985 about 2.8% of the net national product came from private enterprises. The private sector included private farmers and gardeners; independent craftsmen, wholesalers, and retailers; and individuals employed in so-called freelance activities (artists, writers, and others). Although self-employed, such individuals were strictly regulated. In 1985, for the first time in many years, the number of individuals working in the private sector increased slightly. According to East German statistics, in 1985 there were about 176,800 private entrepreneurs, an increase of about 500 over 1984. Certain private sector activities were quite important to the system. The SED leadership, for example, encouraged private initiative as part of an effort to upgrade consumer services.

In addition to those East Germans who were self-employed full-time, there were others who engaged in private economic activity on the side. The best known and most important examples were families on collective farms who also cultivated private plots (which could be as large as 53,820 ft^{2} (5,000 m^{2})). Their contribution was significant; according to official sources, in 1985 the farmers privately owned about 8.2% of pigs, 14.7% of sheep, 32.8% of horses, and 30% of laying hens in the country. Professionals such as commercial artists and doctors also worked privately in their free time, subject to separate taxes and other regulations. Their impact on the economic system, however, was negligible.

== Informal economy ==
More difficult to assess, because of its covert and informal nature, was the significance of that part of the private sector called the "second economy." As used here, the term includes all economic arrangements or activities that, owing to their informality or their illegality, took place beyond state control or surveillance. The subject has received considerable attention from Western economists, most of whom are convinced that it is important in CPEs. In the mid-1980s, however, evidence was difficult to obtain and tended to be anecdotal in nature.

These irregularities did not appear to constitute a major economic problem. However, the East German press occasionally reported prosecutions of egregious cases of illegal "second economy" activity, involving what are called "crimes against socialist property" and other activities that are in "conflict and contradiction with the interests and demands of society", as one report described the situation.

=== Barter economy ===
One kind of informal economic activity included private arrangements to provide goods or services in return for payment. An elderly woman might have hired a neighbour boy to haul coal up to her apartment, or an employed woman might have paid a neighbour to do her washing. Closely related would be instances of hiring an acquaintance to repair a clock, tune up an automobile, or repair a toilet. Such arrangements take place in any society, and given the deficiencies in the East German service sector, they may have been more necessary than in the West. They were doubtlessly common, and because they were considered harmless, they were not the subject of any significant governmental concern. Scarce goods from Westpakete were also highly desired for barter.

== Corruption ==
Another common activity that was troublesome if not disruptive was the practice of offering a sum of money beyond the selling price to individuals selling desirable goods, or giving something special as partial payment for products in short supply, the so-called Bückware (duck goods; sold from "below the counter"). Such ventures may have been no more than offering someone Trinkgeld (a tip), but they may have also involved Schmiergeld (bribes; lit. money used to "grease" a transaction) or Beziehungen (special relationships).

Opinions in East Germany varied as to how significant these practices were. But given the abundance of money in circulation and frequent shortages in luxury items and durable consumer goods, most people were perhaps occasionally tempted to provide a "sweetener", particularly for such things as automobile parts or furniture.

== Comparison with West Germany ==
GDP, Population, and GDP per capita comparison between East and West Germany
| | East Germany | | | West Germany | | | |
| | GDP (1990 Int$, millions) | Population (thousands) | GDP per capita ($) | GDP (1990 Int$, millions) | Population (thousands) | GDP per capita ($) | East as a % of West |
| 1950 | 51,412 | 18,400 | 2,794 | 213,942 | 50,000 | 4,279 | 65 |
| 1990/1989 (Note: GDP data is from 1990 and population data is from 1989. While the measure isn't year for year, it's still going to give us a rough GDP per capita figure between 1989 and 1990 suitable for the purposes of this table.) | 160,000 | 16,400 | 9,679 | 1,182,261 | 62,100 | 19,038 | 51 |
Angus Maddison Data
| 1936 | 74,652 | 15,614 | 4,781.09 | 192,911 | 42,208 | 4,570.48 | 105 |
| 1950 | 51,412 | 18,388 | 2,795.95 | 213,942 | 49,983 | 4,280.30 | 65 |
| 1973 | 129,969 | 16,890 | 7,695.03 | 814,786 | 61,976 | 13,146.80 | 59 |
| 1990 | 82,177 | 16,111 | 5,100.68 | 1,182,281 | 63,254 | 18,690.69 | 27 |
| 1991 | 85,961 | 15,910 | 5,402.95 | 1,242,096 | 63,889 | 19,441.47 | 28 |

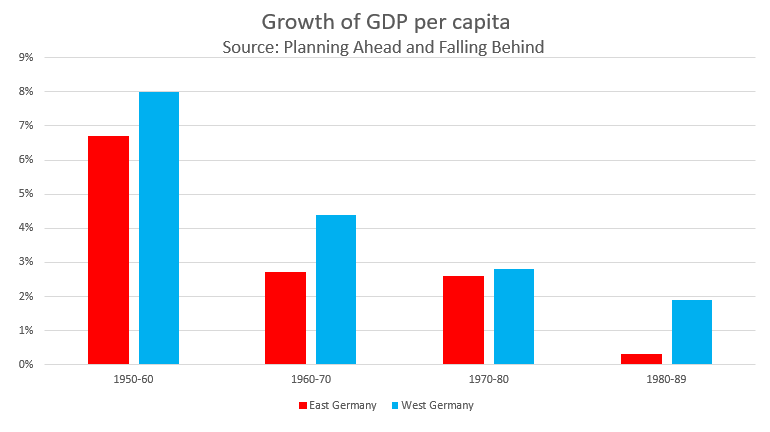
Growth GDP per capita East Germany

East German growth rates of GDP according to different series
| | East Germany | | | West Germany |
| | Sleifer (2006) | Merkel and Wahl (1991) | Maddison (1995) | ICOP |
| 1950-1960 | 6.7 | 3.6 | 5.5 | 8.0 |
| 1960-1970 | 2.7 | 2.5 | 2.9 | 4.4 |
| 1970-1980 | 2.6 | 2.5 | 2.8 | 2.8 |
| 1980-1989 | 0.3 | 0.5 | 1.6 | 1.9 |
| 1950-1989 | 3.1 | 2.3 | 3.3 | 4.3 |

1990 CIA World Factbook data
| | East Germany | West Germany |
|---|---|---|
| Population (thousands) | 16,307 | 62,168 |
| GNP/GDP ($ billion) (Note: GNP, used for the GDR, includes income earned by its citizens abroad, minus income earned by foreigners from domestic production. GDP, used for the Federal Republic of (West) Germany, is not so modified. So, the two figures are not strictly comparable, and they differ significantly from previously listed data.) | 159.5 | 945.7 |
| GNP/GDP per capita ($) | 9,679 | 15,300 |
| Budget revenues ($ billion) | 123.5 | 539 |
| Budget expenditures ($ billion) | 123.2 | 563 |

== See also ==
- New Course
- Volkseigener Betrieb
- Volkseigenes Gut
- Electronics industry in East Germany

== Sources ==
- Berghoff, Hartmut; Balbier, Uta Andrea (2013). The East German economy, 1945-2010: falling behind or catching up?. Cambridge University Press. ISBN 978-1-107-03013-8.
- Library of Congress
