= Agriculture in East Germany =

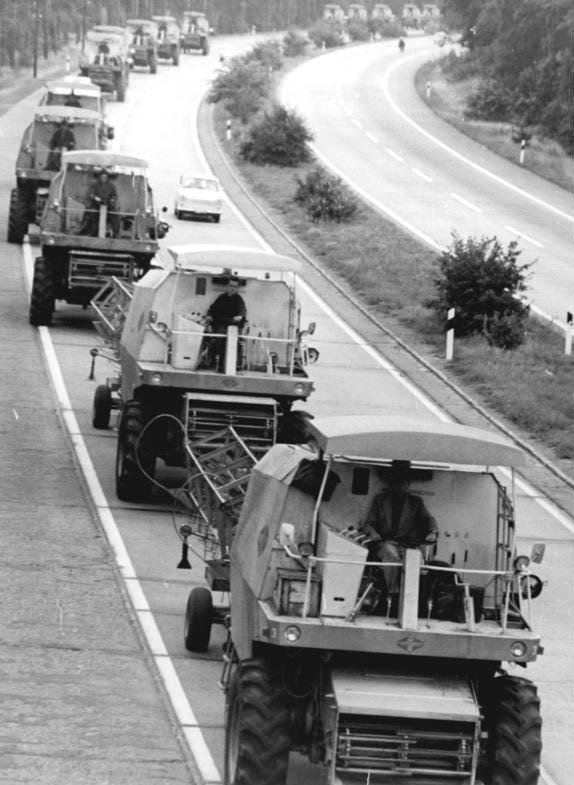
E 512 combine harvesters on an East German motorway

This article describes the development of agriculture in East Germany, both the Soviet occupation zone of Germany as well as the German Democratic Republic (GDR) between the years 1945 and 1990.

The agricultural policy in the GDR occurred in three phases. The first of which was the so-called Bodenreform ("land reform"), where around 40% of the land used for cultivation was expropriated and redistributed without compensation. In 1952 the second phase of collectivization coincided with the abolition of privately owned and run farms. As early as the 1960s the third phase of specialization and industrialization began, in which the GDR leadership tried unsuccessfully to demonstrate the superiority of socialism through forced collectivization and economic structures which originated in opposition of the so-called capitalist foreign countries.

During the 1970s and early 1980s, the trend in East German agriculture was toward larger units; some crop-producing collectives and state-owned farms combined to create Agricultural Cooperatives holding up to 4,000 or 5,000 hectares. These agribusinesses, known as Cooperative Departments of Crop Production ("Kooperative Abteilung Pflanzenproduktion" – KAP ), which included food-processing establishments, became the dominant form of agricultural enterprise in crop production. In the early 1980s, specialization also increased to include livestock production.

In 1985, East German agriculture employed 10.8 percent of the labor force, received 7.4 percent of gross capital investments, and contributed 8.1 percent to the country's net product. Farms were usually organized either in state-owned farms ("Volkseigenes Gut") or collective farms ("Landwirtschaftliche Produktionsgenossenschaften").

== Development phases in chronological order ==
=== First phase: expropriation of land and redistribution to new farmers ===
==== Preliminary planning ====
After the Casablanca conference, a twenty-person working committee of the central committee of the Communist Party of Germany (KPD) was formed with members of the National Committee for a Free Germany in Moscow on February 6, 1944. Working closely with Soviet authorities, the working committee composed the "action program of the bloc of militant democracy", in which goals such as the eradication of the National Socialist legacy, the creation food security, and the creation of an alliance between the workforce and "working" farmers were formulated for further the development of agriculture and rural areas. The action program called for land reform without addressing the circumstances. The KPD leadership was most experienced in urban environments and, due to their origins, wasn't able to precisely makes plans for agriculture and therefore limited themselves to applying Marxist theories. The concrete plans simply remained that small farmers were "natural allies" and landowners as undesirable. Edwin Hoernle was one of the few members in the KPD with any agricultural expertise and had warned Moscow of the economic consequences, however the expropriations persisted despite this.

==== Circumstances and data ====
During and directly after World War II the state administrations and the citizens they governed needed to manage scarce resources, and in particular food produced from agriculture. The economy of Germany was based on Soviet planned economy, which regulated production and consumption via food cards and fixed prices.

In the Soviet occupation zone, a total of 9,050 farms with an area of over 100 hectares were potential candidates to be expropriated. There were around 1.5% of farms, which cultivated 28.3 percent of the usable agricultural area, and in 1949, 7,079 of these farms, most of which had previously been privately owned, were expropriated. Around 34% of the total usable agricultural area was confiscated. 210,259 new farmer positions were created by the end of 1950. The goal of Moscow's structural changes in regards to agriculture, with the creation of a new social group, was realized, in so far as these new small farmers were natural allies of the party (in the opinion of the KPD leadership).

The spontaneous uprising hoped for by the KPD, with wild expropriations by local groups, did not materialize despite attempts to artificially stage it. The Soviet dictator Josef Stalin personally ordered the expropriation of all farms above the arbitrary limit of 100 hectares.

==== Consequences ====
On the onset of the redistributions, many beneficiaries did not want to accept the land offered for them to cultivate, especially from farms whose owners they knew personally. Many serious problems arose from the fact that neither the Soviet occupying force nor the German communists could provide sufficient means of production (seeds, fertilizer, or animals) for the new farmers to work the land to the extent that was necessary. In fact, many new farmers even lacked houses or stables. There was planned to be 37,000 new houses built by the end of 1948, of which 748 were completed fully. As a result of the many problems, more than a third of all new farmers had left their farms before forced collectivization was implemented. Someone to replace those who left could only be found in just under a tenth of cases. By April 1952, 235,000 hectares were either not or merely insufficiently farmed in the Soviet occupation zone.

=== Second phase: collectivization and creation of Agricultural Cooperatives ===
==== Preliminary conditions ====
By the end of 1948, the collectivization of farms and agricultural organizations began all throughout the Eastern European economic area. The "class struggle" was to be promoted in the countryside alongside its normal home of factories and cities. Specifically, remaining farms over 20 hectares, pre-war agricultural organizations; such as breeding associations or Raiffeisen, and any remaining bourgeois officials or scientists were declared opponents of the regime. Immediately after the end of the war, larger farms were much more economically successful than the smaller new farmers, due to the established infrastructure and technology that was available to them. Additionally, most larger farms had managers who had learned the trade and had the necessary knowledge to run their farms. Although the state benefited from the larger farms, due to their high delivery rates, beginning in 1946 they were declared class enemies and massively disadvantaged, compared to the new farmers, who were often barely able to generate their own needs. From January 1, 1949, new laws were passed in quick succession that required farms over 20 hectares to supply operating resources and machines. In 1952, farms over 20 hectares had a delivery quota almost three times larger than that of the small new farmers. Pre-war agricultural organizations, especially Raiffeisen, in which most leading positions were held by successful farmers, were abolished from 1949 onwards. This and other attempts were also made to socially exclude larger farmers. In the newly founded Peasants Mutual Aid Association (VdgB) and the Democratic Farmers' Party of Germany (DBD), only loyal party members of the Socialist Unity Party of Germany (SED) were appointed to leadership positions.

The goal was to persuade larger farms to give up and surrender their land. To this end, farmers were punished for failing to comply with the high delivery rates. Government purchase prices were below production costs and larger farms were deliberately driven into economic ruin. Plant managers were arrested and the factories confiscated in many cases. All of this was not without consequences regarding the cultivation of the land, as between 1950 and 1952 alone, over 5,000 farming families fled to the Federal Republic of Germany and as a result more than 10% of the large farms were no longer operational.

==== Implementation ====
Beginning in April 1952, from Moscow, Josef Stalin called for a definitive demarcation with the West in the GDR, as well as closing the borders and building an army of their own. Also suggested was the establishment of Agricultural Cooperatives. Stalin had set the deadline for the autumn that same year and expressed his aversion to coercive implementation measures, and instead suggested the creation organizations from which an organic movement could emerge.

Those who joined the cooperatives were almost exclusively the unsuccessful new farmers. The cooperatives founded within the first few weeks in June and July 1952 therefore consisted out of the voluntarily self-interest of those farms with a genuine desire for cooperation. The problems with the policy of no coercion became apparent, when almost solely the economically weak farms joined together to form cooperatives, while the vast majority of farmers refused to join. Due to this the newly founded cooperatives were hardly economically viable compared to the remaining farms.

The SED reacted by increasing the pressure on the farmers who did not want to join. Chairmen of cooperatives were armed, farmers were imprisoned, show trials were held in villages, delivery obligations were arbitrarily increased, and more and more farmers were expropriated. For example, at a point around 6,500 farmers were expropriated within five weeks. To these ends the Stasi were in near constant use. Another consequence of collectivization was the flight of thousands of farmers to the West. The attempted replacement of the labor force by industrial workers and even by prisoners was unsuccessful. In some villages it was said that "the people were gone, but the business would still be there".

After Stalin's death in March 1953, Moscow leadership ordered to stop collectivization. The GDR leadership only formally obeyed and in reality continued the compulsory formation and expansion of cooperatives, which further increased the problems within the GDR. During the entire winter of 1952-53 there was food supply difficulties, the SED even withdrew food cards from two million citizens.

In early June 1953, the SED leadership was ordered to Moscow. There they had to admit mistakes and implement a change of course in policy. The rural population took this as an admission of the incompetence, and leading up to the unrest in big cities, there was resistance in the villages against their local SED functionaries.

Throughout the year of 1956, de-Stalinization was occurring throughout the Soviet bloc, and in the GDR, intellectual discussions about the ultimate fate of collectivization were held. The "New Agricultural Programme for the Development of Agriculture in the Building of Socialism in the GDR" by Kurt Vieweg was presented in October 1956, and came to prominence with the rural population because its author was a specialist with agricultural-centered economic knowledge. One such observation of Vieweg was that individual farmers and cooperatives would coexist in the long term, but he assumed in favor of the superiority of the cooperatives. However they should only be introduced across the board after they were proved in their superiority, not before.

At the fifth party congress in July 1958, the SED decided to go ahead with forced collectivization and to complete it by 1965. It was determined that complete collectivization would solve all the problems. At the end of 1959, 45.1% of the agricultural area was under a cooperative, and there were no longer any individual farmers in 365 villages. By 1960 84.1% was under a cooperative or state-owned farm. This massive procurement was achieved by forming groups of loyal workers, students, and proletariat, which were sent to the farmers to "convince" them. These "advertisers" used methods such as smashing windows, breaking in doors, or psychological torment with loudspeaker-vans around the clock, among other things. Any farmers who resisted these methods, had to expect to be humiliated and imprisoned as a class enemy and provocateur. Many farming families saw the only way out of this by being forced to join, to destroy their farms by arson, or to even commit suicide.

==== Direct consequences ====
The production numbers were far lower in all categories; 29 million tons less meat had been produced than planned, there was no fresh fruit at all, there was almost no fresh vegetables in shops, the need for legumes was only covered by 60% to 70% percent, and the canned food only consisted of pumpkin or plums.

While the origin of the lack of success can be attributed to excessive administration and many individual functionaries' addiction to image, other problems were systematic and affected the overall organization of agricultural policy. There were also permanent bureaucratic bottlenecks in operating resources for farms, leading to a lack of fuel and spare parts for the machines, and a lower number of animals on most farms for the area.

However the biggest problem by far was the unwillingness of members who were forced to join to contribute to the cooperatives' success. Many adopted a “work-slowly ideology” or merely worked the 0.5-hectare (1.2-acre) plot everyone received for "personal housekeeping".

In 1960, 10,233 farmers fled from the GDR, and in the first quarter of 1961, the year the Berlin Wall was built, another 2,401 did so as well.

When the wall was built there were no protests, because a lot of those who were not or could not be content in the GDR had already left earlier. A Stasi officer wrote: “Regarding the security measures in Berlin, it is to be said that this had a very favorable effect. You don't hear anyone nagging anymore, and everyone tries to help."

=== Third phase: specialization and "industrialization" ===
After collectivization was achieved, a phase of industrialization occurred to bring rural work more in line with industry. In order to improve the efficiency of the cooperatives, in 1973 they were separated into plant-based agriculture and animal husbandry. The intended effects were not achieved, and on the contrary, there was competition between the plant-based agriculture and animal husbandry cooperatives for scarce resources such as labor. The animal husbandry cooperatives saw little need to properly store farm manure, and the plant-based agriculture cooperatives were not required to produce high-quality feed for animals.
