= History of Eastern Germany =

History of Eastern Germany may refer to:

- History of the German Democratic Republic
- History of eastern German regions:
  - Prussia
  - East Prussia
  - West Prussia
  - Silesia
  - East Brandenburg
  - Pomerania
  - Province of Posen
