= Verlag Technik =

German publishing house

- Genre: technology, natural sciences
- Founded: 1964
- Defunct: 2013
- Fate: bought in 1991
- Successor: Huss-Medien GmbH
- Headquarters: Berlin
- Key people: Klaus Zweiling, Wolfgang Huss
- Website: http://www.verlag-technik.de/ (forwarding to http://www.huss-shop.de/cat)

Verlag Technik (abbr. VT, formerly VEB Verlag Technik, which temporarily operated as Verlag Technik GmbH) based in Berlin today is the remaining part of its incorporation into the Huss-Medien GmbH.

== History ==
The VEB Verlag Technik in Berlin was a specialist book and specialist journal publisher in the former German Democratic Republic (GDR). It was founded on 1 July 1946 and was a Volkseigener Betrieb (VEB) (English, "publicly owned enterprise"). Besides the Fachbuchverlag Leipzig it was one of the most important publishers of specialist books in the field of technology and natural sciences in the GDR up to and including the years immediately after the Wende in the reunified Germany, after which the number of new publications by Verlag Technik decreased significantly.

During its East German years it also published many trade journals for various technical fields, e.g. Radio Fernsehen Elektronik (Radio television electronics), MP Mikroprozessortechnik (MP microprocessor technology), Neue Technik im Büro (New technology in the office), Agrartechnik (Agricultural engineering), Kraftfahrzeugtechnik: Technische Zeitschrift des Kraftfahrwesens (KFT) or Die Technik: technisch-wissenschaftliche Zeitschrift für Grundsatz- und Querschnittsfragen (Technology - technical-scientific journal for basic and cross-sectional questions) (1950–1953).

During the early years of the publishing house, the physicist and philosopher Klaus Zweiling managed the publishing house from 1950 to 1955. A campaign for "pest work in the field of ideology" was initiated against him during this time. Rehabilitated in 1955, he was appointed full professor for dialectical materialism at the Humboldt University of Berlin.

In the course of the German reunification, VEB Verlag Technik was converted into a GmbH on 1 July 1990, of which the Treuhandanstalt was a 100% shareholder. In September 1991, the Munich publisher Wolfgang Huss bought the ReWi Verlag, a publishing house for law and economics (formerly a state publishing house), the publisher Die Wirtschaft, the Verlag für Bauwesen (a publishing house for building and construction) as well as Verlag Technik. Only 31 of the one-hundred employees of Verlag Technik were taken over.

Initially, Verlag Technik retained its legal form as a GmbH and became a subsidiary of Huss-Medien GmbH in Berlin, but it lost its independent, formal legal existence on 1 January 1999 when it was integrated into Huss-Medien GmbH. This also ended the membership of Verlag Technik in the Börsenverein des Deutschen Buchhandels (German Book Trade Association). The book trade ID number used up to that point was transferred to Huss-Medien GmbH.

== Publishing program ==
A small number of popular books and magazines, such as Elektropraktiker or Hebezeuge Fördermittel are still published up to today. However, the former journal Messen, Steuern, Regeln (MSR) was integrated into the journals Automatisierungstechnische Praxis and Automatisierungstechnik of the R. Oldenbourg Verlag, Munich.

=== Book series ===
The following series were published in the firm's East German period:

- Automatisierungstechnik
- Lehrbücher für die Berufsausbildung
- Lehrbücher für die Berufsbildung
- Schriftenreihe des Verlages Technik
