= Volkseigener Betrieb =

Former main legal form of industrial enterprise in East Germany

Full logo of the VEB

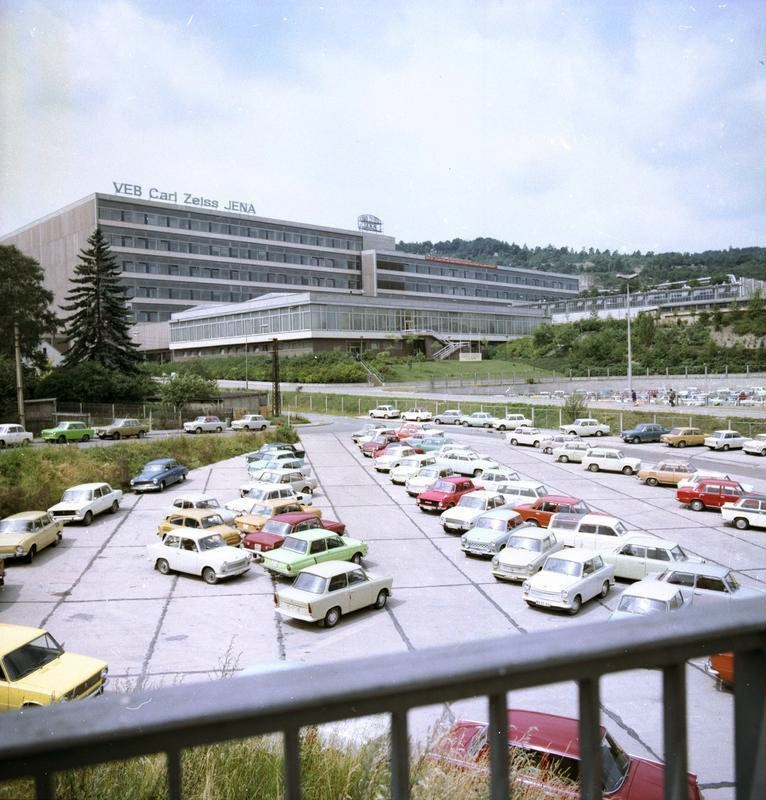
VEB Carl Zeiss Jena facility in 1978

Volkseigener Betrieb (VEB; German for "Publicly Owned Enterprise") was the main legal form for state-owned enterprises in the planned economy of the German Democratic Republic (East Germany). VEBs constituted the majority of the economy of East Germany, including most industrial and service enterprises, and employed 79.9% of the East German workforce by 1989.

VEBs were organised by the State Planning Commission of the Council of Ministers, first into vertically integrated units called Associations of Publicly Owned Enterprises Vereinigung Volkseigener Betriebe (VVBs) until these were reformed into Kombinat by the 1980s. Production and investment were set by the State Planning Commission and ministry industries under the control of the Socialist Unity Party of Germany. VEBs struggled to compete in the market economy during German reunification due to outdated and labour intensive practices, which made many of them unprofitable and heavily in debt. Around 8,000 VEBs were transferred to the Treuhandanstalt for privatisation and most were liquidated from 1990 to 1994.

== Organisation ==
VEBs first appeared during mass nationalisation in the Soviet occupation zone between 1945 and the early 1960s, and the handing back in 1954 of some 33 enterprises previously taken by the Soviet Union as war reparations for World War II

Each VEB was led by a plant or works manager (German: Werksleiter, Werksdirektor or Betriebsdirektor), assisted by the first secretary of the Socialist Unity Party of Germany factory organisation (Betriebsparteiorganisation) and the chairman of the factory trade union (Betriebsgewerkschaftsleitung). Subordinate to them were roles such as "Chief Accountant" and "Technical Director".

VEBs often had company sports teams, and played an important role in the promotion of sports.

An honorary name was frequently added to the firm's actual name, for example, VEB Kombinat Chemische Werke "Walter Ulbricht" Leuna. This was a socialist emulation incentive towards fulfillment and overfulfillment of production quotas. Many Germans, as a form of mild protest against the nationalization of private businesses, nicknamed the VEBs Vatis ehemaliger Betrieb, which translates to "Daddy's former business".

== Examples ==
- VEB Automobilwerk Eisenach
- VEB BMK Kohle und Energie
- VEB Braunkohlenwerk Gustav Sobottka Röblingen
- VEB Deutsche Musikaliendruckerei
- VEB Deutsche Schallplatten
- VEB Deutsche Seereederei Rostock
- VEB Elbewerften Boizenburg/Roßlau
- VEB Fachbuchverlag Leipzig
- VEB Fahrzeug- und Gerätewerk Simson Suhl
- VEB Fernmelde-Anlagenbau Dresden
- VEB Filmfabrik Wolfen
- Hochseeschiffbau Mathias-Thesen-Werft Wismar VEB
- VEB Jehmlich Orgelbau Dresden
- VEB Lokomotivbau Karl Marx Babelsberg (LKM)
- VEB Lokomotivbau Elektrotechnische Werke Hans Beimler Hennigsdorf (LEW)
- VEB Meissen Porzellan
- VEB Motorradwerk Zschopau
- VEB Polytechnik
- VEB Planeta
- VEB Robotron
- VEB Sachsenring Automobilwerke Zwickau
- VEB Typoart
- VEB Uhrenwerke Ruhla
- VEB Verlag Technik
- VEB Volkswerft (Stralsund)
- Kombinat VEB Zeiss Jena

== See also ==
- Volkseigenes Gut
- Landwirtschaftliche Produktionsgenossenschaft
- New Economic System
- Economy of East Germany

== Sources ==
- Pilleul-Arp, Agnès (2005). ""VEB-GmbH": "Vatis ehemaliger Betrieb — geklaut mit besonderer Höflichkeit". Klein- und Mittelunternehmer in der DDR: Lebensläufe zwischen 1949 und 1990 im Vergleich" ["Father's old business - very politely stolen". Small and mid-sized entrepreneurs in East Germany: comparative life stories from 1949 until 1990]. Historical Social Research (in German). 30 (2 (112), "Entrepreneurs and Managers in Socialism"). Köln, Germany: GESIS - Leibniz-Institute for the Social Sciences, Center for Historical Social Research: 160–180. JSTOR 20762038.
- Hinterthür, Bettina (2006). "Die Trennung von Verlag und Druckerei und die Folgen im Musikverlag" [The separation of publisher and printer and the consequences for music publication]. Noten nach Plan: die Musikverlage in der SBZ/DDR – Zensursystem, zentrale Planwirtschaft und deutsch-deutsche Beziehungen bis Anfang der 1960er Jahre. Beiträge zur Unternehmensgeschichte (in German). Vol. 23. Stuttgart: Franz Steiner Verlag. pp. 302–307. ISBN 9783515088374. ISSN 1433-8645.
