= Altmark gas field =

Gas field in Saxony-Anhalt, Germany

Altmark
- Country: Germany
- Region: Saxony-Anhalt
- Offshore/onshore: onshore
- Operator: GDF Suez

Field history
- Discovery: 1968
- Start of production: 1969

Production
- Current production of gas: 1.37×10^{6} m^{3}/d 48×10^{6} cu ft/d 0.5×10^{9} m^{3}/a (18×10^{9} cu ft/a)
- Estimated gas in place: 260×10^{9} m^{3} 9.1×10^{12} cu ft

The Altmark gas field is a natural gas field located in Saxony-Anhalt. It was discovered in 1968 and developed by EEG (Erdöl Erdgas Gommern), today Neptune Energy Deutschland GmbH. It began production in 1969 and produces natural gas and condensates. The total proven reserves of the Altmark gas field are around 9.1 trillion cu ft (260 billion m^{3}), and daily production is slated to be around 48 million cu ft (1.4 million m^{3}).
