= Volkseigenes Gut =

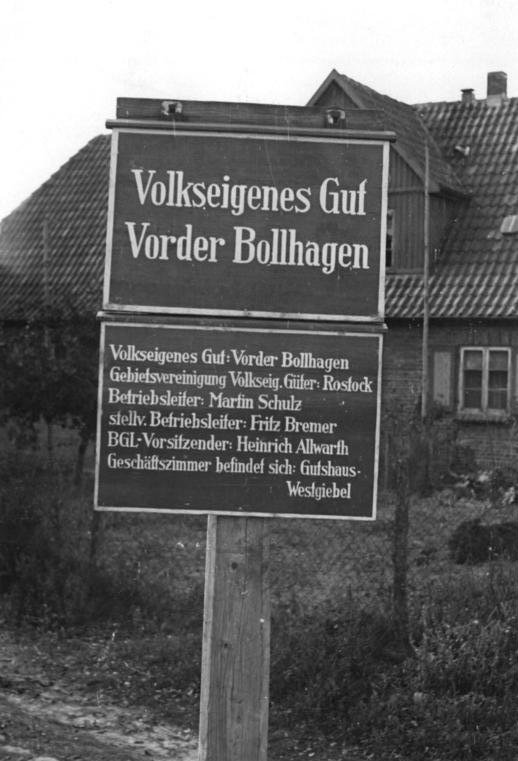
Entrance to VEG Vorder Bollhagen

The Volkseigenes Gut (German for 'People-Owned Property' or 'Publicly Owned Estate'; abbreviated VEG) was a state-owned farm in the German Democratic Republic (GDR), corresponding to the Soviet Sovkhoz and the Państwowe Gospodarstwo Rolne in the People's Republic of Poland. In contrast to the Landwirtschaftliche Produktionsgenossenschaft (LPG) or collective farm, another form of state agricultural enterprise, the VEGs were often the successors to former private farms which resulted from the land reform in the Soviet sector of Germany mandated in the Potsdam Agreement of 1945.

Each VEG was directly integrated into national economic planning. They were either central (formulated by the national government) or subordinated to the district (Bezirk).

A Volkseigenes Gut was state property and the agricultural counterpart to the state-owned enterprise, in the GDR Volkseigener Betrieb. They were run by a director according to the principle of individual management. Unlike the LPG, the workers employed on a VEG had no say in running it.

Initially, the VEGs predominantly raised animals and plants and propagated seed to supply LPGs.

In 1960, the approximately 690 VEGs had under cultivation approximately 6.3 percent of the available agricultural land in the GDR. However, in the course of the general concentration and specialisation in agriculture, by 1980 their number had fallen to 385.

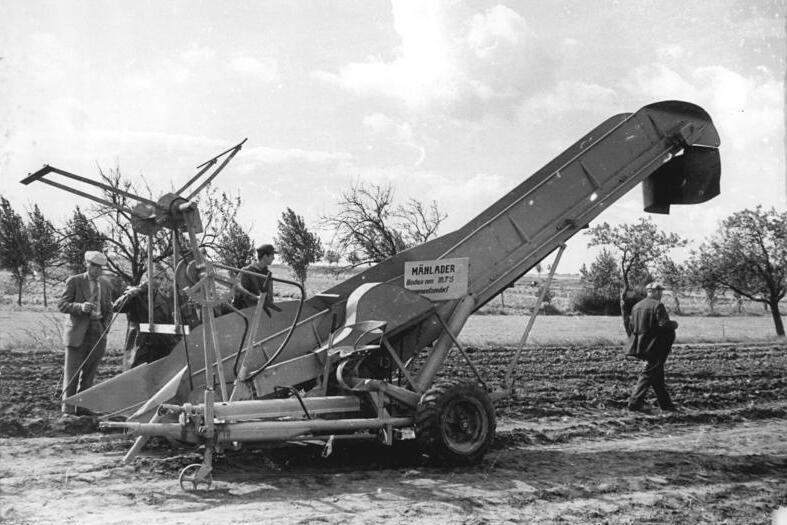
VEG Schwaneberg, presentation of a combine harvester, September 1957

As with the LPGs, so with the VEGs, in the late 1960s, a politically motivated separation of animal husbandry from arable farming was instituted. The VEB-P (for Pflanzenproduktion, 'plant production') and VEB-T (for Tierproduktion, 'animal production') classifications arose. However, these were simultaneously amalgamated into larger units, so that their total numbers declined from 511 in 1970 to 465 in 1985, while the agricultural land under cultivation by the VEGs remained almost constant at approximately 440,000 hectares (1,100,000 acres).

Compared to the LPGs, in many cases the VEGs received preferential treatment, in the form of superior machinery and more capital investment, since they functioned as so-called pillars of the preferred working class on the land. In particular in the 1950s and 1960s, they were expected to demonstrate the superiority of the "socialist model of production", and later also to take on a progressive role, which, however, they were not always able to perform adequately.

After Germany was reunified in 1990, the assets of the VEGs were transferred to the government by the Treuhandanstalt.

== See also ==
- Sovkhoz, or Soviet farm, a state-owned farm in the Soviet Union and some post-Soviet states
- State Agricultural Farm, a form of collective farming in Polish People's Republic

== Sources ==
- Klaus Schmidt (ed.). Landwirtschaft in der DDR – VEG, LPG und Kooperationen; wie sie wurden, was sie waren, was aus ihnen geworden ist. Clenze: Agrimedia, 2009
- Arnd Bauerkämper. Ländliche Gesellschaft in der kommunistischen Diktatur – Zwangsmodernisierung und Tradition in Brandenburg 1945–1963. Cologne: Böhlau, 2002, ISBN 3-412-16101-2
- Ilona Buchsteiner. "Bodenreform und Agrarwirtschaft der DDR. Forschungsstudie". In Zur Arbeit der Enquetekommission "Leben in der DDR, Leben nach 1989 – Aufarbeitung und Versöhnung", volume V Schwerin: Landtag Mecklenburg-Vorpommern, 1997, ISBN 3-932447-00-X, pp. 9–61
- Jens Schöne. Frühling auf dem Lande? – Die Kollektivierung der DDR-Landwirtschaft. Berlin: Links, 2005, ISBN 3-86153-360-X
