= Main Task =

Economic policy

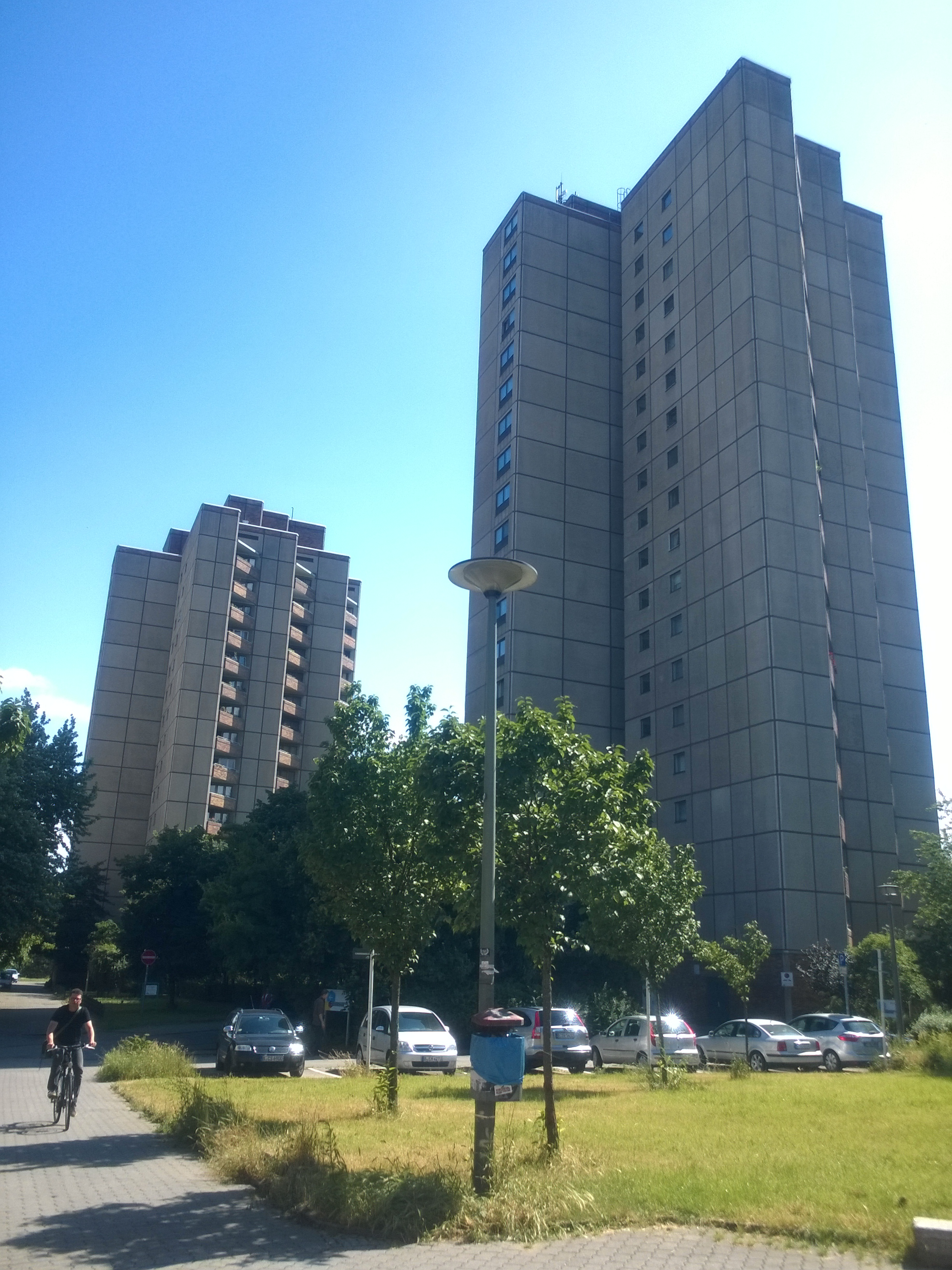
Plattenbau tower blocks in Prenzlauer Berg, Berlin. Large quantities of prefabricated housing were built as part of the Main Task policy.

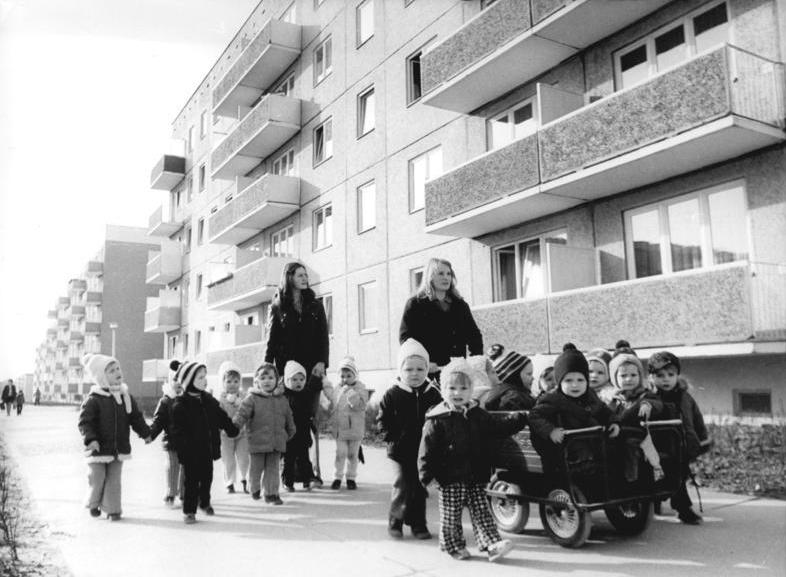
Kindergarten children in Neubrandenburg in 1974. The Main Task policy increased funding of kindergartens as part of the expanded welfare state.

Main Task (German: Hauptaufgabe) was the economic policy of the German Democratic Republic (East Germany) under Erich Honecker from 1971 to 1990. It aimed at improving the standard of living to match West Germany through the increased spending on subsidies, welfare, housing and consumer goods. Main Task was successful at improving living standards, especially access to housing and consumer goods, but failed to match West Germany and led to a severe debt crisis.

== Context ==
The German Democratic Republic (East Germany) was a Marxist-Leninist communist state under the control of the Socialist Unity Party of Germany (SED) which utilised a planned economy. Since their founding in 1949, East Germany was in competition with the Federal Republic of Germany (West Germany), a liberal democracy which utilised a capitalist market economy, as part of the Cold War. The competition was not just a conflict between two states that claimed to be the legitimate government of Germany, but an indictment of their respective political and economic systems. Standards of living of their populations was one of the most important and obvious ways this competition could be measured. In the early 1950s, West Germany began to experience the Wirtschaftswunder ("Economic Miracle"), a period of rapid economic growth and development. East Germany, despite early successes and a generous welfare state, found itself being quickly overtaken in both economic performance and living standards – a disparity which only widened over the next two decades.

In May 1971, Erich Honecker replaced Walter Ulbricht as SED First Secretary (the de facto leader of East Germany), partially due to the poor economic performance of the country. Main Task was proclaimed at the Eighth Congress of the Socialist Unity Party in June, and aimed at increased production of consumer goods for the population and to increase its material well-being in order to provide a higher standard of living for the population. The policy's official goal was "raising the people’s material and cultural standard of living on the basis of a fast developmental pace of socialist production, of higher efficiency, of scientific-technological progress and the growth of the productivity of labour". Or in the official formulation - to achieve "unity of economic and social policy". Honecker imposed a more traditionalist Weimar-era communist ideology which influenced his economic policies as well. Instead of Ulbricht’s technocrats who dreamt about overtaking capitalist West, he promoted ideologues who ended experiments and pursued more short-term goals of increased welfare. Wages, pensions and welfare programs were increased thus providing population with more money to spend on consumer goods. This change of policy was greatly influenced by the 1970 Polish protests which led to greater emphasis on consumer goods and welfare policies in the entire Eastern Bloc. The following few years after Honecker's assumption of power were some of the most prosperous in the history of the East Germany.

== Effects ==
As the working-age population of East Germany was already almost fully employed, to increase productivity the "Scientific Organisation of Labour" policy was introduced in 1973. Three-shift system and elements of Taylorism were introduced to maximize the work intensity. Emphasis on welfare programs for East German women was one of the ways to further increased participation of women in the workforce. In 1970, 82% of working age women were employed, in 1980 this rose to 87%, and in 1989 to 91%.

Great amounts of capital and energy was spent on housing, particularly the building of new housing districts and the restoration of neglected pre-World War II housing stock, in order to provide all families with decent housing. East Germany saw the widespread construction of plattenbau, a local type of prefabricated homes which often came in the form of high-rise tower blocks. While the plattenbau districts lacked individuality or beauty, they provided the basic living needs at a very low cost, as the state was subsidizing much of the rent and utilities costs. Many of Honecker's policies reflected the ideals of his communist youth: cheap housing, utilities and basic foodstuffs meant more to him than cars and modern consumer goods that the East German population increasingly desired, especially when comparing its living standards with those of West Germany. The official statistics claimed that in 1970, for every 100 households there were 15 cars, 53 washing machines, 56 refrigerators and 69 televisions. In 1981, this had risen to 37 cars, 82 washing machines, 99 refrigerators and 90 televisions.

== Debt crisis ==
Between 1971 and 1982, the GDP of East Germany grew at average 5% annually, however the policy only increased the government debts and, by 1982, the state was nearly insolvent. Unable to rapidly increase its welfare and to increase its exports simultaneously, a growing budget deficit created problems as early as 1972. Despite SED propaganda, there were no increases in the socialistic productivity. By the mid-1970s, instead of instituting any new reforms, Honecker decided to fund his policies by increased borrowing of loans from the West, and especially from West Germany. In 1977, hoping to increase its export income, East Germany returned to the ideas of Ulbricht, and began to develop semiconductor and microprocessor industry which, despite large investments, failed to achieve the desired results and export income continued to decrease. It was unable to increase its exports to West as it lacked exportable products of sufficient quality, at the same time it relied on the cheap basic material supplies from the Soviet Union, which demanded payment in East German-produced goods, which were of higher quality than those produced in the Soviet Union.

By the mid-1980s, East Germany's economic growth had declined to less than 1% per year, and the government's economic goals were not reached. Debt skyrocketed as Honecker refused to adopt market-led economic reforms while continuing to subsidise the generous welfare state with money that the government did not have. By 1985, East Germany's debt to Western countries had grown to 25.1 billion Valutamarks, and the debt servicing rate (interest from borrowing) for the foreign currency debt reached 168%.
