= Landwirtschaftliche Produktionsgenossenschaft =

East German agricultural cooperative

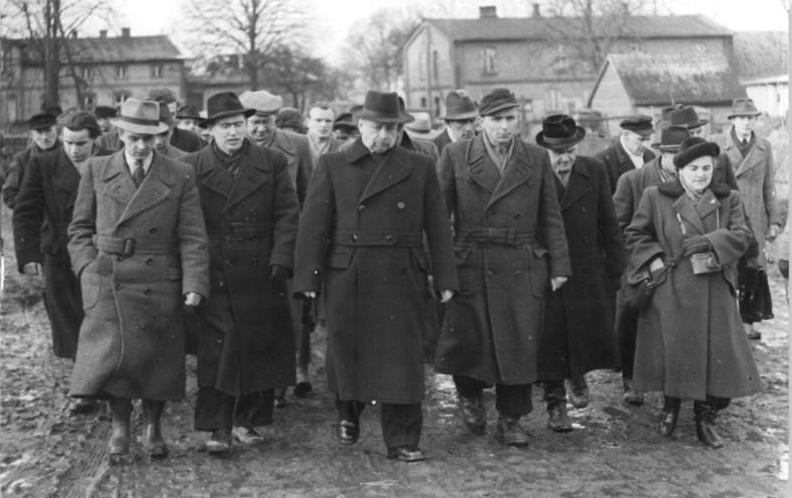
Walter Ulbricht visiting an LPG collective farm in Trinwillershagen in January 1953

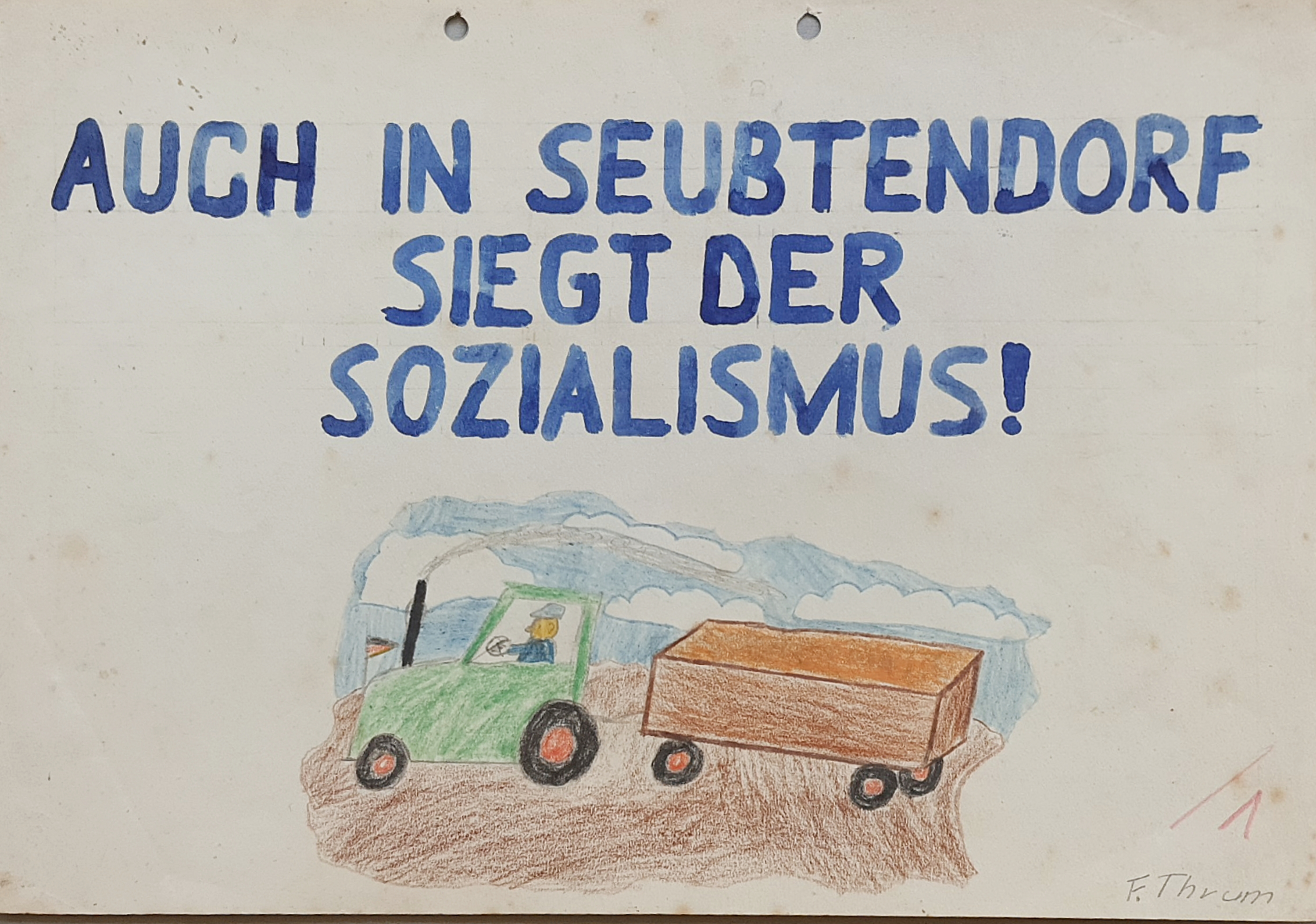
Drawing on the topic of LPG and socialism (at school). 1960 - the year the LPG was founded

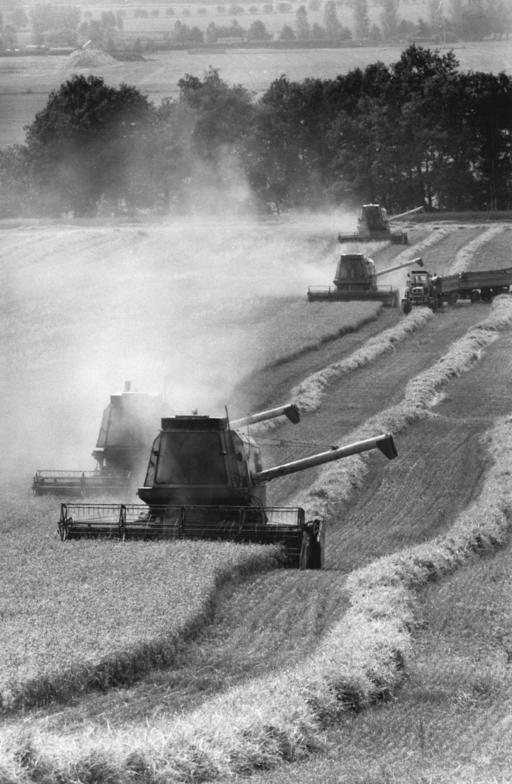
1986 wheat harvest in an LPG

In East Germany, a Landwirtschaftliche Produktionsgenossenschaft (LPG) (English: 'Agricultural Production Cooperative') was a large, collectivised farm in East Germany, corresponding to the Soviet kolkhoz.

In the agriculture of East Germany, the collectivisation of private and state-owned agricultural land was the progression of a policy of food security (at the expense of large scale bourgeois farmers). It began in the years of Soviet occupation (1945–48) as part of the need to govern resources in the Soviet Sector. Beginning with the forced expropriation of all land holdings in excess of 100 ha (250 acres), land was redistributed in small packets of around 5 to 7 ha (12 to 17 acres) to incoming landless refugees driven off formerly German-held territories to the east. These Neubauern (new farmers) were given limited ownership rights to the land, meaning that they kept it as long as they worked it. In the early 1950s, remaining farmers with largish holdings (60 to 80 ha; 150 to 200 acres) were effectively driven out of business through means such as denying access to pooled machinery and by setting production targets that rose exponentially with amount of land owned to levels that were impossible to meet.

Alongside these coercive actions of expropriation, old and new farmers with smaller land holdings were increasingly encouraged to pool resources in a legally constituted cooperative form, the LPG, in which initially just land but later animals and machinery were shared and worked together. These were not "state-owned" farms (although a few of these did exist) - land, except as mentioned above, remained legally in private ownership and the LPG, although often dominated by communist party cadres, was a distinct legal entity operating independently as far as was feasible within the constraints of a planned economy. However, from the early 1960s, pressure mounted on remaining independent farmers to join the LPGs and for existing LPGs to merge in more fully collectivised forms. This process, and a drive to increased industrialisation, led in the 1970s to the separation of crop and animal production and the merging of each across villages to form much larger cooperative units in which, for example, one LPG for crop production with perhaps 3,000 ha (7,400 acres) of land would supply feed to two LPGs working in animal production.

Following German reunification in 1990, the LPG was no longer a legal form of business and regulations were introduced governing their dissolution and the restructuring of enterprises into other legal forms. Some former LPG members, typically those with a strong family background in independent farming, reclaimed their land and started again as independent farmers building up to a viable farm size through renting. In most cases, however, former members or their children settled for some level of compensation in return for surrendering their membership rights to a smaller core group of former managers who then took over the business in the new form of a limited company (GmbH). This settlement and compensation process was at times fought over and at times accepted with resignation depending often on the amount of wealth to be distributed and on the degree of trust by the general membership and village population in the ability of managers to carry on the enterprise as successful employers. In some cases, an eingetragene Genossenschaft, a form of cooperative farming, persisted as allowed under existing German law. While East Elbia (which covered both most of former East Germany and formerly German territories east of the Oder Neisse line which were lost due to World War II) had had more latifundia than western and southern Germany even before the creation of LPGs, one lasting effect of their former existence is that average farm size is larger in each of the New States of Germany than in each of the former Western German states even in the 21st century.

== See also ==
- Volkseigener Betrieb
- Volkseigenes Gut
