= National Farmers Organization =

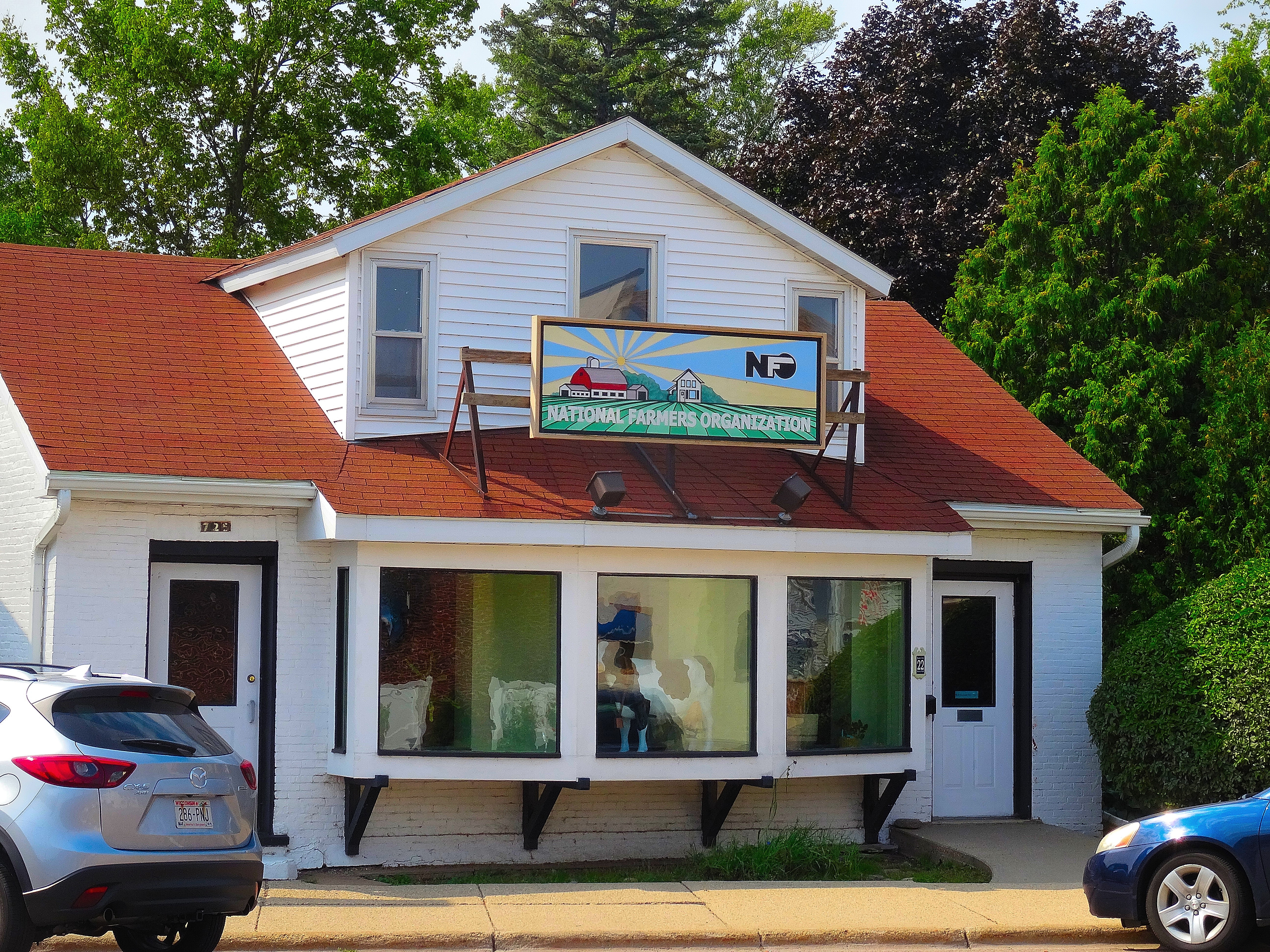
- Sauk City, Wisconsin, NFO Office
- Founded: 1955
- Type: Dairy, Grain, Livestock
- Purpose: Supply coop, advocacy and lobbying
- Location: Ames, Iowa, United States
- Region served: Midwest, Plains, Northeast, Southeast, California

The National Farmers Organization (NFO) is a producer movement founded in the United States in 1955, by farmers, especially younger farmers with mortgages, frustrated by too often receiving crop and produce prices that produced a living that paid less than the minimum wage, and could not even cover the cost of seed, fertilizer, land, etc. This was despite the many hours that was devoted by their entire family (including the farm children) who often worked for free. This was despite mortgages they had to be pay even in years of drought, hail or other crop failure. It was despite too high injury rates related to lifting and too high mortality rates due to working with heavy, sharp equipment. The frustrated farmers, thus, tried to obtain better prices. At first their method included withholding of commodities from sale (standard economics classes teach that reducing supply will increase price if demand remains constant). Their early methods also included opposition to those coops unwilling to withhold goods from market. During protests, the farmers purposely sold food directly to neighbors instead of through the co-ops. They also destroy food in dramatic ways, in an attempt to gain media exposure, for example, slaughtering excess dairy cows. A 1964 incident brought negative attention when two members were crushed under the rear wheels of a cattle truck. They did not succeed in obtaining a Canadian-style quota system. Methods, thus, are different now.

== Founding ==
NFO had its roots in earlier populist agrarian movements such as the Grange, the National Farmers Union, and the Farmers' Alliance.

The NFO was officially founded on September 22, 1955, in Bedford, Iowa. However, it informally began with conversations between farmer Wayne Jackson and feed sales man Jay Loghry in 1953. At a feed sales presentation for Moorman's feed on September 5, 1955, in the Adair County, Iowa, schoolhouse, Loghry suggested to the seven farmers present that they form a new farm organization. Jackson organized the next meeting at Carl, Iowa, which 35 farmers attended. However, much of the initial impetus for the NFO's early growth came from positive comments made by former Iowa Governor Daniel Webster Turner when he was asked about it by the press. Also, Don Berkhahn was instrumental in the early years.

Turner exerted a moderating influence on the organization. He had been Governor of Iowa during the Farmer's Holiday Association movement and had to call-out the state militia to suppress violence associated with that eruption. Governor Turner's political career had foundered due to the Great Depression, but he was still influential in 1955. He sought to direct the nascent NFO organization away from militancy. The NFO took on the character of a “producers union”.

The NFO headquarters was established in Corning, Iowa. Governor Turner had wanted the organization to be headquartered in a small town, instead of in a big city like Kansas City, Omaha, or Chicago. He wanted the NFO to remain in touch with its rural roots. In return for Missourians' supporting Corning as the headquarters’ site, Turner backed Oren Lee Staley from Missouri as the first President of the NFO. In 1989. the national headquarters was relocated to Ames, Iowa.

In its early days as a protest organization, the NFO's membership reached as high as 149,000. Staley is credited with carrying the NFO through the subsequent downturn and establishing a post-protest program for the NFO. Under Staley's leadership the NFO pursued collective bargaining agreements in accordance with the Capper–Volstead Act of 1922.

National Farmers represented dairy producers' interests in federal Milk Marketing Order hearings and started depositing milk checks directly into members' banks. Using group marketing and a supply management system designed by farmers for farms, National Farmers contracts with processors established floor or minimum prices to take rapid fluctuations out of farm-gate milk prices.

The NFO's program involved:

- getting members to sign a membership agreement that named the NFO as their bargaining agent.
- negotiating procurement agent contracts with food processors who buy the produce of the members.
- for milk, cutting handling charges in order to gain market share

== 1964 protests ==
In 1964, the Lake to Lake dairy coop held its annual meeting at Luxemburg High School. Protestors from the National Farmers Organization dumped milk from a milk truck on the school grounds.

In 1964, two NFO members were killed when they and about 500 others attempted to stop a truck from taking cattle to market.

== Holding action of 1967 ==
The NFO engaged in producers strikes called “holding actions” to get food processors who ordinarily held monopsony power over farmers to sign the agency contracts.

On March 16, 1967, the NFO started their most notable holding action. They withheld milk from the market for 15 days, reducing national supplies by two percent. This ended due to a temporary restraining order issued by US Federal Judge Stephenson of the US District Court for Southern Iowa. By the time the restraining order expired, the government negotiated terms agreeable to the NFO. During this withholding, milk supplies in the Nashville, Tennessee, area were reduced from 12,000 to 1,800 gallons per day. All remaining milk was escorted by police to hospitals.

Overall, many public slaughters were held in the late 1960s and early 1970s. Farmers would kill their own animals in front of media representatives. However, this effort backfired because it angered television audiences to see animals being "needlessly and wastefully" killed.

In the 1970s, the National Farmers Organization started working with processors and the food and feed industry to secure supply contracts in all the commodities they represented. The strategy was to sell into rising markets and influence the market positively, rather than feed, and encourage, a continued market downtrend. The group developed a collection, dispatch and delivery system to change the way processors gained supplies.

The NFO failed to persuade the U.S. government to establish a quota system as is currently practiced today in the milk, cheese, eggs and poultry supply management programs in Canada. In 1979, the NFO ended its practice of withholding and protests.

Since then, the NFO has functioned only as a supply coop and as an advocacy and lobbying organization. In particular, in the 1980s, under President DeVon Woodland of Blackfoot, Idaho, the organization specialized more in the business aspects of assisting producers increase revenue, by negotiating better prices and contract sales terms for large volumes of pooled and marketed agricultural commodities. The organization established new headquarters in Ames, Iowa and installed an organization-wide computer system. Field staff offices, dairy re-loads and Livestock Service Centers started operating across the country.

Yearly state conventions are sponsored in multiple states and a monthly magazine is published.

== Sources ==
- Holding Action, by Charles Walters, Jr., Published by Halcyon House - New York & Kansas City, 1968, Library of Congress catalog card number: 68-26115

== See also ==
- 1933 Wisconsin milk strike
- Aaron Sapiro
- Farmers' Holiday Association
- National Grange of the Order of Patrons of Husbandry
- Iowa Cow War
- Market Sharing Quota
- Milk quota
- Producerism
- Supply management (Canada)
