= Farmers' Holiday Association =

Farm producers' association seeking greater Market bargaining power

The Farmers' Holiday Association was a movement of Midwestern United States farmers who, during the Great Depression, endorsed the withholding of farm products from the market, in essence creating a farmers' holiday from work. The Farmers' Holiday Association was organized in May 1932 by Milo Reno. The group urged farmers to declare a "holiday" from farming, with a slogan of "Stay at Home-Buy Nothing-Sell Nothing" and "Lets call a Farmer's Holiday, a Holiday let's hold. We'll eat our wheat and ham and eggs, And let them eat their gold".

Farmers went to extreme measures to ensure that their wants were carried through. One person was killed when the farmers began to blockade roads, and other farmers rallied to destroy their crops, reducing supply, and raising prices. The highways into Sioux City and Council Bluffs, Iowa, were blocked by pickets who dumped farm produce on the side of the road. At Le Mars, Iowa some farmers dragged a judge out of his courtroom, placed a noose around his neck, and threatened to hang him unless he stopped approving farm foreclosures. The striking farmers were countered by sheriffs, the National Guard, and vigilante groups.

Farmers were partially mollified by the New Deal 1933 Agricultural Adjustment Act which paid farmers to limit production which also caused the prices paid to farmers to rise. By 1934, the Farmers' Holiday Association activity had subsided.

== See also ==
- Iowa Cow War
- 1933 Wisconsin milk strike
- Damnation (TV series)
- Aaron Sapiro
- National Farmers Organization
- Milk quota
- Supply management (Canada)
- Market Sharing Quota
- Producerism
