= Dairy and poultry supply management in Canada =

Agricultural policy framework in Canada

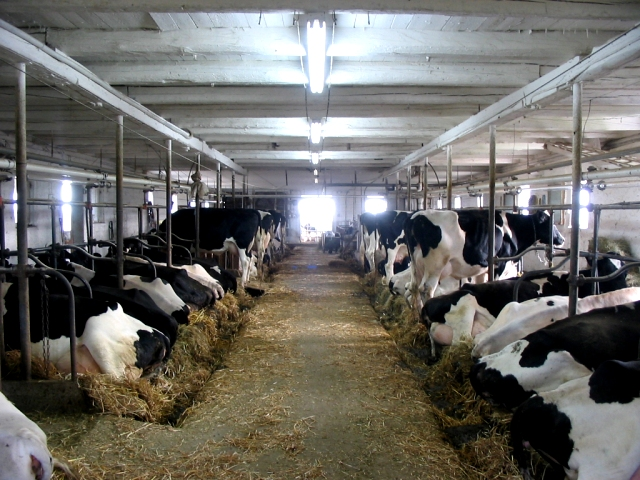
Dairy cattle in a barn in Quebec

Canada's supply management (French: Gestion de l'offre), abbreviated SM, is a national agricultural policy framework used across the country, which controls the supply of dairy, poultry and eggs through production and import mechanisms to ensure that prices for supply-managed farmers are both stable and predictable. The supply management system was authorized by the 1972 Farm Products Agencies Act, which established the two national agencies that oversee the system. The Agriculture and Agri-Food Canada federal department is responsible for both the Canadian Dairy Commission and its analogue for eggs, chicken and turkey products, the Farm Products Council of Canada. Five national supply management organizations, the SM-5 Organizations — Egg Farmers of Canada (EFC), Turkey Farmers of Canada (TFC), Chicken Farmers of Canada (CFC), the Canadian Hatching Egg Producers (CHEP) and the Ottawa-based Canadian Dairy Commission (CDC), a Crown corporation — in collaboration with provincial and national governing agencies, organizations and committees, administer the supply management system.

In the dairy industry, the supply management system implements the federated provincial policy through the Canadian Milk Supply Management Committee (CMSMC), CDC, three regional milk pools — Newfoundland's, the five eastern provinces (P5) and the four western provinces — and provincial milk marketing boards. Since 1970, the CMSMC has set the yearly national industrial raw milk production quota or Market Sharing Quota (MSQ) and the MSQ share for each province to ensure Canada to match production with domestic need and to remain self-sufficient in milk fat. Each province allocates MSQs to individual dairy farmers. In 2017, there were 16,351 dairy, poultry and eggs farms under supply management.

While many federal and provincial politicians from major parties "have long maintained support for a supply-managed system for dairy, poultry and egg farmers", there has been ongoing debate about SM. Proponents of the framework tend to claim that it is designed to ensure that these farms can be profitable and Canadian consumers have access to a "high-quality, secure" supply of what they claim to be "sensitive products" at stable prices without shortages and surpluses. Opponents of the system tend to view it as an attempt by members of the supply managed industries to form a publicly supported "cartel" and profit at the expense of purchasers. Supply management's supporters say that the system offers stability for producers, processors, service providers and retailers. The controls provided by supply management have allowed the federal and provincial governments to avoid subsidizing the sectors directly, in contrast to general practice in the European Union and the United States. Detractors have criticized tariff-rate import quotas, price-control and supply-control mechanisms used by provincial and national governing agencies, organizations and committees. Canada's trade partners posit that SM limits market access.

The Organisation for Economic Co-operation and Development (OECD) maintained in 2017 that Canada's "export growth would be boosted if Canada phased out its Canadian dairy supply management policies". Supply management was one of many issues in Comprehensive Economic and Trade Agreement (CETA), a free-trade agreement between Canada, the European Union and its member states and Comprehensive and Progressive Agreement for Trans-Pacific Partnership (CPTPP) negotiations and the United States Mexico Canada Agreement (USMCA). Under the October 1, 2018, United States Mexico Canada Agreement, the supply management system remained fundamentally intact however some modifications to the milk class system have weakened supply management.

== Mandate ==
Canada's supply management system, which encompasses "five types of products: dairy, chicken and turkey products, table eggs, and broiler hatching eggs," "coordinates production and demand while controlling imports as a means of setting stable prices for both farmers and consumers." The dairy supply management system is administered by the federal government through the Ottawa-based Canadian Dairy Commission (CDC) a Crown corporation. The Agriculture and Agri-Food Canada federal department is responsible for both the Canadian Dairy Commission and its analogue for eggs, chicken and turkey products, the Farm Products Council of Canada.

== Supply-managed sectors ==
As of 2018, there were about 12,000 dairy farms, 2,800 chicken farmers, 1,000 regulated egg farmers who produce table eggs and broiler hatching eggs, and 551 turkey farmers, that operated under supply management. According to the 2016 Canadian Census of Agriculture, there were 193,492 farms in Canada; about 12 per cent of Canadian farms were under supply management.

== Regulatory framework ==
There are five national organizations, known jointly as the SM-5 Organizations, that administer or support agricultural supply management systems. According to a CBC article, "The SM-5 Organizations say federal-provincial agreements for each of the supply-managed sectors weave together the legislative jurisdiction of both levels of government to 'ensure a seamless regulatory scheme'... "designed to enable farmers to get a reasonable return while stabilizing the supply of agricultural products to Canadian consumers."

The supply management system was authorized in 1972 through the Farm Products Agencies Act and subsequently the national agencies that established the system were created. The Canadian Milk Supply Management Committee, which is chaired by CDC is "responsible for the administration of supply management for the dairy industry". By 1983 all provinces except Newfoundland had signed the National Milk Marketing Plan (NMMP) which replaced the 1971 Interim Comprehensive Milk Marketing Plan. The goal of the NMMP agreement was to manage the supply of raw industrial milk to meet Canadian needs, to establish provincial MSQs and to raise fees to remove surplus.

In 1972, the national marketing agency to administer the supply management system for eggs, Egg Farmers of Canada (EFC), was established. In 1974 one was set up for turkey farmers, Turkey Farmers of Canada (TFC), and the chicken marketing agency, Chicken Farmers of Canada (CFC), was created in 1978, and the Canadian Hatching Egg Producers (CHEP) agency was established in 1986.

The National Farm Products Marketing Council, now the Farm Products Council of Canada, established by the 1972 Farm Products Agencies Act, oversees the national supply management system agencies for eggs, chicken, and turkey.

The Farm Products Council of Canada "oversees the various agencies in an effort to promote an efficient and competitive agricultural sector while ensuring that the marketing system operates well, in the interests of producers and consumers."

In Ontario, for example, the 2017 Agricultural Products Marketing Act (FPMA) "allows the Minister of Agriculture and Food to enter into contracts with the federal government to have national marketing agencies perform marketing functions within Ontario on behalf of the Ontario government" through the Ontario Farm Products Marketing Commission.

=== Milk supply management ===
The milk supply management system is a "federated provincial policy" with four governing agencies, organizations and committees—Canadian Dairy Commission, Canadian Milk Supply Management Committee (CMSMC), regional milk pools, and provincial milk marketing boards.

==== Canadian Dairy Commission (CDC) ====
The Ottawa-based Canadian Dairy Commission (CDC) composed mostly of dairy farmers, was created in 1966. The federal government is involved in SM through the CDC in the administration of imports and exports. The CDC establishes "support prices for butter and skim milk powder (SMP) and operates surplus removals at the support prices, removing butterfat and SMP from the market for export or later sale. It also facilitates the process for the setting of Market Sharing Quota (MSQ) for industrial milk nationally." According to the CDC website, it operates as an agency supporting "farmers, processors and consumers." CDC, under CEO Serge Riendeau—a former farmer, dairy producer and Agropur Cooperative Director—also "manages programs that target the industry, upholds milk quality standards and supports Canadians working in the dairy industry". Riendeau is responsible for "cooperating and negotiating with dairy industry stakeholders to reconcile their interests and maintain compliance with the supply management system". Riendeau, who was a farmer and dairy producer before becoming President of Agropur Cooperative in 1992, advocates for the "supply management system" and "was instrumental in the establishment of a national strategy to promote the use of Canadian dairy ingredients."

==== The Canadian Milk Supply Management Committee (CMSMC) ====
In 1970, the Canadian Milk Supply Management Committee (CMSMC), was established to set the national industrial milk Market Sharing Quota (MSQ) which is then allocated among the provinces. The national MSQs "ensure that Canada is self-sufficient in milk fat."

The CMSMC, which is chaired by the Ottawa-based Canadian Dairy Commission (CDC), administers SM for the dairy sector with the CDC performing a role of supervision, support and regulation.

==== Regional milk pools ====
There are three regional milk pools—Newfoundland's, the Eastern Canadian Milk Pooling P5 Agreement which includes Prince Edward Island, Nova Scotia, New Brunswick, Québec and Ontario and the Western Milk Pooling Agreement (WMP) which includes Manitoba, Saskatchewan, Alberta and British Columbia, that operate under the supervision of the CDC. They pool milk sale revenues, costs and markets, and harmonize pricing and establish daily quotas.

Under GATT's Article XI supply management enjoyed an exemption. When Article XI was lost during the Uruguay round of negotiations (1986-1993), tariffs were introduced to protect Canada's domestic dairy. The loss of Article XI was one of the driving forces behind the formation of a milk pooling agreement. When the WTO replaced GATT in 1995, it was recognized by Canada's Dairy Industry Advisory Committee that expanded regional milk pools would be needed to adapt to changes.

==== Provincial marketing boards ====
Dairy producers must hold a quota or permit to sell their products to a processing plant. These quotas, or Market Sharing Quota (MSQ), avoid overproduction. In the SM system, provincial marketing boards, allocate production quotas or MSQs on milk for example, based on regional milk pools recommendations which include daily milk quotas.

The provincial milk marketing boards are responsible for most of the regulation of milk marketing, organization of dairy producers, quota administration and transfers, and producer-processor settlement. Individual provinces regulate their own marketing systems with marketing boards that may engage in product promotion, collective sales, and price negotiation. Marketing boards have regulatory control over the feeding, treatment, and conditions of animals on farms, as the board is in direct control of the quota allotted and can directly sanction farms who violate board policy. In Ontario the FPMA authorizes the province to control and regulate the production and marketing of Ontario farm products [except dairy products] including their prohibition. The Dairy Farmers of Ontario regulate the dairy marketing system.

During the 2015 TPP negotiations, as the United States, New Zealand and Australia called for an end to SM, the role of the provincial marketing boards was challenged. By October 2015, however, it was agreed that in exchange for an opening the market to other countries, marketing boards could continue to perform their decision-making role in production quotas and farm gate prices.

== Background ==
A 2001 "NAFTA - Report Card on Agriculture", traces the history of trade disputes to the 1930s. After the United States enacted the Smoot–Hawley Tariff Act in 1930, US tariffs rose to record levels. This devastated the Canadian economy and resulted in implementation of protectionism at a global level. By 1932, Canadian exports dropped from $515 million to $235 million. Canada, the United States, and many other countries erected "high and discriminatory barriers" in the pursuit of "beggar-thy-neighbor" policies. The signing of the first liberal trade agreement, the 1936 Canada–US agreement, by President Franklin D. Roosevelt and Prime Minister Mackenzie King represented the start of an economic relationship between the two countries that resulted in the steady decline of trade barriers such as tariffs.

Post-WWII, following the collapse of world trade, negotiators of multilateral trade agreements, including advocates of free trade and protectionism, carved out the General Agreement on Tariffs and Trade (GATT), first signed by 23 countries in 1947. Under GATT, "imposing import controls on commodities subject to supply management [was] a valid and recognized practice. Such controls prevent[ed] the displacement of significant quantities of Canadian dairy products on the Canadian market, and thus protect[ed] [Canadian] producers against losses incurred through having to export all production in excess of domestic demand.

In the 1950s and 1960s there was volatility in dairy prices, dairy producers had more bargaining power relative to dairy farmers, and the United Kingdom was poised to enter the European Common Market, resulting in the loss of Canada's largest dairy export customer. As low milk prices continued into the 1960s, the Canadian Dairy Commission Act was passed in 1967, establishing the Canadian Dairy Commission (CDC). The CDC's mandate was to ensure producers received a fair return on investment, and to ensure the quality and supply of milk.

Through the 1958 federal Agricultural Stabilization Act (ASA), an agricultural commodity could be designated by the ASA for direct deficiency payments if the price dropped 80% below the price averaged over the preceding decade. This was the first act of its kind in Canada and a majority of ASA cash subsidies to farmers went to the dairy industry for industrial milk—milk used in making cheese, milk powder and butter.

Supply management in its current form dates from federal legislation passed in December 1971 under the Pierre Elliot Trudeau government. Trudeau had expressed support for the system since 1949 when he was as an assistant to Robert Gordon Robertson.

The Canadian Milk Supply Management Committee (CMSMC) was first introduced in 1970 as the body responsible for setting the national Market Sharing Quota (MSQ). By 1974, every province except Newfoundland had signed on. The dairy industry was the first in Canada to be operated through the national supply management system. Following dairy, a national supply management system was implemented for eggs in 1972, turkey in 1974, chicken in 1978 and chicken hatching eggs in 1986. The national agencies for eggs, turkeys, and chickens were also established in the 1970s.

When the European Economic Community (EEC) adopted Canada's model in introducing its own quotas in April 1984, they were motivated by a milk supply surplus. In Canada, where there was no milk surplus in the 1970s—the MSQs were designed to "guarantee a fair level of return for producers and to promote a stable supply of high-quality dairy products for consumers."

In 1981, American economist Thomas Borcherding published his 117-page report entitled "The Egg Marketing Board" for the Fraser Institute in which he used the phrase, the "egg marketing cartel". In the same year, based on his report, he also wrote several 1981 articles and editorials in The Globe and Mail about the artificially high-prices of eggs in Canada allegedly caused by a supply management mechanism, egg marketing boards, which Borcherding called an "egg marketing cartel". According to Simon Fraser University professor emeritus, Donald Gutstein in his 2014 publication Harperism, this marked the beginning of an aggressive campaign by the Fraser Institute and other think tanks, that he described as neo-liberal, to eliminate supply management in the ensuing decades. (Note: In Harperism (2014), Gutstein groups think tanks, such as the Fraser Institute, C.D. Howe, Atlantic Institute for Market Studies (AIMS), the Montreal Economic Institute (MEI), Frontier Centre for Public Policy, and the School of Public Policy, University of Calgary as a pro-economic freedom, neo-liberal think tanks who focus on eliminating supply management because they say it is market distorting.)

The historic Canada-U.S. Free Trade Agreement (CUSFTA) came into force on January 1, 1989. CUSTFA, which built on GATT rights and obligations, was the largest trade agreement concluded between two countries up to that time.

When the North American Free Trade Agreement (NAFTA) came into force on January 1, 1994, the Canadian dairy system was not part of negotiations.

Following the establishment of the World Trade Organization (WTO) in 1995, when Canada was forced to remove some of its export subsidies, dairy farmers underwent a major consolidation. The federal government and the CDC created the a new more stringent pricing system which was still in place in 2018. The four sectors in 1995 were grains and oilseeds with 90,000 farmers, beef and hog farmers with 75,000 farmers, supply-managed dairy, poultry and egg sectors with 30,000 farmers, and horticulture with 9000 farmers.

Canada participated in the WTO Doha Development Round (DDA) of trade-negotiations that began in 2001 with the objective of facilitating global trade by lowering trade barriers. By 2004, whereas previously, Canada's supply management system had some support from other countries, in Geneva, the system was under attack. "In terms of supply management, and in the case of the Wheat Board...we were under attack. It was one against 146. We had absolutely no allies at the negotiating table."

A WTO panel ruled in 2002 that Canada "breached its trade obligations through its dairy support, siding with the United States. The result of the WTO ruling is that Canada is not allowed to export much dairy."

In 2005, "MPs voted unanimously in favour of a motion reiterating" their support for supply management. All the parties say it is "necessary so farmers can earn a decent living." Liberals published a press release to tell Conservatives that they "must protect supply management." "Canadian politicians have long maintained support for a supply-managed system for dairy, poultry and egg farmers."

In December 2006, in an interview with the Western Producer, Trade Minister David Emerson under Conservative Prime Minister Stephen Harper predicted that the SM would limit Canada's trading ability and in the end Canada would lose in trade negotiations. In March 2007, Emerson walked back his statement, and reiterated the Harper administration's support for supply management.

In the 2008 OECD policy brief, "Economic survey of Canada 2008: Modernising Canada's agricultural policies", was highly critical of supply managed sectors especially dairy farming.

A November 2009 report by the Standing Committee on International Trade (CIIT), in preparation for TPP talks, recommended that "the Government of Canada affirm its unequivocal support of, and commitment to defend, Canada's supply management system." The House of Commons "unanimously passed a resolution instructing Canadian negotiators to defend supply management". This "unanimous support for supply management among Canada’s main political parties" was explained in part by the fact that supply-managed sectors employed 232,000 across Canada and contributed "over $13 billion to GDP annually.

In April 2010, the Globe and Mail reported that Canada was denied a seat at the TPP negotiating table because New Zealand opposed Canada's "official position in support of supply managed poultry, egg and dairy sectors." In 2010, it was expected that in the TPP negotiations, agriculture would be the "game-changer affecting hundreds of thousands of farmers particularly in Canada, particularly in the supply-managed sectors."

Against the backdrop of the TPP talks, a series of articles were published that were "highly critical of milk supply management" and supporters of supply management responded with counter-arguments. David E. Bond, the retired chief economist of HSBC Bank Canada, published an opinion piece in the Globe and Mail (Note: Bond wrote that, "The federal government imposes tariffs that run between 200 per cent and 300 per cent on virtually all dairy imports, even from those nations with which we have free-trade agreements." He concluded that, "It is the largest agricultural subsidy given to Québec, and therefore politically untouchable." The highest tariff Bond cited, 300% TRQ on butter, is actually never applied as Canada does not import butter above the TRQ threshold.) stating that the "government sanctioned" National Dairy Policy resulted in a "wealth transfer of more than $2.4-billion annually from consumers and food processors to dairy farmers. That's more than $175,000 for each dairy farmer." Ed Mussell of the George Morris Centre and Maurice Doyon, a professor in the Department of Agricultural Economics and Consumer Science at Laval University described the series of articles and their counter-arguments from supporters of supply management, as "a great deal of rhetoric, simplistic arguments and invalid and untested assumptions".

== Debate ==
Sylvain Charlebois from Dalhousie University, a well-known critic of supply management, has argued since 1998 that the system needs to be reformed. He has published numerous studies on the issue, suggesting the system would need to make sectors more competitive, and open to international trades. However, in an August 2018 CBC interview, Charlebois cautioned that it would be "too dangerous" to abolish the SM system now: Canadian farms are not competitive. As well, the multibillion-dollar quotas held by thousands of individual farmers, have been used as collateral to take out government loans and invest in farm improvements. He called for a debate on an SM phase out instead.

Martha Hall Findlay ran for the Liberal Party leadership of the Liberal Party in the 2013 race, on a "mostly one-issue campaign", abolishing supply management. According to The Washington Post, "her taboo-breaking crusade inspired a deluge of favorable (sic) editorials that helped make supply management — the Canadian jargon for dairy protectionism — a household phrase." Hall Findlay's widely cited June 2012 paper, uploaded to the School of Public Policy, University of Calgary site, where she was an Executive Fellow, called for an end to Canada's supply management system. Hall Findlay published a number of articles based on her report in Maclean's. At the same time, other right wing think tanks, such as the Macdonald-Laurier Institute and the Fraser Institute, released their studies on the negative effect supply management had on the Canadian economy.

In his 2014 paper published by Centre for International Governance Innovation (CIGI), University of Waterloo by Bruce Muirhead, an historian and Egg Farmers of Canada Chair in Public Policy, and cited in the Library of Parliament, "supply management benefits all Canadians." Muirhead wrote, "To lose it, however, would be a tragedy — it has served dairy farmers, consumers and processors well over the years, providing cost-effective, safe and secure dairy products in a world where those realities are increasingly difficult to guarantee".

In March 2015 University of Manitoba professors Professors Ryan Cardwell, Chad Lawley, along with then-PhD student, Di Xiang, published an article in the Canadian Public Policy (CPP) journal entitled "Milked and Feathered: The Regressive Welfare Effects of Canada’s Supply Management". They concluded that supply management was regressive and placed a greater burden on lowest income households with children, representing up to $592 more annually for dairy and poultry based on Statistics Canada data from 2001. Their award-winning article generated much media attention. (Note: In June 2016, Cardwell and Lawley received the Canadian Economics Association's John Vanderkamp Prize for best CPP 2016 article.)

By October 2015, as part of its commitment under the Trans-Pacific Partnership (TPP), Canada, under the Harper administration, had agreed to cut back both dairy tariffs and import quotas. (Note: Thus, the only reason import restrictions on dairy products are even an issue is because the U.S. withdrew from the TPP.) In return Canada kept its SM policies in place with provincial marketing boards still deciding the farm gate price of milk and production quotas, but with some adjustments for opening up the Canadian dairy market by 3.25%. The U.S. had asked for 10%. When the U.S. under the Trump administration withdrew from TPP on January 24, 2017, the tariff-rate quotas (TRQ) on dairy products remained in effect. No U.S. exports ever pay the 200 to over 300% TRQs because US dairy products are never imported to Canada outside the TRQ.

In April 2017, President Trump, while visiting Wisconsin, said he would "stand up for our dairy farmers" against Canada's "unfair” practices" without specifying which "parts of Canada’s tariff-protected dairy sector he wanted to change, nor what measures [Trump] would take to make it happen". As a result, Australia and New Zealand "re-ignited" their calls for a "fresh complaint" to the World Trade Organization. It evolved into the end of such surplus sales and called for the dismantling of the supply management system within 10 years, or, at least concessions, to allow greater market access for their country’s products.

Following his June 3, 2018 interview on NBC's Meet the Press with Chuck Todd, in which Prime Minister Trudeau clarified Canada's position on newly imposed tariffs, the Dairy Farmers of Canada (DFC) wrote Trudeau to advise against concluding an agreement that would "negatively impact the dairy farming community." Trudeau has mentioned that the US "want a better deal on their auto sector from Mexico, and I think they want more access on certain agriculture products like dairy to Canada. We--We're moving towards, you know, flexibility in those areas that I thought was very, very promising."

On June 13, against the backdrop of NAFTA re-negotiations, Andrew Scheer, the leader of the opposition—the Conservative Party of Canada—removed Maxime Bernier, MP for Beauce, from his shadow cabinet, allegedly for his party disloyalty for his April 2018 online publication of a chapter from his postponed book Doing Politics Differently: My Vision for Canada. In the chapter, "Live or die with supply management", Bernier explained why ending supply management was one of his major campaign issues when he ran unsuccessfully in 2016-2017 for leadership of the Conservative Party. In January 2017, a Québécois farmer, Jacques Roy, created a Facebook group, "Les amis de la Gestion de L'offre et des Régions" (Friends of Supply Management and Rural Communities) with Martin Nichols, to promote the "selection of a pro-supply management Conservative Party leader" in the 2017 CPC race. They became CPC members and encouraged others to join. By July 2017, the group had about 10,000 members. Bernier wrote that the group, which he said, supported Andrew Scheer as CPC leader, had joined the CPC party just before the election were "fake Conservatives".

Bernier said that he was dismissed from the cabinet because of his view of SM. On June 12, during Question Period, Liberal ministers, Diane Lebouthillier and Chrystia Freeland, had said that Bernier was clear proof that Conservatives would not defend it.

In a June 15, 2018 press statement, U.S. Agriculture Secretary Sonny Perdue at Lawrence MacAulay's family farm, Perdue said that he was not attempting to convince Canada to abolish the SM system. He said, "We all have our interests and Canada has an embedded supply management system in their dairy industry, and it's not our desire to do away with that, just to regulate it in a way that does not depress world prices." Back in Wisconsin, Perdue clarified that while the U.S. should not request that Canada eliminate SM, it would be difficult to reach a NAFTA agreement with Class 7 in place.

By July 2018, with Canada and the U.S. "locked in an unprecedented, cross-border trade fight", President Trump said that he would not commit to any new NAFTA agreement until after the 2018 midterm elections. Trump "has frequently attacked Canadian trade barriers on agriculture — dairy products in particular — as unfairly hurting American farmers...Trudeau has insisted the U.S. president's complaints about Canada's trade barriers are the result of Canada's refusal to give in to Trump's demands to do away with the country's supply-management system, which is designed to protect dairy, poultry and egg producers." However, a "vocal contingent" of American dairy farmers support the Canadian supply and management system. In March 2018, both the Wisconsin Farmers Union (WFU) and Dairy Farmers of America (DFA) were looking at Canada's supply management system to resolve their own problems of low prices resulting in farm failures.

In 2017, the federal government established a five-year $250 million Dairy Farm Investment Program (DFIP), to lessen the impacts of CETA's implementation on dairy farmers. The first round of funds were distributed to eligible licensed dairy farms in 2018. Each applicant is eligible for up to $250,000 in DFIP funds over the five-year period to upgrade milk production equipment.

After the Conservative convention in August 2018, Scheer denied an allegation that the Dairy Farmers of Canada worked with his office to block a motion changing the party stance on supply management after a binder from the Dairy Farmers of Canada was found by a delegate.

== Policy ==
The national supply management system has three basic pillars: production control, pricing mechanism, and import control. The five sectors operate in a similar way, even though they operate under separate provincial marketing boards and national organizations. All five systems have the following elements in common. A quota system controls production volume, through the Market Sharing Quota (MSQ), for example. Through tariff-rate quotas (TRQs), the volume of imported product is limited. Pricing mechanisms that control the farm gate price that producers receive based on cost of production, are coordinated through provincial marketing boards and national organizations.

=== Production Control ===
National agencies, such as the Egg Farmers of Canada (EFC), Turkey Farmers of Canada (CFC), Chicken Farmers of Canada (CFC), Canadian Hatching Egg Producers (CHEP), and the Canadian Dairy Commission (CDC), are mandated to "prevent surpluses and shortages that can cause significant price fluctuations" by "setting the national production level based on provincial demand." Under the authority of the Farm Products Agencies Act the individual national agencies can "restrict production", "set provincial production quotas" and "impose penalties for overproduction or underproduction". It is the role of each provincial board to set "minimum quotas and quota transfer rules", to negotiate prices with buyers, for example, the three major processors, Parmalat, Saputo Inc and Agropur, and to allocate production among farmers. If farmers fail to produce within their "allotted quota" they may face penalties.

=== Market Sharing Quota (MSQ) ===
A permit to sell under supply management caps is called a Market Sharing Quota (MSQ). By 2001, all Canadian provinces were signatories to the National Milk Marketing Plan (NMMP) which fixes a yearly production quota for industrial raw milk across Canada and each province's share of the Market Sharing Quota (MSQ). In some provinces, fluid milk quotas were managed separately by provincial marketing boards, while industrial raw milk was managed by CDC's MSQs. Most provinces roll fluid quota and MSQ into a single production quota, held by dairy producers. The production quota system was designed to prevent overproduction. Each province then allocates MSQs to individual dairy farmers according to provincial policies and based on pooling agreements. Since the 1970s the Canadian dairy industry SM system matches production with domestic market needs.

MSQs can be inherited for free or sold, subject to regulations from the respective board.

In Ontario, from 2000 to 2010, quota values increased to $25,000/kg of butterfat, a significant leap. This represents the quota or permit required for one dairy cow's production and therefore represents the right to keep a single dairy cow. By 2015, a MSQ was valued at $30,000. By 2018, the combined value of MSQs was $CDN35 billion. "Farmers use quota as collateral, and total farm debt across Canada amounts to $102 billion — nearly one-third of it lent through a federal agency." An average dairy farm of 70 cattle would hold quotas worth 2,100,000.

According to the annual Dairy Farm Accounting Project report, Ontario dairy farmers saw their net farm profit drop from Can$178,601 in 2012 to Can$90,114 in 2016, the lowest point since 2006. The June 2018 report, showed that the net farm income in 2017 was Can$128,230, the first increase since 2012. According to a 2008 OECD policy brief, the median gross income in 2007, before expenses, for a dairy farmer was Can$250,000 a year. In 2006, milk quota values on their balance sheets soared to over Can$26 billion" or about 2% of total GDP. OECD says that SM's very high milk quota created "barriers to entry for young producers." For farmers wishing to enter the market, the price of the quota can be up to 75% of start-up costs. This can leave farmers entering the industry with a heavy debt burden, or effectively exclude them from ever starting. A Conference Board of Canada report estimated the book value of dairy quota at about $3.6 to $4.7 billion. Speaking at a GrowCanada 2014 agricultural conference, Mulroney said "we should consider "a careful, innovative and generous phase-out of our supply managed programs for dairy and poultry.

=== Pricing mechanisms ===
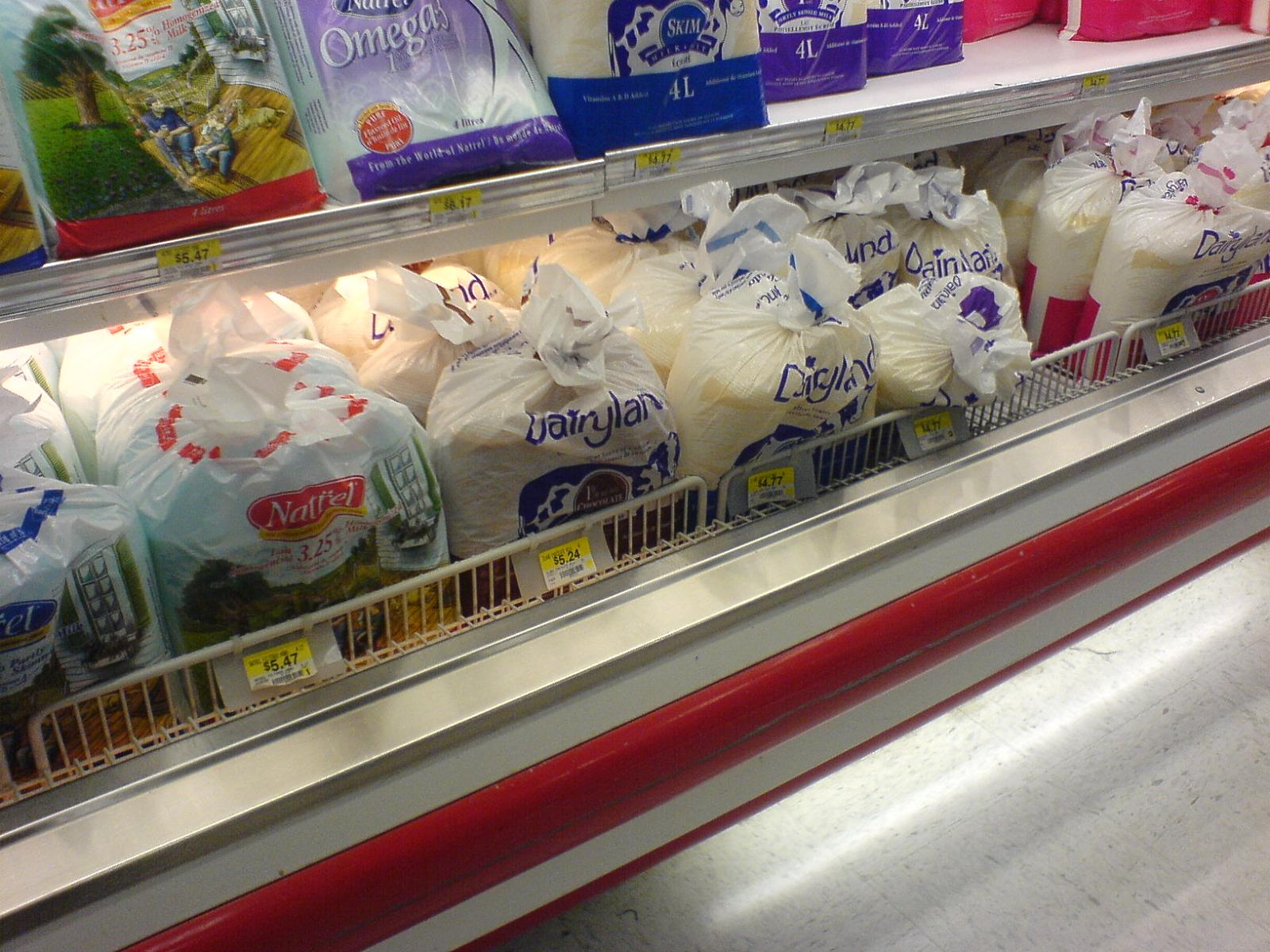
Retail sale of Class 1 4-litre milk bags in London, Ontario (2007). SM sets quotas and support prices at the farm gate for industrial raw milk.

To establish a "fair price", the CDC consults with "dairy producers, processors, further processors, restaurateurs and consumers" each fall, then completes an annual study to determine the support price for industrial raw milk. Along with the study, Commissioners also consider factors such as "arguments presented by various stakeholders, an evaluation of the processors' margin, and economic indicators such as the consumer price index". The support price is posted each December and effective in February of the following year.

Producers create the goods (milk, poultry or eggs), and sell them to either processors or consumers at farm gate prices. Farm gate prices are set by negotiations between the farmers and downstream processors and ratified by the Local Marketing Board (one for each Province or Territory). The farm gate price that the processors or consumer pay is the minimum legal price, but the farmer could negotiate a higher price with one or more of their customers.

==== End-use classifying price system ====
In 1993 multiple component pricing was implemented with dairy farmers were no longer paid based on volume of milk, they were paid based on butterfat, protein and other milk solids. In 1995 changes were made in to the Canadian Dairy Commission (CDC) Act to allow the CDC to operate revenue sharing milk pools resulting in a national harmonized milk classification system using end-use pricing.

Both the Canadian and American dairy industries apply end-use classified pricing systems. In Canada, for example, prices of raw industrial milk purchased by milk processors are based on end-use−fluid consumption, yogurt, ice cream, cottage cheese, butter, whole milk powder, skim milk and milk protein concentrates (MPCs). The highest price is for Class A or Class 1 for fluid consumption and the lowest price is for milk products in 'Special Milk Class 7', a new class Canada introduced in February/March 2017. By 2005, the United States had four classes and by 2016 Canada had five. In Canada industrial raw milk is sold to three major processors, Parmalat, Saputo Inc and Agropur. Class 1 included fluid liquid products; Class 2 included yogurt, ice cream, soft products; Class 3 included Cheese; Class 4 included butter, milk powders and Class 5 included exports under access, permits 5(d) subsidized exports. In April 2016, Ontario began to implement a new milk price (Class 6) and Manitoba did the same in August 2016.

By June 2015, skim milk processing plants hit their capacity in Ontario, Québec and the Maritimes. The Dairy Farmers of Nova Scotia, the producers' marketing board, that purchases pools of raw milk from farmers to sell to dairy milk processors, raised their milk quota in March 2015, in response to an "unprecedented" increase in demand for butter and cream. They were left with a surplus of skimmed milk.

Canada's supply management system attracted media attention in 2016, when the province of Ontario responded to the exponential increase of the imports of diafiltered milk (UV) from the United States. In April 2016, the Dairy Farmers of Ontario created a new class of milk designed to encourage processors to invest in new facilities in Canada. They adjusted prices for certain milk ingredients such as MPIs, to compete with U.S. proteins.

The Global Dairy Ingredients Market (Note: Global Dairy Ingredients Market Dairy ingredients market include whey ingredients, milk powder, milk protein isolates (MPI), milk protein concentrates (MPCs), casein, caseinates, lactose, and others.) is booming and expected to increase as these relatively new milk products, specifically milk protein isolates (MPIs), milk protein concentrates (MPCs), also known as ultrafiltered milk (UV) or diafiltered milk, entered the marketplace. MPC's are produced in facilities in the U.S. along the CA-US border. Compared with raw milk, MPIs are inexpensive and easier to ship and more efficient in cheese production. Because the technology was invented post-NAFTA, and because they were listed as proteins by Canada's border agency, not milk, at the Canadian border U.S. MPI were both tariff and quota free. The MPIs were a "cheap alternative to skim milk for Canadian processors such as Saputo Inc and Parmalat Canada Inc, who must meet federal standards for milk and protein content in cheese". By October 2008, the TRQ for MPIs was put in place and there was a very strong import demand in 2009. By 2010, MPIs were placed under Re-export Program (IREP). By 2011, the TRQs for MPCs were always filled and the demand for Re-export Program (IREP) was strong. Over a five-year period ending in January 2016, the quantity of U.S. milk protein isolates imports rose to 2,700 tonnes—an increase of ten times by volume, representing about $150 million a year.

In response to the new Class 6 introduced by Ontario in 2016, Agropur cancelled its MPIs (diafiltered milk) contracts with American facilities, such as Cayuga Milk Ingredients, who claimed they lost $30 million in exports. Cayuga, Wisconsin-based Grassland Dairy Products Inc and other US facilities in turn cancelled contracts with dozens of dairy farmers in Wisconsin and the New York. There are concerns that "thousands of [US] family farms could be lost without access to Canada's processors' contracts. Politicians in affected states blamed Canada for the threats to dairy farms and asked for intervention from the Trump administration. In June 2016, federal Agriculture Minister Lawrence MacAulay responded to concerns from Canadian dairy farmers that US MPIs caused a "reduced demand for domestic milk."

==== Class 7 ====
In March 2017, the Canadian dairy industry implemented a Canada-wide domestic policy, creating a lower-priced class of industrial milk, Class 7, as part of Canada's National Ingredient Strategy negotiated between Canadian processors and producers, to address the surplus of 'non-fat solids' which include milk ingredients such as whole milk powder, skim milk and milk protein concentrates (MPCs) as "fast-rising volumes of U.S. milk proteins not subject to high tariffs" flowed into Canada. Class 7 promotes the production of protein substances in Canada using Canadian milk and benefits the domestic cheese-manufacturing sector. According to the media outlets in October 2017, in the list of U.S. requests in the NAFTA negotiations, the phasing out of SM over a ten-year period and the elimination of the Class 7 mechanism, were included. In April 2018, a 68-member bi-partisan group of members of Congress wrote a letter to U.S. Trade Representative Robert Lighthizer calling for the removal of Class 7 and other Canadian dairy policies. In their July 2018 report, Canadian agrifood economists, Al Mussell and Douglas Hedley, explained how Canada's SM system, which was bound by a butterfat quota, would become bound by a skim quota because of the "structural surplus of skim" which threatens to overpower the SM system.

Ten dairy industry organisations, including the Dairy Companies Association of New Zealand (DCANZ) and other dairy industry leaders from the US, EU, Argentina, Australia, and Mexico, co-signed a letter to request that their governments intervene in ending Canada's "new and harmful" 'Special Milk Class 7' mechanism by potentially entering a complaint through the WTO's Dispute Settlement System (DSS), a process which could take several years to conclude.

In 2016, before Class 7 was introduced, Canada exported less than 24,000 tonnes of skim milk powder (SMP). Although the organizations expressed concerns that as Canada moves its surplus skim milk powder onto the global market at low prices in "significant" volumes, this could distort and depress global prices, Statistic Canada reported in 2017 that Canada exported 71,880 tonnes which is valued at Can$173 million (US$133 million) and represents an increase of 47,880 tonnes over 2016. The US exports "five times more dairy to Canada than vice-versa". Agri-Food Economic Systems' research lead, Al Mussell, said "concerns about Class 7 are overblown" as Canadian SMP sales are "a drop in the bucket." Even though there was an increase in SMP exports in 2017 and 2018, that "growth cannot continue because Canada’s system restricts production". The price of Class 7 SMP was about US$0.5488 a lb. in March 2017.

=== Retail price of milk ===
In April 2018 Export Action Global report, co-authored by Adam Taylor, who was a senior advisor for Ed Fast, Minister for International Trade (2011–2015) under Stephen Harper during negotiations for the Canada-EU trade deal and the TPP, said that, "We’ve always been told this as though it’s actual, verifiable fact — that Canada has higher dairy prices because of supply management. We now know that that is factually not true." The 44-page document by Taylor and Fion Anastassiades was based on Canadian government data and the 2017 Nielsen's Fresh Milk Price Report. According to AC Nielson Fresh Milk Price Report, which compared the global retail fluid milk price per litre for 12 months ending October 2017, the price of 1 litre of liquid milk in Canadian dollars in Canada was $1.50. In Australia it was $1.57, in the USA a litre of rBST-free milk was $1.61, in France, $1.77, and in New Zealand, $1.83.

While farm gate prices are decided by SM mechanisms, other factors affect retail prices across the country. In Québec, the minimum retail price of milk had been frozen for two years by the Régie des marchés agricoles et alimentaires du Québec, which regulates all agricultural and food retail prices in Québec in general and milk in particular. In February 2018, the Régie approved an increase of about 1.2% or c. 2 cents per liter for 2018. Retailers had successfully lobbied for the price increase under the leadership of Association des détaillants en alimentation (ADA) and its CEO Florent Gravel. CTV News reported that in Québec City and Montreal consumers could pay from $1.76 ($1.34) to $1.92 (US$1.46) a litre for homo milk and from $1.56 (US$1.18) to $1.72 (US$1.31) a 1 litre of skim milk. A 2017 study by AC Nielson, a global marketing research firm, "commissioned by the Dairy Farmers of Canada, suggests that the prices Canadians pay for milk, for example, are comparable to those in many countries throughout the world, at an average retail price of around $1.30 per litre."

The monthly average retail price for a litre of milk in Canada was $2.96 in October 2023, according to Statistics Canada. In February and September 2022, the Canadian Dairy Commission (CDC) raised the farm gate price of milk. The Commission announced an additional increase which would bring the total increase to 10 cents per litre. In response to inflationary prices and political pressure at the federal level to lower food costs, the Canadian Federation of Independent Grocers (CFIG) called on the CDC to reconsider the price increase, invoking the "exceptional circumstance mechanism". The CDC has faced criticism for a lack of transparency in their process of pricing dairy products. The CDC agreed to delay the farm gate price increase until May 2024.

=== Import control ===
SM limits dairy imports through tariff-rate quotas (TRQ). Only seven per cent of all milk produced globally is exported, with ninety three per cent "consumed in the country of origin". In 2015, the three top dairy imports into the country were specialty cheeses, milk protein substance and whey products. The largest suppliers into Canada were the United States, New Zealand, France and Italy.

==== Tariff-rate quotas (TRQ) ====
A tariff-rate quota (TRQ) is an international trade policy tool that combines import quotas and tariffs. By 2013, there were approximately 1200 WTO TRQs in the agricultural sector annually among supplying countries under GATT Article XIII. TRQs are a result of the "current market access requirements" and the "minimum market access requirements" forming the basis of the "Uruguay Round country schedules for agriculture." TRQs are two-tiered tariffs in which quotas of certain sensitive domestic products are assigned a quantitative threshold or WTO "minimum access commitments" for imports during a designated time period. Tariffs for imports that are at or below the threshold, are either nonexistent or very low. Imports above the quantitative threshold, are much higher, making the cost of importation intentionally prohibitive. Once imports exceed the "minimum access commitments" as required by the World Trade Organization (WTO), which allow for imports at no or lower tariffs, in Canada imports face prohibitive tariffs such as 168% for eggs, 285% for chicken, 246% for cheese and over 300% for butter. These steep tariffs have been often cited to criticize SM for creating barriers to free trade and artificially raising prices by SM critics such as David E. Bond (2010), Andrew Coyne (2011), Hall Findlay (2012) and presidential candidate Donald Trump in 2016.

TRQs came into use after World Trade Organization (WTO)'s 1995 Uruguay Round Agreement with 123 nations as contractual parties. By 2018 the United States's quantitative TRQ threshold for the import of milk products is 3% and Canada's is 10%. By 2018, about 41 countries, including Canada and the U.S., had WTO approved tariff-rate quotas.

High TRQs are only placed on imports above the quota, not on all the dairy products sold to Canada. Below the quantitative threshold, Canadian TRQs on dairy products are often zero or less than 5%. Canada's milk quota system is butterfat-based so the highest TRQ is on butter at 298.5%. The threshold in 2005 for butter was 3,274 tonnes, of which 2,000 tonnes was allocated to New Zealand. Imports above the quota for butter would pay the steep tariff. Brookings noted that "[as] a practical matter, no dairy products are sold to Canada outside the quota, so no U.S. exports really pay a high tariff.

Prior to 1995 Canada employed agricultural import controls in use since the 1983 World Trade Organization's Agreement on Agriculture (AoA). These were converted to TRQs after 1995. By 2011, Canada's WTO-authorized TRQ represented 8% of the cheese market and 1% of the yogurt market. (Note: The same figures Coyne (2011) uses are cited in Findlay (2012:4) who is citing Hart (2005:3). "The tariff on the over quota (ranging from 168 percent for eggs, 238 percent for chicken, 246 percent for cheese, to almost 300 percent for butter) means that the prices of imports are so high that virtually no one bothers.")

The Canadian supply management system uses these TRQs to ensure that the majority of Canadian dairy and poultry are supplied by Canadian farms shielding Canadian farmers against the "heavily subsidized dairy coming into Canada". Canada has classified the dairy, poultry and egg sectors as "sensitive" and this has been accepted under WTO trading rules. It established a quota of allowable imports in these sensitive sectors of 4% to fulfill minimum access commitments at low tariffs. The allowable quota for cheese was 8% of the domestic market and 1% for yogurt. In 2009, in preparation for entry into TPP negotiations, Canada was calling for a minimum 6% TRQ threshold on designated 'sensitive' products, dairy, poultry and egg, as opposed to the existing 4% TRQ, which they said was necessary to adequately protect supply management. At that time, it was proposed "to designate 6% of tariff lines as sensitive in exchange for raising its TRQ threshold on those products – effectively allowing more foreign supply to enter the Canadian market. That proposal was not acceptable to Canada’s supply managed industries." By October 2015, Canada had agreed to open the dairy market by 3.5% while retaining the SM system.

When the U.S. under the Trump administration withdrew from TPP on January 24, 2017, the tariff-rate quotas (TRQ) on dairy products remained in effect.

In 2015, the three top dairy imports into Canada were specialty cheeses, milk protein concentrates (MPCs) and whey products. The largest suppliers into Canada were the United States, New Zealand, France and Italy.

The Business Council of Canada (BCC) reported in 2012 that, beginning in 2000, New Zealand and Australia phased out their dairy supply management programs and as a result, their dairy industries increased productivity and efficiency and became global industry leaders. Muirhead explained that from 2007 to 2014, the demand for New Zealand's milk intensified with "new consumers in China, India and Indonesia" raising the price by 50 percent.

With the supply management system, processors of dairy, poultry, and eggs benefit from predictable supply from the system, while having to pay higher prices for their inputs, which can generally be passed on to the consumer. However, this means they are at a disadvantage on the international market, because their inputs are comparatively expensive. Total dairy exports in Canada amount to only 5% of production. New Zealand by contrast, which has phased out subsidies and does not have supply management, 95% of dairy is exported. New Zealand's share in world milk markets jumped from 5.8 per cent in 1995 to 16.7 per cent in 2014. Canada's share fell from 0.9 per cent to 0.45 per cent. In 2014, New Zealand produced 21 million tonnes and Australia produced 9.5-million tonnes of milk, compared with Canada's 8.4-million tonnes. In his 2014 article University of Waterloo's Bruce Muirhead wrote that the liberalized market benefited New Zealand in terms of food exports and economy, but the price of milk for New Zealanders rose so much, a price freeze was placed in 2011 and farmers lost income.

=== Quality ===
One of the mandates of the Canadian Dairy Commission is to "ensure the quality and supply of milk". According to Hall Findlay, though the responsibility of milk is under the Canadian Food Inspection Agency to ensure proper oversight of dairy production and to guarantee that strict standards of biosecurity are upheld."

The Council of Canadians cautioned that, "Given the subsidized U.S. industrialized farming industry, allowing U.S. farms more market access [by eliminating supply management] would mean Canadian small farmers would be in competition with larger industrialized U.S. farms. The market would expand to include milk from U.S. farms that may have Bovine Growth Hormone (BGH) in it, unlike the milk here in Canada, which doesn’t allow BGH." In an August 21, 2017 article in the Globe and Mail, Martha Hall Findlay wrote that, Canada could demand milk to be hormone-free like Europe does with Canadian beef.

=== Inter-provincial restrictions ===
Critics claim the supply system has been a major barrier in free trade negotiations, including in inter-provincial trade in Canada. (Note: CPTPP is a revised version of TPP.) John Manley, former deputy prime minister of Canada, (Note: The BCC, known as the Canadian Council of Chief Executives (CCCE) until c. 2009, was first established as the Business Council on National Issues (BCNI) in 1976 and operated under that name until c.2000. Its membership includes CEOs of 150 of Canada's leading corporations. By 2016, these corporations accounted for over 50% of the value of the Toronto Stock Exchange.) criticized provincial dairy marketing boards that "control and restrict the sale of dairy products" by setting production quotas and imposing "strict limits on interprovincial shipments". However, Ontario MP John Nater, the Conservative critic for interprovincial trade, expressed concerns that changes to "marketing boards and supply management" should not be "to the detriment of farmers." In R v Comeau, a controversial Supreme Court of Canada case on the scope of free trade between the Canadian provinces, led some supporters of the supply management system to express concern that if inter-provincial conditions were removed, then it could lead to unintended consequences. The SM-5 Organizations "acting jointly" said that it "could result in the destruction of supply management — a regulatory system in place for generations, on which the livelihood of thousands of farmers across the country depends."

In a 2013 report by the George Morris Centre, the authors recommended reforms in supply-management system to align with changes in its environment related to market growth, improved efficiency, reduction in costs and liberalized pricing. To improve efficiency they suggested the elimination of the provincial "balkanization" of the dairy market and the liberalization of milk quota transfers.

== International trade agreements ==
Supply management mechanisms such as import controls were recognized as a valid practice and protected under Article XI of the 1947 General Agreement on Tariffs and Trade (GATT). During the Uruguay round of negotiations (1986-1993), Article XI was lost and tariffs were introduced to protect Canada's domestic dairy. The Canadian dairy industry was not part of trade negotiations in 1994 when the North American Free Trade Agreement (NAFTA) came into effect. As a result of Canada's forced removal of some export subsidies with the establishment of the World Trade Organization (WTO) in 1995, the federal government and the CDC updated the pricing system to be more stringent, a system that remains in place in 2018. During the 2004 WTO Doha Development Round (DDA) trade negotiations in Geneva, that had begun in 2001, Canada's supply management system was under attack by almost all their trading partners for the first time.

While supply management was one of many issues in Comprehensive Economic and Trade Agreement (CETA), a free-trade agreement between Canada, the European Union and its member states and Comprehensive and Progressive Agreement for Trans-Pacific Partnership (CPTPP) negotiations, and the United States Mexico Canada Agreement (USMCA) the system remained intact.

The United States Mexico Canada Agreement (USMCA) was reached on October 1, 2018. Under USMCA, supply management remains in place, the US was granted an expanded 3.6% market access to the domestic dairy market, similar to what it would have accessed, had the US remained in the CPP, (3.6% vs 3.25%), and Class 7 was eliminated.

In June 2025, Bill C-202 was passed by parliament, which protects supply-managed sectors in trade negotiations.

== Supply management debate ==
Supply management policies provide "stability and wealth" for "primary producers, processors, retailers and input and service providers like equipment manufacturers and financial institutions." They have been "criticized for being costly and regressive tools to transfer dollars from consumers to producers and for creating barriers to entry for young producers." Canada's trade partners say that supply management curbs market access.

In a 2014 article by Barrie McKenna, former Prime Minister, Brian Mulroney, who served as Prime Minister from 1984 to 1993 suggested during the 2014 CETA negotiations that abolishing supply management would "bolster Canada's case for concessions from the U.S. on government purchasing (Buy America), non-tariff barriers (country labelling for meat) and on agricultural export subsidies." Barrie McKenna notes that "Many Conservative MPs grumble privately about supply management. But on the record, they and members of every other federal party stand as a monolithic block in defence of the status quo." (Note: It was Mulroney's "crucial role" that led to the signing of the controversial 1989 Canada-United States Free Trade Agreement, NAFTA's precursor. In the 1980s, there was "fierce" opposition to free trade in Canada.) Apart from Bernier, the leaked binder from that Conservative MPs, David Anderson, Kevin Sorenson, Dan Albas, Alupa Clarke, Tony Clement, Tom Kmeic, Alex Nuttall and Len Webber as not being supportive towards Supply Management.

One of Prime Minister Justin Trudeau's Policy Advisors for the Minister of International Trade's Global Affairs Canada, Simon Beauchemin, had published an opinion piece in La Presse in 2014, in which he stated that Canada's supply management system disadvantaged us in the TPP negotiations particularly in relation to the US, who have been seeking greater access to the Canadian dairy and poultry market for many years. Beauchemin suggested that Canada revisit our commitment to supply management. When this was publicized in 2018, Trudeau's senior press secretary Chantal Gagnon said that Beauchemin "now fully supports the Liberal government's policy on supply management.

In its 2008 review, the Organisation for Economic Co-operation and Development (OECD) was highly critical of the supply-managed system, particularly relating to the dairy industry. In their 2017 review they again called for a phase out of the supply management system to improve Canada's export growth in 2008. Think tanks such as the Broadbent Institute, the Canadian Centre for Policy Alternatives, The Council of Canadians, and the Parkland Institute support supply management. Others, such as the C.D. Howe Institute, and the Fraser Institute, Business Council of Canada (BCC), the Canada West Foundation, (Note: Hall Findlay's 2012 report "Supply Management: Problems, Politics – And Possibilities", was criticized by the Dairy Farmers of Canada as flawed. [Findlay] cited the "Canadian price for 4 litres of milk as $9.60, which is $3 to $4 more than what most consumers paid [in 2012]...In fact, data collected by the firm Neilsen indicates the weighted average retail price of milk in Canada, is $1.45, cheaper than the $1.65 per litre in New Zealand and $1.55 per litre in Australia."; "Since 1986, Canada has concluded NAFTA and bilateral agreements with Jordan, Colombia, Peru, Costa Rica, Chile, Israel and EFTA (Switzerland, Norway, Iceland and Liechtenstein)"; "the dairy industry is a Canadian success story, present in all ten provinces and is one of the top two agricultural sectors in 7 of the 10 provinces...There was a 1% excess in world supply of milk in 2008-2009, and dairy farmers faced a 30% decrease in price. This kind of price volatility has led to government bailouts in the U.S. and Europe. In Canada, the markets for everyone in the dairy industry and consumers remained stable (Beaulieu 2012).") the Frontier Centre for Public Policy, Montreal Economic Institute (MEI), Macdonald-Laurier Institute and the Conference Board of Canada have been publishing in-depth articles since the early 2000s that are critical of supply management. A 2012 Globe and Mail commentary adds that Other countries have either eliminated or drastically reduced dairy subsidies, and taken advantage of growing global opportunities for their dairy products, while Canadian dairy farmers are limited to a smaller market.

In their most recent poll in May 2018, Ipsos commissioned by the Dairy Farmers of Canada, reported that three-quarters of Canadians "agree that the federal government should defend Canada’s dairy farmers in the NAFTA renegotiation." An April 2017 poll by Abacus Data showed that 92% of Canadians were "happy with the range and quality of dairy products available in Canada". Two-thirds of Canadians answered that they were "satisfied with prices." Only 23% said that Canada should change the rules to allow more foreign dairy products to compete with Canadian dairy to potentially lower prices and have more dairy products available. Angus Reid market research poll published on August 2, 2017 indicated that most Canadians admitted they knew "nothing at all" about the supply management system. In spite of that, 29% were committed to keeping SM in place for farmers even if the US retaliated in the 2017 NAFTA negotiations. Forty-five per cent would consider using SM in tough trade negotiations but only as a "last resort." Only twenty-six per cent would scrap SM outright.

=== Free trade vs protectionism ===
In 2010, the BCC also noted that Canada's wine industry was "shielded from foreign competition" prior to the 1988 Canada–United States Free Trade Agreement (CUSFTA). The wine industry phased out "tariff and non-tariff barriers" to free trade and "flourished". "Canadian wines are now internationally renowned. Output, exports, productivity and employment have all increased, while labour and producer incomes have doubled." (Note: The BCC registered as a lobby group in March 26, 1996. Based on the period from October 29 to January 13, 2012, the BCC submitted 578 Communication Reports to parliament with 24 in 2011. In 2011 then-MP Martha Hall Findlay was one of five Designated Public Office Holders who participated in the communications.) Findlay claimed in 2013 that the supply management system was a major barrier in free trade negotiations, including free trade with the European Union, free trade with India, and inter-provincial trade in Canada.It has not prevented these agreements from being completed. Ed Fast, MP and former federal minister of International Trade, wrote that "supply management focuses on regulating domestic production; it’s not necessarily synonymous with free trade."

The Canadian government says that "every country supports its agriculture sector in some way. Supporters state that other countries use subsidies to support their dairy farmers on the global market. However, critics have stated that Australia, New Zealand, and the United States have either eliminated or drastically reduced dairy subsidies, and taken advantage of growing global opportunities for their dairy products, which have restricted Canada dairy farmers to a small market. When Britain in the 1980s and the European Union in 2015, ended their milk quotas it resulted in overproduction and milk surpluses, the collapse or milk prices and dairy farms.

The Comprehensive Economic and Trade Agreement (CETA), a free-trade agreement between Canada, the European Union and its member states was provisionally applied in 2017. The federal government relaxed its supply-management system, agreeing to tariff rate quotes for 18 million kilograms of annual cheese imports. The EU pursued increased access to the Canadian cheese market and requested that provincial representatives, particularly Québec and Ontario, who are specifically concerned by potential challenges to the supply management system. The increase which nearly doubles the amount of duty-free EU cheese imports duty-free, is the first time it has raised the cheese quota since the 1970s.

In March 2018, Canada signed its most recent trade agreement, the Comprehensive and Progressive Agreement for Trans-Pacific Partnership (CPTPP), which includes ten countries. In 2011, Australia and New Zealand moved to exclude Canada from participation in the TPP trade negotiations because of its Supply management system. Once Canada agreed to negotiate on the supply management system, Canada was invited to fully participate in the TPP negotiations, but faced protests from supply management supporters.The TPP only managed to open 3.25 percent for dairy, 2.3 percent for eggs, 2.1 percent for chicken, 2 percent for turkey, and 1.5 percent for broiler hatching eggs in market access.

Supply management was one of many issues in negotiations such as the re-negotiation of NAFTA in 2018, Some American farmers such as the Wisconsin Farmers Union, the National Family Farm Coalition and Institute for Agricultural & Trade Policy and others, would leave the Canadian system alone instead of fighting it as expected. In its June 2017 report on Canada, the Organisation for Economic Co-operation and Development (OECD) projected that Canada's export growth could generally decrease with NAFTA re-negotiations but "renegotiation of trade agreements could boost inclusive growth if it led to a phasing-out of Canadian dairy supply management policies." Wheat and barley farmers in the Prairies and particularly in Alberta raised similar concerns about the talks.

In the context of NAFTA talks, Jean Charest has suggested scrapping Supply Management in exchange for the United States scrapping their farm subsidies. Stanely Hartt argued that if supply management was ended new co-operatives, like Agropur, could emerge providing ownership interests and employment to the owners of small farms dedicated to those product lines and, with proper adjustment programs, the resulting growth would increase our prosperity and standard of living.

=== Farmers ===
Supporters said that supply management is effective at keeping revenue stable for farmers. For this reason, farmers lobby to protect supply management from any challenges, both domestic and international. Supporters have stated that supply management protects farmers but critics say that there are other ways for the government to impact farmers without removing supply management, such as changing Canada's Food Guide to shift from a dairy-based diet to a plant-based diet. According to a 2015 Boston Consulting Group study, New Zealand's production costs are half those of North American dairy farmers whose cattle spend most of their lives indoors, because New Zealand's "free-roaming", "grass-eating cows" live outdoors year-round. Critics state that New York and Wisconsin have colder climates than Canada and their industries are thriving without supply management. Supporters of supply management say that it protects customers from US milk produced by cattle injected with growth hormones that enables United States dairy farms to be more productive than those in Canada. John Barber, a supporter says that family farms in Canada that milk an average of 80 cows a day.

Critics say that the state of Washington (whose own cows are rbST-Free) produces 10,800 kilograms (23,800 lb) milk per year per cow compared to Wisconsin (which permits the use of hormones) at 10,000 kilograms (22,000 lb) per cow. Canada produces 8,500 kilograms (18,700 lb) of milk per year per cow. (Note: According to the Canadian Dairy Commission (CDC), "The overall number of cows has decreased over the past 5 years, however the production per cow has increased by 9.7%. In 2011, there were 965,600 cows in Canada producing an average of 80.5 hl of milk per cow. In 2016, there were approximately 959,100 dairy cows in Canada, producing an average of 88.3 hl of milk per cow.")

Taxpayers do not pay direct subsidies to supply-managed industry products, such as dairy, poultry and egg farmers. Agricultural subsidies are common in many developed countries. The majority of Canadian farmers in sectors that are not supply-managed, including grain, beef, pork, food oils and pulses, receive few if any subsidies. The OECD estimated the subsidy equivalent in 2012 (producer support estimate) in all Canadian agriculture represented 18% of the value of the industry with most of this amount going to supply managed sectors which represent only a percentage of Canadian agriculture. Critics say that this results in a "much higher effective subsidy" for supply-managed industries. According to Hall Findlay's 2012 study, in the European Union, the effective subsidies were 27%, with the United States at 10%, Australia (6%), New Zealand (1%), Brazil (6%), and China at 9%.

=== Legal principles ===
Calgary-based lawyer, Michael Osborne wrote in a July 2018 Financial Post article that "Supply management may be lawful, but it is undoubtedly an equal assault on the market...The only difference between supply management and price-fixing cartels is the web of federal and provincial laws that support the first and make the second a criminal offence." Osborne cited the example of a 2012 decision on auto parts price-fixing by Federal Court Judge Paul Crampton in which Crampton described price-fixing cartels, in general, as "an assault on our open-market economy."

Critics such as the Frontier Centre for Public Policy's Eric Merkley, Canada West Foundation's Martha Hall Findlay, Bloomberg's Stephen Mihm, and Maxime Bernier have described SM as a "cartel". Jonathan Kay called it a "milk racket." Bernier explained in his chapter that “The word cartel applies to a system, not to individuals, and it doesn’t necessarily describe criminal behaviour,”

Articles in and the Globe and Mail in 2017 and in the Toronto Star in 2018 compared supply management to the bread price-fixing in Canada scandal. The Star editors wrote that consumers are "penalized through the absolutely legal, indeed highly valued, practice of supply management."

=== Protecting farms ===
Proponents of supply management claim that it is effective at keeping small family farms viable instead of having them crowded out by large factory farms. The number of dairy farms decreased from 500,000 just after WWII to 18,500 in 2005. According to Hall Findlay, the numbers continued to decrease from 135,000 in 1971 to 13,000 in 2011, representing a 91 percent loss. The number of chicken farms has declined 88 percent; while in the same period of time in the United States, the number of dairy farms dropped by 88 percent. Supply-managed farms represent 8% to 13% of all farms in the country.

Hall Findlay says that even with supply management, "[t]here has been more consolidation in dairy, poultry and eggs than in almost every other agricultural sector". (Note: This is Part 1 of a series of three, Part 2: "Why the dairy industry’s defence of supply management is so flawed", Part 3: How to scrap supply management—a lesson from down under) Supporters, such as the Broadbent Institute, say that the supply management system "allows Canada a degree of food security and food sovereignty that is remarkable". The "global dairy is in the throes of a massive downturn, which has created havoc everywhere" except Canada. Without the stability of the supply management system, farmers could lose their livelihood while "consumers do not necessarily benefit from lower prices given the activities of supermarkets (and others) to keep prices as high as possible." Though Hall Findlay has stated hypocritical to support supply management and claim to support "progressive, "social justice" values. In her 2014 Maclean's article Hall Findlay wrote that the "average dairy farm’s net worth was well more than $2.5 million" in 2010 and "the average poultry/egg farm’s net worth was almost $4 million—far more than all other Canadian farmers, and far, far more than the average Canadian family."

=== Lobbying ===
One of the lobby groups that oppose the supply management system as an impediment to the pursuit of "reciprocal trade and investment liberalization" is the Business Council of Canada (BCC)—Canadian Council of Chief Executives (CCCE)— a registered lobbyist on Canadian public policy. Since at least 2012, when Harper announced his intention to enter into TPP trade talks, the former Liberal deputy prime minister John Manley as BCC CEO, has led the call for review and reform of Canada's supply management system to increase productivity, exports, and employment.

The Canadian Dairy Commission (CDC), a Crown corporation composed mainly of dairy farmers, and its analogue for eggs, chicken and turkey products, the Farm Products Council of Canada, are just some of the organizations that defend supply management. DFC partners who publish articles in support of supply management include the Canadian Federation of Agriculture, the GO5, Coalition for a Fair Farming Model, Supply Management, FarmGate5, and the five national marketing agencies that administer or support agricultural supply management systems, known jointly as the SM-5 Organizations, such as, Dairy Farmers of Canada (DFC), Egg Farmers of Canada (EFC), Turkey Farmers of Canada (TFC), Chicken Farmers of Canada (CFC) Canadian Hatching Egg Producers (CHEP) support the system. Other supporters include Québec Federation of Milk Producers, and the Union of Agricultural Producers (UPA) that represent dairy farmers and turn up at protests. In March 2018, the Wisconsin Farmers Union (WFU) hosted events for Wisconsin dairy farmers and lawmakers in five Wisconsin cities in which Dairy Farmers of Ontario (DFO) representatives explained Canada's dairy supply management system. At the end of the presentation, by a show of hands 70 to 80% of participants indicated that there were elements of Canada's SM "that would make sense in the U.S." When asked if they believed Canada caused the "challenges dairy farmers in the U.S. [were] experiencing, there were "no hands raised at any of the five meetings." Hall Findlay described the dairy lobby as a small group with out-sized power, that pose a threat to the political careers of those who oppose SM.

The Dairy Farmers of America (DFA), the largest cooperative of milk-producers in the United States, representing 14,000 farmers, faced with the increasing number of dairy farm bankruptcies, low milk prices, voted at their annual meeting in March 2018, to look into Canada's supply management system.

Agropur, which is one of three milk processors in Canada that control 80% of production−the others are Montreal-based Saputo Inc and Parmalat Canada−defends the system, "both in the public arena and with various levels of government". In preparation for TPP negotiations, Agropur had commissioned the Boston Consulting Group to produce the 2015 report, "Analysis of the potential impacts of the end of supply management on the Canadian dairy industry", and distributed it widely, which they said, "had a significant impact on decision makers and the media alike." The report estimated that a complete and abrupt abolition of supply management would put 40% of Canadian dairy production at risk, resulting in the loss of about 5,000 dairy farms. "Agropur Cooperative and Saputo Inc., have expanded into the U.S. or even Brazil to boost revenues."

Dairy farmers have greater political influence because "[as] producers, [they] are very involved in [their] regional economy and regional politics. Each producer has more impact than the average voter, because [they] buy supplies from local companies, [they] sell to local processors, [they] are at the base of the regional economy." Dairy farmers have been major players in international trade talks such as NAFTA and TPP talks. In 2015, during TPP negotiations, dairy farmers and their cows "converged on Parliament Hill to protest the mere possibility that supply management would be significantly affected by TPP negotiations."

A 2015 Maclean's article, "Why the dairy lobby is so powerful", described an incident during the September 28, 2015 federal leaders Munk Debate on foreign affairs, then-NDP Leader Tom Mulcair asked Stephen Harper if they could assure the Union des producteurs agricoles du Québec (UPA) President Marcel Groleau, reached out to the New Democrats, Liberals and Bloc Québécois, of his full support for supply management. Harper immediately complied. In his 2018 on-line political memoir, Maxime Bernier grouped together supporters of supply-managed sectors under a combined dairy lobby. Bernier described the UPA as an "extension" of Québec's Ministry of Agriculture, Fisheries and Food. He wrote that the combined dairy lobby funds millions of dollars in university graduate programs and research on "collective marketing of agricultural products" across the country in support of SM policies.

According to the Federal lobbyist registry, from January to September 2012, the Chicken Farmers of Canada had 92 contacts with federal officials making it on the list of top ten lobby groups with the most contacts that year. They lobbied on poultry import tariffs, medicated feed mixing regulations, meat inspection regulations and food safety programs.

=== Dairy industry-related jobs ===
According to their 2015 Boston Consulting Group comprehensive report, there are about 12,000 dairy farms in Canada that produce about 8 billion litres of milk annually which is sent for "treatment and processing to approximately 450 dairy plants". Critics state supply management can be used to deter manufacturing jobs away from Canada. In 2010, 22,650 people were employed in the dairy processing sector. Critics state that number could be, and should be, much higher.

Another study stated an estimate for dairy input "costs of Canadian manufacturers, which produce everything from frozen pizza to ready-made lasagna, to be between five and 30 percent higher than those of U.S. companies."

In 2017, the Chinese corporation, Feihe International, invested $225 million to construct an infant formula plant in Kingston, Ontario in 2017, citing one of the main reasons for choosing Canada, was the supply management system though it was mainly for the quality of milk. (Note: Feihe chose Canada instead of New Zealand, despite its proximity, because of the bad press surrounding New Zealand's Fonterra, which owned a 43% stake in Sanlu, the company whose product poisoned hundreds of thousands of babies in the melamine scandal in 2008. As a result Chinese consumers no longer trust milk from New Zealand.) In 2013, Chobani, a yogurt maker from the US, abandoned plans to build a $76 million plant in Kingston, which would have created 1,300 direct and indirect jobs based on quota limitation.

Critics state that the high cost associated with supply management had led to Canada's food processing industry bleeding "market share to U.S. competitors and several major companies such as Campbell Soup Co, Kraft Heinz Co., and Kellogg Co. closing Canadian plants in recent years." In addition, they state that dairy processors establish operations outside the country to meet global demand due saturation in the Canadian market caused by the tariffs.

==== Butter 2015 crisis ====
Postmedia columnist Joe Childley wrote in his November 2017 article in the Financial Post that the butter crisis in France, was an "object lesson" in the limitations of Canada's SM system. In March 2017, the Wisconsin Agriculturist reported that butter consumption in the United States was increasing and was nearing a fifty-year record high which was pushing the price of butter higher. Europe also experienced a butter shortage; however throughout this time period, Canada saw no immediate impact on butter pricing or availability. Many view this as a positive result in properly executed SM.

In Canada, starting in 2015 there was also an "unprecedented" demand for butter (and cream) in Canada resulting in a brief but "severe butter shortage" that some blamed on supply management Regardless of this event seeing no rise in consumer or commercial butter pricing in Canada, nor did it result in any increase in unavailability of butter at retail outlets, or for commercial consumers. Provincial marketing boards raised their milk quotas to respond to demand. By April 2017, there was enough growth in the Canadian domestic butterfat output to meet demand.

=== Consumers ===
Supply management limits the production of dairy product in Canada, and imposes tariffs on imports. The direct consequence of these policies is to increase the retail prices of dairy products. According to the Conference Board of Canada's March 2014 report, "Canada's Reforming Dairy Supply Management: The Case for Growth", Canadian households paid on average about $276 more annually than those from other countries for dairy products because of SM. According to the CPP 2015 article "Milked and Feathered", the average cost for Canadian households was $444 annually based on StatsCan's 2001 data. The OECD estimated that the consumer support estimate (CSE) from 2001 to 2011 represented about $2.6 billion annually. Based on a rough estimate of 9.4 million households in 2011, this represented about $276 per household annually.

Hall Findlay has been saying since 2012 that Canadian consumers pay one and a half to three times as much for dairy, poultry and eggs than they otherwise would without the supply management system, or pay up to around Can$450/year per household and $600/year for households with children. This has been criticized as a regressive tax on the poor (around 37 cents per litre), for whom food is a large portion of their budget, and who are in effect subsidizing well-off farmers.

In addition, a study pointed out that supply management was costing Canadian consumers $2.6 billion per year (compare to supply management dairy product bringing in $970 Million into the economy). The study stated that supply management impacts the poorest households five times (2.4% of income or almost 25% of income on food) more than wealthy families (0.5% of income or almost 6% of income on food) in relative household income, while another study point to that around 133,032 to 189,278 Canadians (or 67,000 to 79,000 households) are pushed into poverty due to burden of SM.

A 2018 report based on government data and the 2017 Nielsen's Fresh Milk Price Report, showed that although it has been claimed that Canadians pay higher dairy prices than other countries, this is only partially correct. The price of 1 litre of liquid milk in Canadian dollars in Canada for the 12 months ending October 2017 was $1.50, less than in Australia ($1.57), the US ($1.61 per litre of rBST-free milk), France ($1.77), and New Zealand ($1.83), but more than in South Africa ($1.23), Germany ($1.23), Mexico ($1.00), and Britain ($0.99).

=== Farmers not covered by supply management ===
Canadians farm products that are not supply managed do as well as their American or European competitors, who receive more support from their government. Nearly 60% of Canada's agricultural and agri-food production is bound for foreign markets, with nearly half of this going to the U.S. market. Hall Findlay wrote that "other agricultural sectors in Canada (grain, beef, pork, etc.) do not have similar controls or subsidies, and for the most part compete as a normal product on the international market.

Montreal Economic Institute's public policy analyst, Alexandre Moreau, said that Canadian farmers who are not under SM would "pay the price" if President Trump is unable to deliver on his 2017 promise related to NAFTA re-negotiations, to increase "market access to U.S. dairy farmers" in a direct "aim at Canada's supply management." Wheat farmer Kevin Auch, former chair of the Alberta Wheat Commission does not want the 90% of Canadian farmers who are not under SM to put at risk to preserve SM for the 10% who are. In other sectors of agriculture. There are ten times more farmers that benefit from increased trade.

In a 2015 anti-SM article by the Ottawa-based Centre for International Policy Studies' Alan Freeman described SM as a "bizarre system of agricultural market protection that seems to have been lifted from a five-year economic plan in 1950s Communist Romania". Freeman cited the University of Guelph’s Food Institute's Sylvain Charlebois, who is also a "trenchant" SM critic, saying Canadian dairy farmers under SM are not as productive as their American counterparts and it costs them twice as much to produce milk as it does in the United States. Canada's supply management forces Canada, Canadian farmers, and Canadians to give up billions in GDP, exports, prosperity, jobs, and tax revenue.

== See also ==
- Agriculture in Canada
- Canadian Dairy Commission
- Dairy farming in Canada
