= Dairy Farmers =

Dairy Farmers may refer to various companies, brand names, co-operatives or trade unions:

- Dairy Farmers, Inc - United States
- Dairy Farmers Pty Ltd - Australia
- Dairy Farmers of America
- Dairy Farmers of Britain
- Dairy Farmers of Canada
- Dairy Farmers of Ontario

== See also ==
- Dairy farming
- Dairy Farmers Stadium
