= Dairy farming in Canada =

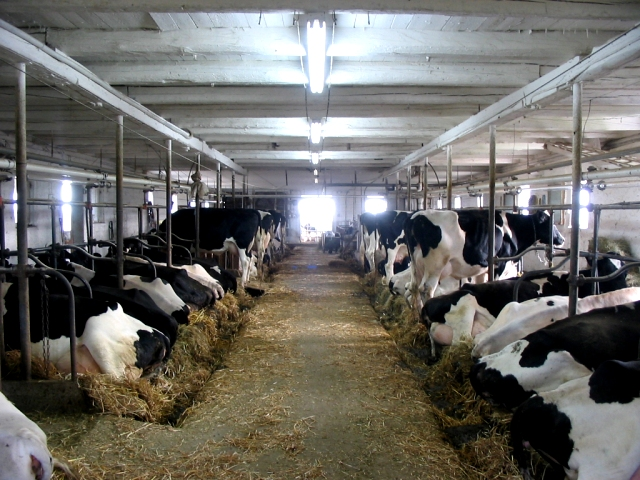
Dairy cattle in a barn in Quebec

Dairy farming is one of the largest agricultural sectors in Canada. Dairy has a significant presence in all of the provinces and is one of the top two agricultural commodities in seven out of ten provinces.

In 2018, there were 967,700 dairy cows on 10,679 farms across the country. Quebec and Ontario are the major dairy producing provinces, with 5,120 and 3,534 farms, which produce 37% and 33% of Canada's total milk. This is supposed to represent 8% of farmers in Canada. While dairy farming is still prominent in Canadian society, the number of dairy farms in Canada has been dropping significantly since 1971 while the size of the average farm has significantly increased to 89 cows per farm.

The Canadian dairy sector contributes approximately $19.9 billion yearly to Canada's GDP, and sustains approximately 221,000 full-time equivalent jobs and generates $3.8 billion in tax revenues. On average, two-thirds of Canadian dairy produced is sold as fluid milk while the remaining one-third is refined into other dairy products such as milk, cheese and butter.

In Canada, dairy farming is subject to the system of supply management. Under supply management, which also includes the egg and poultry sectors, farmers manage their production so that it coincides with forecasts of demand for their products over a predetermined period – while taking into account certain imports that enter Canada, as well as some production which is shipped to export markets. Imports of dairy, eggs, and poultry are controlled using tariff rate quotas, or TRQs. These allow a predetermined quantity to be imported at preferential tariff rates (generally duty free), while maintaining control over how much is imported. The over-quota tariffs are set at levels where practically no dairy products are sold to Canada above the quotas. That should allow Canadian farmers to receive a price reflecting the cost to produce in the country.

There has been pushback regarding the supply management system, and research indicates that the Canadian population generally have varied views with the current system. The Dairy Farmers of Canada, a dairy advocacy group, claims that the system is necessary for farmers to provide quality milk to consumers.

== History ==
The Canadian Dairy Farmers' Federation was founded in 1934. The group became Dairy Farmers of Canada in 1942, and its mandate was to stabilize the dairy market and increase revenues for dairy farmers. In the face of lobbying, government programs were instituted in the 1940s and 1950s to increase prices and limit imports. 1958 saw the creation of the Agricultural Stabilization Board, though it was not limited to dairy. In the 1950s and 1960s there was significant volatility in dairy prices; dairy producers were seen as having too much bargaining power relative to dairy farmers, and the United Kingdom was poised to enter the European Common Market, resulting in the loss of Canada's largest dairy export partner. These challenges led to the creation of the Canadian Dairy Commission, whose mandate was to ensure the quality and supply of milk, that producers received a "fair" return on investment, and set prices based on production costs, market price, consumer's ability to pay, and current economic conditions.

=== 2021 "Buttergate" ===
In 2021, Canadian dairy received national and international attention due to an alleged change in texture of Canadian butter. Consumers also claimed that the butter was not softening at room temperature. Dubbed Buttergate, the controversy began with a column in the Globe and Mail, asserting that among other factors, that the use of palmitic oil, derived from palm oil, as a feed supplement was causing the change in texture of butter. Demand for butter in Canada increased during the COVID-19 pandemic, and farmers were supposedly using palmitic oil to increase yields. A wider discussion was sparked about dairy in Canada, with strong opinions about the use of palmitic oil from some such as Professor Sylvain Charlebois of Dalhousie University. While some academics and scientists rejected the palmitic oil claims due to a lack of hard evidence, subsequent studies did provide new evidence palmitic acids can make butter harder at room temperature.

== Statistics ==
=== Snapshot of the Canadian dairy industry ===
"Dairy industry by province, 2015 (Dairy cow and calf slaughter is included in meat production statistics)
Province	Number of Dairy Farms	Number of Dairy Cows	Production (hectolitres)	Dairy Cows per Farm	Production (hectolitres) per Farm
British Columbia	437	75,100	7,221,505	172	16,525
Alberta	547	77,900	7,015,384	142	12,825
Saskatchewan	163	27,100	2,426,736	166	14,888
Manitoba	299	44,700	3,450,720	150	11,540
Ontario	3,834	318,700	26,921,164	83	7,022
Quebec	5,766	354,100	30,016,781	61	5,206
New Brunswick	354	18,500	1,394,496	90	6,769
Nova Scotia	225	23,200	1,804,153	103	8,019
Prince Edward Island	174	14,300	1,032,523	82	5,934
Newfoundland & Labrador	32	6,000	483,413	188	15,107
CANADA	11,683	959,600	81,766,876	82	6,999

== Supply management ==
The government of Canada put in place a supply management system during the early 1970s as an effort to reduce the surplus in production that had become common in the 1950s and 1960s and to ensure a fair return for farmers. Supply management is a shared jurisdiction between the federal and provincial governments. The Canadian Dairy Commission provides a framework for dairy policy at the federal level, while provinces have their own marketing board organizations, such as Ontario's Dairy Farmers of Ontario.

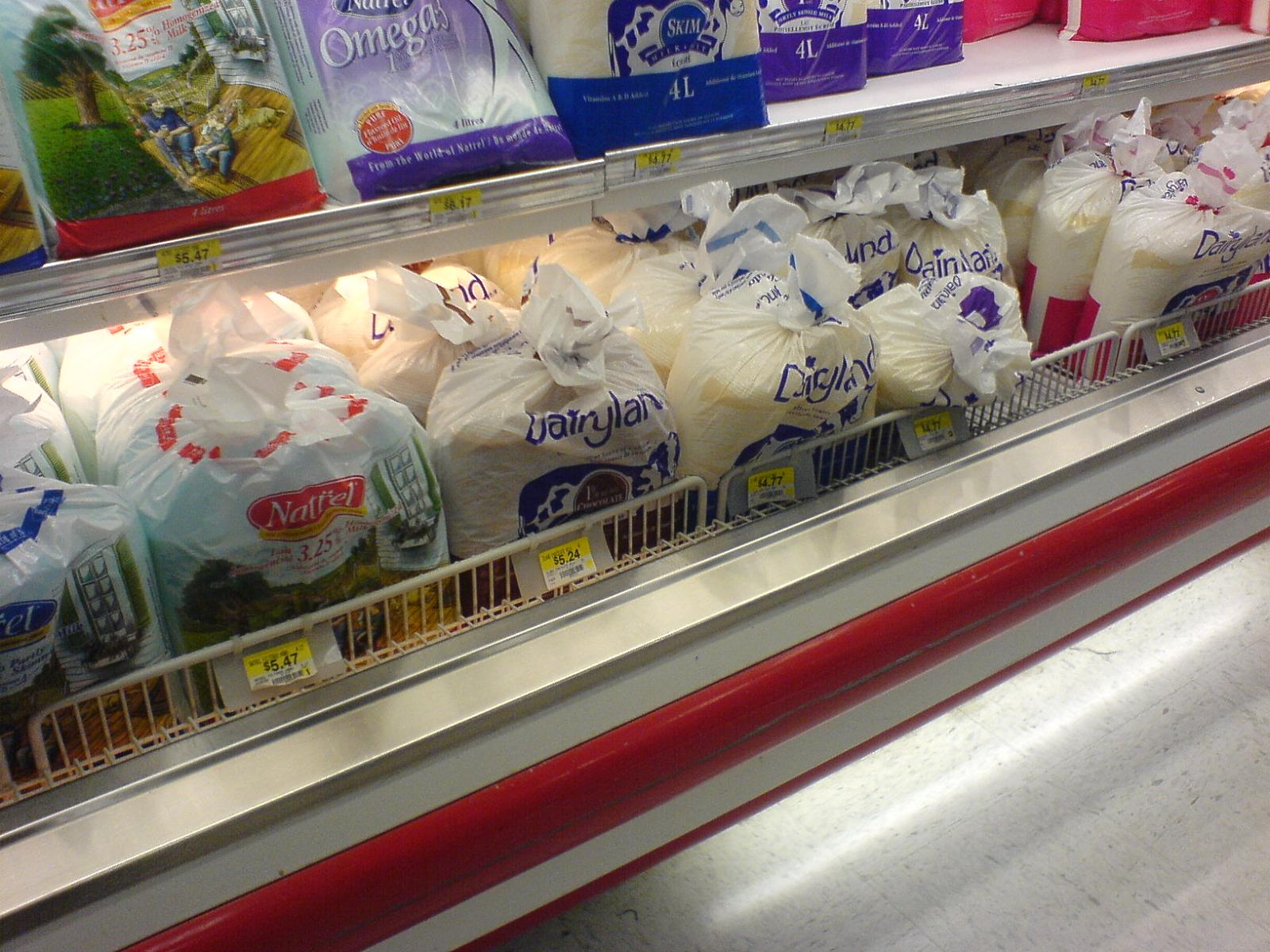
Milk for sale in a supermarket in London, Ontario.

In 1983, the National Milk Marketing Plan came into effect to control supply, setting guidelines for calculating Market Sharing Quota. This agreement is between the federal and provincial powers. The Milk Marketing Plan was created to replace the Comprehensive Milk Marketing Agreement, which was initially established in 1971. By 1983, every province except Newfoundland had signed onto the Milk Marketing Agreement. Following dairy, a national supply management system was implemented for eggs in 1972, turkey in 1974, chicken in 1978 and chicken hatching eggs in 1986.

Supply management attempts to manage production so that supply is in balance with demand, and the farm gate price enables farmers to cover their costs of production, including a return on labour and capital. Each farm owns a number of shares in the market (quota), and is required to increase or decrease production according to consumer demand. Because production is in sync with demand, farmers avoid overproduction and earn a predictable and stable revenue, directly from the market.

Canada's supply management system for dairy products benefits Canadian dairy farmers. The consequence of such a system is artificially higher dairy prices in Canada, which may be the reason that some individuals are consuming fewer dairy products in favour of alternative products, such as almond or soy milk.

There is concern regarding the impact that supply management has on political influence, given that the number of dairy farmers in Canada has been significantly dropping since 1971 leading to what some have described as a disproportionate ratio of dairy farmers to other types of farmers in Canada, with some viewing those fewer dairy farmers as working to consolidate their political influence. These groups also argue that if the system were to be abolished, there would be an increase in food manufacturing, a reduction in food waste, a reduction in poverty, and it could prevent future food shortages. In addition, critics argue that the Canadian dairy system does not allow Canadian dairy farmers to participate in the global dairy market, which limits the possible growth of their businesses and goes against Canada's stated commitment to free trade.

== Regulations ==
Canadian dairy farmers follow regulations outlined by the Canadian Food Inspection Agency to ensure proper oversight of dairy production to ensure biosecurity standards are maintained in the sectors of environmental protection, human health, animal health, and animal welfare. CFIA biosecurity standards are voluntary. In adhering to these regulations, dairy farmers can make certain that dairy standards are sustained. Under the 2015 TPP negotiations it was revealed that Health Canada had not found evidence of adverse health effects in humans from the consumption of recombinant bovine somatotrophin (rBST) growth hormone products. Without a labeling requirement, if Canadians chose to only consume Canadian dairy products in order to avoid consuming rBST, there would be no way of knowing the origins of milk ingredients. Processed food sold in Canada could contain ingredients from cows from the U.S. that were treated with rBST.

== Animal Welfare ==
The main welfare issues regarding Canadian dairy production include the immediate separation of calves from their mothers (called cow-calf separation), the isolation and confinement of male calves, various painful invasive procedures, lameness, confined living conditions, rough handling practices, stressful transportation environments, pre-slaughter conditions, and the slaughter itself.

A 2018 review of Canadian dairy farms found that many dairy cows intended to be slaughtered, known as cull dairy cows, are transported to widely dispersed and specialized slaughter plants, and they may experience multiple handling events (e.g., loading, unloading, mixing), change of ownership among dealers, and feed and water deprivation during transport and at livestock markets.

According to the Canadian Veterinary Welfare Association, dairy cows that are considered to be of low or reduced economic value are removed (culled) from the herd for a variety of reasons including reproductive issues (e.g., fertility), low milk production, mastitis, lameness, and other forms of ill-health. Cull dairy cows may be in poor condition and as such may be at greater risk of suffering during standard transport and slaughter.

The Canadian dairy industry is often criticized by animal rights and animal welfare groups, such as the Society for the Prevention of Cruelty to Animals, Canadians for the Ethical Treatment of Animals, Mercy for Animals, and Humane Canada.

Alberta Milk, an industry advocacy group, argues that the separation of calves from their mothers is not unethical because quickly separating calves results in a much smaller risk of sickness and the mother quickly forgets about her child. However, a 2019 review found no consistent evidence in support of early separation for cow and calf health, and a 2008 review states that early weaning causes distress to both cow and calf.

The Ontario Ministry of Agriculture is currently in favour of dehorning and disbudding, stating that it provides economic benefits and increases safety. It also takes the position that dehorning and disbudding without anaesthesia is inhumane and unethical, but there is no requirement for anaesthesia use under the Ontario Society for the Prevention of Cruelty to Animals Act. No dairy industry practices are prohibited in the Criminal Code of Canada, including painful invasive procedures done without the use of painkillers. A 2007 review stated that dehorning and similar mutilations are not necessary for safety.

"ProAction" is a program started in 2010 by the Dairy Farmers of Canada, an industry governing body. It is a mandatory program which regulates farm practices regarding a wide range of food safety, environmental concerns, and animal welfare concerns, including anaesthesia, euthanasia, tail docking, animal handling, and animal hygiene. Continued non-compliance results in progressive penalties, such as fines, and eventually results in suspension of milk pickup

== Environmental impact ==
The Canadian dairy industry is responsible for 20% of total green house gas (GHG) emissions generated in Canada by livestock agriculture, which is made up of the dairy, poultry, swine and beef industry. 90% of the GHG emissions caused by Canadian dairy farming occurs as a result of events on the farm, whereas only 10% GHG emissions are emitted as a result of off farm processes such as the producing and refining processes. The greatest amount of GHG that is produced by Canadian dairy cows occurs at the time of lactation.

GHG emissions from dairy farms in Western Canada are typically lower than in Eastern Canada, primarily as a function of climate and raw milk production processes in comparison to the climate and milk production processes utilized in Eastern Canada. Consequently, the Eastern provinces of Canada contribute to 78.5% of GHG emissions created by the Canadian dairy farming industry.

=== Feed sources and greenhouse gas emissions ===
The type of feed utilized by Canadian dairy farmers significantly affects the amount of GHG emissions as a result of dairy production. Canadian dairy farmers commonly feed their cattle corn or barley silage as high nutrient food sources to increase milk production. Although corn and barley are both efficient and economic sources of feed, these two feed sources are responsible for large amounts of greenhouse gas (GHG) emission in Canada. While both of these types of feed contribute to significant amounts of GHG, research reveals that corn produces lower amounts of GHG in comparison to barley. In examining the use of these two types of feed, comparison of measurements of CH_{4}, N_{2}O and CO_{2} suggests that total GHG emission in Canada produced by a single cow based on amount of milk production is 13% lower when the cow is fed corn compared to barley. Additionally, corn silage feed is attributed to higher milk production across dairy cows compared to barley silage feed.

Despite the decrease in GHG in utilizing corn feed for Canadian dairy farms, when examining processing and transportation costs of feed for Canadian dairy farms, corn silage production is responsible for a 9% increase in CO_{2} compared to the processing and transportation costs associated with barley silage production. Despite higher rates of GHG due to transportation costs, Corn still results in lower rates of GHG overall.

While corn and barley are two commonly used types of feed by Canadian dairy farmers, the feed source of the forage, alfalfa, while less commonly used is a feed source that would further decrease GHG emissions, in comparison to corn.

== Total Mixed Ration ==
Most dairy farms in Canada feed what is called a Total Mixed Ration (TMR). It is the act of combining a variety of feed stuffs into a large mixture that is mixed well and then fed to the cows. These rations vary among farms based on the farms goals and available feed sources. The goal of a TMR is to make every bite a cow eats the exact same so their feed intake can monitored and adjusted accordingly. TMR pose many advantages to the cows health such as increased rumen activity which leads to less acid build up and in turn more feed absorption which leads to higher milk production.

== Organic farming ==
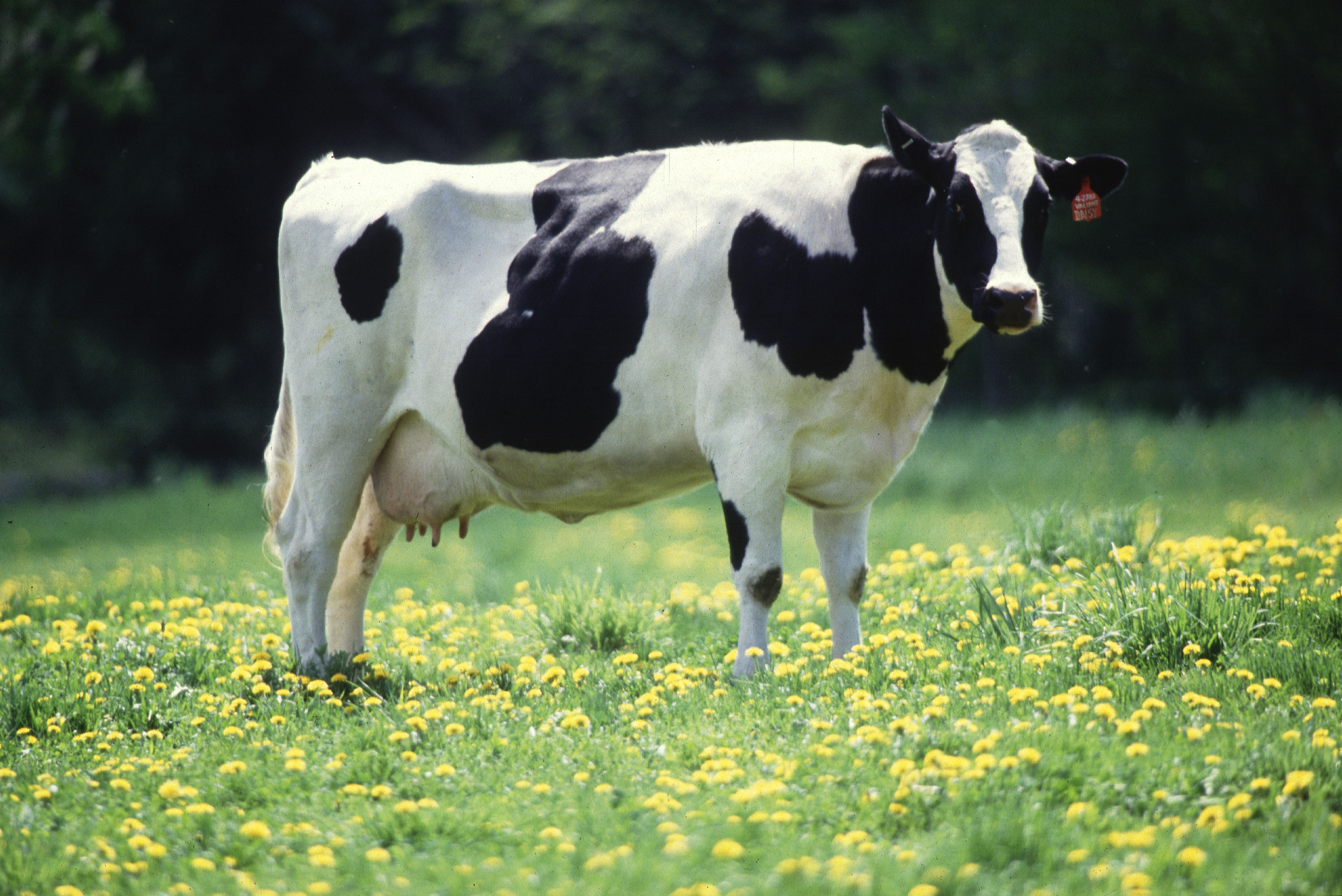
Dairy cow

Costs associated with organic farming are substantially lower than costs incurred by conventional farming. Organic Canadian dairy farms have been shown to have a lower overall cost of production and are more self-sufficient in terms of plant and animal nutrient recycling and restocking of livestock herds. In contrast, the larger economic surplus enjoyed by conventional dairy farms in Canada is often offset by extra costs associated with importing fertilizers, seed, and replacement cattle, making conventional farming no more economically profitable than organic farming.

Both organic and conventional dairy farms exist across Canada. Conventional farming is widely perceived as being the more modern and economically successful method of dairy farming in Canada. Organic dairy farming in Canada is far less prevalent primarily due to widely held misconceptions that organic farming is unprofitable and risky, as organic farming is attributed to a significant degree of self-sufficiency for all aspects of production. Conventional farming is perceived as being highly advanced technologically, utilizing efficient fertilizers and automated processes throughout the farm, driving down costs associated with physical labour.

== See also ==
- Agriculture in Canada
- Canadian Dairy Commission
- Cheese in Canada
- Supply management (Canada)
