= Farm Products Council of Canada =

The Farm Products Council of Canada (formerly the National Farm Products Council) is a Canadian government agency established in 1972 that is responsible for promoting efficient and competitive agriculture. It oversees the national Supply Management agencies for eggs, poultry, and chicken. It is thus the analogue of the Canadian Dairy Commission for those products. The Council reports to Parliament through the Minister of Agriculture and Agri-Food.

The FPCC is responsible for administering two federal laws, the Farm Products Agencies Act (FPAA) and the Agricultural Products Marketing Act (APMA). It helps to improve farm-product marketing between the provinces and territories and internationally.

The Council supervises the operations of the Egg Farmers of Canada, Turkey Farmers of Canada, Chicken Farmers of Canada, Canada Hatching Egg Producers, as well as the Canadian Beef Check-Off Agency and the Canadian Pork Promotion and Research Agency.

== Aim and Vision ==
FPCC aims to provide Canadians with safe supply management system and monitor agricultural product market behaviours.
