= Dairy Farmers of Ontario =

Canadian provincial milk regulatory body

Dairy Farmers of Ontario (DFO)
- Abbreviation: DFO
- Headquarters: Mississauga, Ontario
- Chair: Mark Hamel
- Vice-Chair: John Wynands
- 2nd Vice-Chair: Brian Burnett
- CEO: Cheryl Smith
- Website: www.milk.org
- Formerly called: Ontario Milk Marketing Board (OMMB)

Dairy Farmers of Ontario (DFO), is the marketing organization and regulatory body representing over 3,100 dairy farms and more than 10,000 dairy farmers and their families in Ontario, Canada. DFO was formerly known as the Ontario Milk Marketing Board (OMMB), which was established as result of the 1965 Ontario Milk Act. On August 1, 1995, the Ontario Milk Marketing Board and the Ontario Cream Producers' Marketing Board merged to form Dairy Farmers of Ontario.

== Administration ==
The DFO management includes Mark Hamel as chair, John Wynands as vice-chair, Brian Burnett as 2nd vice-chair, and Cheryl Smith, chief executive officer.

== History ==
The Dairy Farmers of Ontario was established in 1965 as regulatory organization, which derives its authority from the 1965 Ontario Milk Act. The Milk Act was passed in response to milk market inefficiencies and inequities in the 1960s. The Ontario provincial government 1963 commissioned study called for the creation of the Ontario Milk Marketing Board (OMMB) in Guelph, Ontario, an intermediate body to purchase all milk produced on Ontario farms and to sell it to milk processors. From the time of its inception in 1965 until 1995, Dairy Farmers of Ontario was known as Ontario Milk Marketing Board.

== Mandate ==
DFO administers the raw cow milk quality program under the auspices of the Ontario Ministry of Agriculture, Food and Rural Affairs (OMAFA), which licenses all dairy farms under the Ontario Milk Act. The Ontario Farm Products Marketing Commission delegates authority to all marketing boards, including DFO. DFO has the authority to set the price of milk, based on its end use. DFO sets most prices based on those established at the national level by the Canadian Milk Supply Management Committee (CMSMC).

== Supply management ==
In Canada, the dairy industry, along with the chicken, turkey, egg and broiler hatching egg industries, operate under national supply management systems. In March 2018, the Wisconsin Farmers Union (WFU) hosted events in Eau Claire, Edgar, Fond du Lac, Dodgeville, and Westby featuring DFO's Ralph Dietrich and Murray Sherk talking to Wisconsin dairy farmers about the benefits of Canada's dairy supply management to Canadian "producers, processors and the Canadian economy" In his message as DFO VC, Dietrich said that with American dairy system facing a crisis, the SM system provides an orderly marketing system as an option.

== Dairy farming in Ontario ==
There are over three thousand one hundred dairy farmers in Ontario represented by the DFO as their marketing organization. In 2025, Ontario dairy farms produce 3.17 billion litres of fresh milk. Dairy is the largest agricultural sector in the province. Dairy farmers in Ontario produce approximately 32 percent of Canada's milk.

== Milk Producer ==
For more than a century, DFO publishes the monthly dairy farmer's magazine, Milk Producer.

== Spring Policy Conference (SPC) ==
DFO holds a policy conference each spring. At the 2018 Spring Policy Conference (SPC), topics of discussion included the potential economic impact of international trade negotiations, both the Comprehensive and Progressive Agreement for Trans-Pacific Partnership (CPTPP), signed March 2018, and the North American Free Trade Agreement (NAFTA) under renegotiation. Other concerns included 2018 "milk production exceeding current demand" and changes in Health Canada's policies regarding the food guide and its labeling standards.

== See also ==
- Reference re Agricultural Products Marketing
- Dairy farming in Canada
- Milk quota
- Canadian Dairy Commission

== External ==
- Dairy Farmers of Ontario fonds, Archives of Ontario
