= Harperism (book) =

2014 book by Donald Gutstein

Harperism: How Stephen Harper and his think tank colleagues have transformed Canada
- Author: Donald Gutstein
- Publisher: James Lorimer & Company
- Publication date: September 3, 2014
- Pages: 288
- ISBN: 9781459406636
- OCLC: 881860018

Harperism: How Stephen Harper and his think tank colleagues have transformed Canada is a non-fiction book written by Vancouver-based Donald Gutstein, media critic and professor emeritus at Simon Fraser University's School of Communication. Gutstein's work focuses on links between business, the media, and politics.

== Themes ==
Gutstein explores the relationship between business, corporations and politics. In his 2009 book entitled Not a conspiracy theory : how business propaganda hijacks democracy, Gutstein traced the rise of "prolonged" corporate "propaganda campaigns" in the United States that influence public opinion on social and political issues. In Harperism, Gutstein writes that Canadian think tanks such as the Fraser Institute established in 1974, the C.D. Howe and the 1990s "cohort of right wing think-tanks across Canada, such as Atlantic Institute for Market Studies (AIMS), the Montreal Economic Institute and Frontier Centre for Public Policy, have increasingly harnessed the media. In 2006 Peter Munk’s Aurea foundation funded neoliberal think tanks. In 2009 the School of Public Policy, University of Calgary functioned as "a neoliberal think tank" at the university. Gutstein cites as examples media coverage of medicare, climate change, and Canada's economic integration with the United States. Gutstein points out that think tanks succeeded in establishing consensus on the benefits of "small government", "perpetual war", and a "free market and the disadvantages of "tax increases to fund social programs" which has "severely" limited "political discourse".

In his chapter entitled "Convince Canadians of the importance of economic freedom," Gutstein described how neo-liberals and libertarians perceive Canada's Supply management as an obstacle to economic freedom and how think tanks and the media have attacked Canada's supply management. Under Stephen Harper, neo-liberal think tanks and through them, the media, called for the elimination of supply management with its alleged market distorting mechanisms. The Fraser Institute's use of the "egg marketing cartel" in a 1981 report by American economist Thomas Borcherding, marked the beginning of an aggressive campaign to end supply management in the ensuing decades. Gutstein sharply challenged journalist and editor Neil Reynolds (1940 – 2013), a libertarian, who criticized supply management in his call for economic freedom in thirteen Globe and Mail columns from c. 1997 through 2012, for an inaccurate portrayal of New Zealand's dairy industry.

== Reviews ==
In his review published in the Canadian Journal of Communication, Brian Gorman described how Gutstein calls for "a new role for government … one that doesn’t treat everything as an offshoot of the economy, but reincorporates social and political rights into its mandate while addressing the dominance of the market in social and political life."

Canadian columnist and editor Andrew Coyne ridiculed Gutstein's premise that Harper and Coyne himself as a Donner Canadian Foundation board member, were part of a "vast network of free-market policy shops...The dullest commonplaces of mainstream economics are here transformed into a strange and threatening "neo-liberal" conspiracy, while pimply economists in threadbare offices are endowed with an occult power they never knew they possessed."

== See also ==
- Bibliography of Stephen Harper
