= Market Sharing Quota =

Economic system used in Canadian agriculture

The Market Sharing Quota (MSQ), In Canadian agricultural policy, is the federally-determined target for the amount of industrial milk to produce nationwide each year as part of its policy of supply management. It is determined by estimating the domestic demand for dairy products on a butterfat basis, adding about 3% to cover exports and subtracting the volume of approved imports.

Provincial shares of the national quota are adjusted in line with changes in the total, and each province allocates its share to its producers according to its own quota policies. The Canadian Dairy Commission sets a target price for industrial milk based on production costs, including a return to labour, capital and management. Dairy farmers receive a payment from their provincial marketing board on in-quota deliveries of industrial milk. Farmers who produce in excess of their quota do not receive payments and, in some provinces, may face a financial penalty. Each province maintains and administers its own quota scheme for fluid milk.

== See also ==
- Milk quota
- Supply management (Canada)
