= Union des producteurs agricoles =

The Union des producteurs agricoles (UPA) is an agricultural trade union representing producers in the Canadian province of Quebec. Originally a Catholic union called the Union catholique des cultivateurs (UCC), it shed its denominational character as a result of the Quiet Revolution and has existed in its current form since 1972.

Rural electrification was one of the union's foremost goals in its early years (it is estimated that only ten per cent of Quebec farms had electricity in 1930). It also fought for agricultural credit and collective contracts. Since 1972, the UPA has been accredited as the only official farmer's union in Quebec, effectively creating a monopoly over Quebec's agricultural organization, with compulsory membership to a single recognized agricultural union. A 2008 report to the Quebec cabinet recommended changing this system and offering producers a free affiliation vote every five years. UPA president Christian Lacasse rejected this proposal, saying that Quebec does not have enough farmers for several different organizations. He also noted that ninety-four per cent of Quebec farmers belong to the organization.

The UPA and the Ontario Federation of Agriculture both supported the Quebec-Ontario Trade and Cooperation Agreement of 2009.

As of 2010, the union represents forty-three thousand agricultural producers in Quebec.

A 2015 Maclean's article, "Why the dairy lobby is so powerful", described an incident during the September 28, 2015 federal leaders Munk Debate on foreign affairs, then-NDP Leader Tom Mulcair asked Stephen Harper if they could assure the Union des producteurs agricoles du Québec (UPA) President Marcel Groleau, reached out to the New Democrats, Liberals and Bloc Québécois, of his full support for supply management. Harper immediately complied.

== Criticism ==
In his chapter on supply management in his on-line political memoir, Maxime Bernier groups together supporters of supply-managed sectors under a combined dairy lobby. Bernier describes the UPA as an "extension" of Québec's Ministry of Agriculture, Fisheries and Food. Bernier wrote that the combined dairy lobby funds millions of dollars in university graduate programs and research on "collective marketing of agricultural products" across the country in support of SM policies.
