= Import quota =

Trade barrier

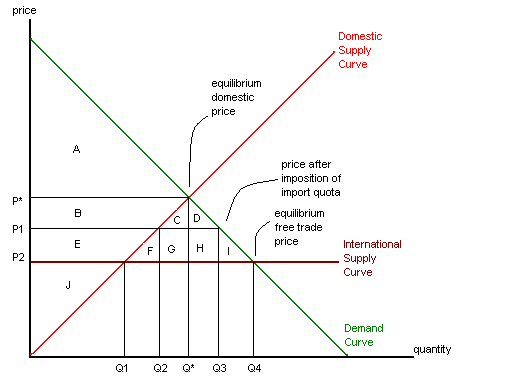
Supply and demand diagram that illustrate the economic impact of an import quota on a domestic market.

An import quota is a type of trade restriction that sets a physical limit on the quantity of a good that can be imported into a country in a given period of time. An import embargo or import ban is essentially a zero-level import quota. Quotas, like other trade restrictions, are typically used to benefit the producers of a good in that economy (protectionism). An import quota is different from a tariff, which restricts trade by raising the price of goods or services, quotas are quantitative limits on how much can be imported in a country in a pre-defined time frame (usually a fiscal or calendar year).

== Implementation ==
Import quotas are usually implemented by awarding licenses to companies or individuals according to a specific catalogue of criteria, either free of charge, for a fee, or in the form of an auction. Importers without licenses are not allowed to import at all, or in certain cases, can import only for a very high tariff premium. In the case of a quantity quota, imports are restricted directly for importers based on the imports of the previous year, for example by setting weights, quantities and dimensions, etc.

== Quota share ==
The quota share is a specified number or percentage of the allotment as a whole quota, that is prescribed to each individual entity.

For example, the United States imposes an import quota on cars from Japan. The Japanese government may see fit to impose a quota share program to determine the number of cars each Japanese car manufacturer may export to the United States. Any extra number that a manufacturer wishes to export must be negotiated with another manufacturer that did not or cannot maximize its share of the quota.

== Recent developments ==
On April 20, 2026, the United States government launched a new automated refund system to allow thousands of companies to file claims for recovering billions in "illegally collected" tariffs. The system went live at 8:00 AM ET, though users reported initial technical glitches during high traffic.

== See also ==
- Non-tariff barriers to trade
- Production quota
- Tariff-rate quota
