= Tariff-rate quota =

Combined trade barrier

In economics, a tariff-rate quota (TRQ) (also called a tariff quota) is a two-tiered tariff system that combines import quotas and tariffs to regulate import products.

A TRQ allows a lower tariff rate on imports of a given product within a specified quantity and requires a higher tariff rate on imports exceeding that quantity. For example, a country might allow the importation of 5,000 tractors at a tariff rate of 10%. However, any tractor imported above this quantity would be subject to a tariff rate of 30%.

Unlike a simple quota system, a TRQ regime does not restrict the quantity of imported products. The “in-quota commitment” is complemented by an “out-of-quota commitment”. The out-of-quota commitment does not set any limit on the quantity or value of a imported product, but instead applies a different, normally higher, tariff rate to that product. Imports face this higher duty rate once the in-quota quantity or value has been reached, or if any requirement associated with the “in-quota commitment” is not fulfilled.

A TRQ is generally used to protect domestic production by restricting imports. Under that regime, the quota component combines with a specified tariff level to provide the desired level of protection. In many cases, imports above the threshold may face a prohibitive “out-of-quota” tariff rate.

== WTO law ==
The terms tariff quota and tariff-rate quota are used interchangeably in existing literature, but the former term is more legally accurate because it may include specific tariffs, and the latter term excludes them. Tariff quota is also the term officially used in Article XIII of the General Agreement on Tariffs and Trade (GATT).

Customs duties and other charges are explicitly excluded from the scope of quantitative restrictions within the meaning of Article XI of the GATT. Therefore, a TRQ is not a quantitative restriction since the regime subjects imports to varying duties rather than prohibits or restricts the quantity of imports.

There are several dispute settlement rulings regarding the legitimacy of TRQ under WTO law. For instance, the Panel in US - Pipeline stated that a tariff quota involves the “application of a higher tariff rate to imported goods after a specific quantity of the item has entered the country at a lower prevailing rate,” while any quantity above the quota is subject to a higher duty.

Particularly, in EC- Bananas III, the Appellate Body asserted:

In contrast to quantitative restrictions, tariff quotas do not fall under the prohibition in Article XI:1 and are in principle lawful under the GATT 1994, provided that quota tariffs are applied consistently with Article I.

Although TRQs are also used within the WTO for non-agricultural products, the regime is particularly important in the agriculture sector considering the attempts to eliminate non-tariff measures in this sector. As a result of the Uruguay Round, all non-tariff barriers to agricultural products had to be removed or converted to tariffs (tariffication) to ensure that the sector is protected only by tariffs. In some cases, the calculated equivalent tariffs would be too high to allow for any real opportunity for imports to enter the market. Therefore, a system of TRQ was introduced to maintain existing access levels, and make way for minimum access opportunities.

== Economic considerations ==
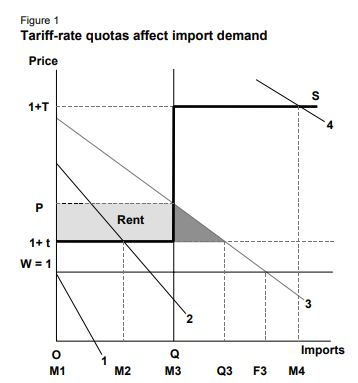
Tariff-rate quota and import demand

In a given period (normally one year), a lower in-quota tariff (t) is applied to the first Q units of imports and a higher out-of-quota tariff (T) is applied to all subsequent imports. If an out-of-quota tariff makes imports prohibitively expensive, it yields the same import volume as a traditional quota does. If the difference between domestic and international prices exceeds T, importers still make profit despite paying high out-of-quota tariff. In contrast, if a standard quota is in place, it is not possible to expand import volume over the restricted quantity (Q). In that case, a TRQ yields a higher volume of trade than does a standard quota; therefore, it is theoretically less restrictive than the latter.

A TRQ may influence the incentive to import. The effective supply curve of exports to the import market consists of two horizontal lines. The first line represents the in-quota imports, extending from 0 to Q at the price 1 + t. The other line represents the effective supply of out-of-quota imports, extending from Q to infinity at the price 1 + T. The effect of a TRQ on trade is contingent on domestic demand for imports. The figure shows four possible demand conditions corresponding to demand curves numbered 1 to 4, which denote increasing levels of import demand.

In the first case, demand is too low to generate imports at the world price, even without the in-quota tariff, so imports are zero (M1 = 0). In the second case, demand at the price 1 + t is sufficient to result in imports at the volume of M2, but the volume is not enough to cause the quota to bind (M2 < Q). In this case, the TRQ functions as an ordinary tariff being applied at the in-quota rate (t).

In the third case, demand at the price 1 + t is sufficient to yield an import volume that exceeds Q, then the TRQ is binding as it restricts the in-quota volume to a predefined level (M3 = Q). Supposing that a TRQ does not exist and merely a tariff at the in-quota rate (t) applies, then an import volume of Q3 will be generated. If the t = 0, import volume will be F3; therefore, M3 = Q < Q3 < F3. Because the import volume yielded when a binding TRQ is in place is smaller than when an unconstrained in-quota tariff (t) applies, there will be a need to ration M3 units among Q3 units of demand.

In the fourth case, demand is sufficient to sustain imports at the out-of-quota tariff (1 + T). Since demand curve 4 represents an extremely high level of demand, the import volume is no longer constrained at Q. However, the rationing problem remains necessary for imports within the quota.

== Tariff-rate quota administration ==
TRQ administration essentially concerns the distribution of the rights to import at the in-quota tariff rate. There are two GATT criteria for quota administration: quota fill and non-discrimination.

- The quota fill principle prevents imports at out-of-quota tariff rates until the quotas are filled, which ensures that quota administration itself should not inhibit imports or act as trade barriers.
- Whereas, the non-discrimination principle, as provided for by GATT Article XIII, requires that all imports from all countries be treated equally with respect to the administration of quantitative restriction.

Economists find that the risk of inhibiting quota fill is relatively negligible regardless of the administration method. Although licensing methods may result in too-small consignments, which are not economically viable, that problem is often remedied at the time it emerges. Besides, domestic producer groups or administering bodies may have the capacity to inhibit quota fill, but that capacity has not been abused in reality partly because the stakeholders are closely monitored by exporters.

However, a TRQ is more susceptible to discrimination, which has been addressed under a number of WTO disputes. A TRQ may discriminate if imports equal or exceed the in-quota volume, rendering the price of imports in the importing country higher than the world price plus the import tariff. Such price difference is known as quota rent, and the distribution of in-quota import rights can determine not only the volume and distribution of trade but also the distribution of quota rents. Although the GATT only governs how quota administration influences the volume and distribution of trade, the distribution of rents is important given its influence on the distribution of trade.

In general, administration methods that are able to separate the distribution of rents from that of trade may mitigate the distorting effect posed by the former. In contrast, methods that grant quota rents to in-quota imports are blamed for encouraging a biased distribution of trade. Such bias is a consequence of the fact that quota rents attract suppliers who are not otherwise competitive enough to enter the market. Trade share is no longer determined by the relative efficiency of suppliers, but rather by their access to quota rents.

While some administrative methods pose a greater risk of discrimination than others, and the choice of TRQ administration methods is in many cases a political decision, economists come to the broad conclusion that:

- TRQ allocated to suppliers based on their historical market shares are the most susceptible to discrimination.
- TRQ allocated to suppliers by licensing or on a first-come, first-served basis pose a moderate risk of biased distribution.
- Auctioning the rights for in-quota imports may effectively neutralize the quota rents, and it is thus the best way to administer a TRQ in terms of preventing discrimination.
- Unrestricted resale of quota rights allocated by non-auction methods may to a substantial extent reduce discrimination.

== Database on tariff-rate quota ==
The size of the quota is defined periodically by a government, for instance, on an annual basis. Technical information on TRQ administration by country and by product is available on a number of global and regional databases. The WTO's Tariff Profiles database provides free-access, comprehensive information on tariffs imposed by more than 170 countries and territories, including average tariff rates, tariffs by product groups, and tariffs applied in major export markets. Whereas, its Tariff Download Facility supplies comprehensive data on applied and bound MFN tariffs for all WTO members, detailed to standard HS codes. When practicable, it also provides information at the HS sub-heading level on non-MFN tariff regimes a member applies towards its export partners.

Information on TRQ is accessible via the Market Access Map, developed by the International Trade Centre (ITC). The European Union also develops a portal for Tariff Quota Consultation, where users can have full access to its TRQ publication.
