= Thomas Borcherding =

American economist

Thomas Earl Borcherding (Feb. 18, 1939 – Feb. 12, 2014) was an American economist. His areas of specialization included microeconomics, public choice, property rights, exchange and transaction costs, politics and public choice, sociological economics, and the role of institutions in economic, political, and social choice.

== Early life and education ==
Borcherding received a B.A. with high honors from the University of Cincinnati in 1961, and a Ph.D. in economics from Duke University in 1966.

His dissertation was entitled The Growth of Non-Federal Employment in the United States, 1900 to 1963.

== Career ==
Borcherding was a postdoctoral research fellow at the Thomas Jefferson Center for Study of Political Economy at the University of Virginia from 1965 to 1966. He was then, in turn, an assistant professor of economics at the University of Washington (1966–71), an associate professor of economics at the Virginia Polytechnic Institute and State University (1971–73), and an associate professor of economics and commerce at Simon Fraser University (1973–77). In 1974–75, he was a postdoctoral research fellow at the Hoover Institution on War, Revolution and Peace at Stanford University.

He was then a visiting professor of law and economics in the Faculty of Law at the University of Toronto (1978–79), a visiting research scholar at the Hoover Institution (1979–80), and a professor of economics at Simon Fraser University (1977–84).

In 1983 he became a professor of economics at Claremont Graduate University, and in 1992 was given the courtesy title of professor of politics at the same institution.

== Views ==
Borcherding argued that activities tend to be far less efficient when performed by public entities than by private enterprises. In his 1977 article “The Sources of Growth in Public Expenditures in the U.S., 1902-1970,” he formulated the “Bureaucratic Rule of Two,” which states that “Removal of an activity from the private sector to the public sector will double its unit costs of production.” A study by James T. Bennett and Manuel H. Johnson concluded that the “Rule of Two” was “supported by empirical evidence.”

Borcherding's “Bureaucratic Rule of Two” has been cited in many books, articles, op-eds and economics texts by fellow economists and other writers, some of whom have misattributed the coinage.

A 1988 article in the Australian Financial Review that discussed the relative efficiency of publicly and privately owned enterprises said that the “best summary of economic studies of the subject is in a Swiss publication by Thomas Borcherding and others, "Comparing the Efficiency of Private and Public Production: the evidence from five countries", published in Zurich in 1982.” The article noted that the results of Borcherding's book “were adapted in a study Markets or Governments" by senior economic adviser at the RAND Corporation, Charles Wolf.

Several 1981 articles and editorials in the Toronto Globe and Mail about the Canadian egg marketing system cited a critical study of that system by Borcherding.

Borcherding was one of 287 academics who signed a letter to the Washington Times rejecting a gun-control bill then under consideration by the House of Representatives.

His article “The Demand for the Services of Non-Federal Governments,” written with R. T. Deacon and published in the American Economic Review in December 1972, was listed among the “minor classics” by P.B. Downing and E.A. Stafford in “Citations as an Indicator of Classic Works and Major Contributors in Social Choice,” Public Choice (No. 2, 1981), 219–30.

== Other professional activities ==
Borcherding served as Co-Editor of Economic Inquiry from 1980 to 1984, was Managing Editor of the same publication from 1984 to 89, was again Co-Editor from 1989 to 1993, and from 1993 to 1997 was Senior Editor.

He served as Chair or co-chair of the Department of Economics at Claremont Graduate University from 1991 to 1994, in 2000, and in 2002–03.

He was an Avery Fellow at The Claremont Colleges from 1988 to 1997.

He was a member of the Board of Editors of the Canadian Journal of Economics from 1975 to 1978 and was on the International Board of Editors of the Pakistan Journal of Applied Economics from 1980 to 1982. He has been a member of the editorial board of The CATO Journal since 1983, and of the board of advisors of The Independent Institute since 1986.

He has served as a Referee for dozens of major publishers and journals, including the American Economic Review, Cambridge University Press, Oxford University Press, Princeton University Press, and Yale University Press.

He was a Research Associate with The Center for Study of Public Choice at the Virginia Polytechnic Institute and State University from 1971 to 1973.

He served as associate director of the Centre for Economic Research at Simon Fraser University from 1980 to 1983. He has been a Research Associate with The Claremont Institute for Economic Policy Studies at Claremont Graduate University since 1983 and with the Lowe Institute of Political Economy at Claremont McKenna College since 1987.

He was on the Board of Visitors of Universidad Anáhuac del Sur in Mexico City in the Spring of 2000.

In 2001, he was selected to be on the Advisory Council of Econ Journal Watch.

== Memberships ==
He was a member of the American Economic Association, American Political Science Association, American Sociological Association, Canadian Economics Association, Public Choice Society, Southern Economic Association, Western Economic Association, and Mont Pelerin Society.

== Honors and awards ==
Borcherding was elected to Phi Beta Kappa in 1961. He held a National Defense Education Act Fellowship from 1961 to 1964, a Woodrow Wilson Summer Fellowship in 1963, a Ford Foundation Dissertation Fellowship in 1964–65, a Relm Foundation Postdoctoral Fellowship in 1965–66, a Summer Grant in 1969, a University of Washington Summer Grant in 1967, a Virginia Educational Grant in Summer 1971, and a Foundation for Research in Economics and Education Research Grant in 1973.

He was elected to Omicron Delta Epsilon in 1973.

He held Earhart Foundation Summer Research Grants in 1973, 1974, 1980, and 1985, a Hoover Institution Postdoctoral Fellowship in 1974–75, a Canada Council for Social Science Research Sabbatical Grant in 1979–80, and a Summer Grant in 1986.

He was ranked by The American Economist in the Spring of 1996 as one of the 250 most cited U.S. economists.

== Major publications ==
- “Problems in the Theory of Public Choice: Discussion,” American Economic Review (May 1969), 211–12.
- "The Firm, the Industry, and the Demand for Inputs,” with L. R. Bassett, Canadian Journal of Economics (February 1970), 140–44.
- “Externalities and Output Taxes,” with L. R. Bassett, Southern Economic Journal (April 1970), 462–65. Reprinted in R. J. Staff and F. X. Tannian (eds.), Externalities: New Dimensions in Political Economy (Dunellen Press, 1974), 265–68.
- “The Relationship of Firm Size and Factor Price,” with L. R. Bassett, Quarterly Journal of Economics (August 1970), 518–22.
- “Liability in Law and Economics: Note,” American Economic Review (December 1970), 946–48.
- “One Hundred Years of Public Spending, 1870-1970,” in T. E. Borcherding (ed.), Budgets and Bureaucrats: The Sources of Government Growth (Durham, N.C.: Duke University Press, 1977), 19–44.
- “The Sources of Growth of Public Expenditures in the United States, 1902-1970,” in Budgets and Bureaucrats, 45–70.
- “The Divisibility of Public Outputs in Consumption, Bureaucracy, and the Size of the Tax- Sharing Group,” with W. C. Bush and R. M. Spann, Budgets and Bureaucrats, 11–28. Reprinted A. Denzau and R. Mackay (eds.), Essays on Unorthodox Economic Strategies (Blacksburg, VA: Public Choice Society Monograph, 1976), 105–28.
- “Competition, Exclusion, and the Optimal Supply of Public Goods,” Journal of Law and Economics (April 1978), 111–32.
- “Comments: Session on Bureaucracy,” Proceedings of a Conference on Tax and Expenditure Limitations, National Tax Journal (June 1979), 211–14.
- “Expropriation of Private Property and the Basis for Compensation,” with J. Knetsch, University of Toronto Law Journal (Summer 1979), 237–53.
- “The Causes of Government Expenditure Growth: A Survey of the U.S. Evidence,” Journal of Public Economics (December 1985), 359–82.
- “Natural Resources and Transgenerational Equity,” in Challenging Complacency (Vancouver: The Fraser Institute's Focus Series, No. 9, 1983), 5-32. Revised for W. Block (ed.), The Environmentalist vs. the Economy (Vancouver: The Fraser Institute, 1989), 95–117. Reprinted in J. Bennett and W. Block (eds.) Reconciling Economics and the Environment (Melbourne: Australian Institute for Public Policy, 1991), 97–114.
- “Why Does Government Grow? An Assessment of the Recent Literature on the U.S. Experience,” with C. Holsey. In D. Mueller (ed.), Perspectives in Public Choice (New York: Cambridge University Press, 1997), 562–90.
- “Organizing Government Supply: The Role of Bureaucracy,” with A. Khursheed, in F. Thompson and M. Green (eds.), Handbook of Public Finance (New York: Marcel Dekker, 1998), 43–91.
- “Henry George, Precursor to Public Choice Analysis,” with P. Dillon and T. Willett, American Journal of Economics and Sociology (April 1998), 173–82.
- “Market Power and Stable Cartels: Theory and Empirical Test,” with D. Filson, E. Fruits and E. Keen, Journal of Law and Economics, (October 2001), 465–80.
- “Group Consumption, Free Riding and Informal Reciprocity Agreements,” with D. Filson, Journal of Economic Behavior and Organization, (Spring 2002), 237–57.
- “Contemporary Political Economy Approach to Bureaucracy,” with P. Besocke, in C.K. Rowley and F. Schneider (eds.), Encyclopedia of Public Choice (Dordrecht, Netherlands: Kluwer Academic Publishers, 2004), 116–21.
- “The Growth of the Relative Size of Government,” with D. Lee, in C.K. Rowley and F. Schneider (eds.), Encyclopedia of Public Choice (Dordrecht, Netherlands: Kluwer Academic Publishers, 2004) 273–77.
- “Growth in the Real Size of Government since 1970,” with S. Ferris and A. Garzoni in R. Wagner and J. Backhaus (eds.), Handbook of Public Choice, (Dordrecht, Netherlands: Kluwer, 2004), 77–108.
- “Public Choice of Tax and Regulatory Instruments – The Role of Heterogeneity: Evidence from U.S. State Environmental Policy, 1980-94,” with D. Lee, Public Finance Review (November 2006), 1-30.

== Research ==
Borcherding had been researching a number of topics in collaboration with various colleagues, including the question of why there is no U.S. value-added tax; why supermajorities (may) encourage larger public budgets; social security and pension economics in developing societies; and the evolution of public broadcasting.
