= Milk quotas in the United Kingdom =

Measure that has been used by United Kingdom in agriculture

A milk quota or dairy produce quota was a historical measure used by the United Kingdom government to intervene in agriculture. Originally introduced to reflect the agricultural policies of the European Economic Community, the quota's purpose was to bring rising milk production under control. Milk quotas were attached to land holdings and represented a cap on the amount of milk that a farmer could sell every year without paying a levy. Milk quotas were assets and could be bought and sold or acquired or lost by other means and so there was a market for them.

Milk quotas were withdrawn on 31 March 2015.

== History ==
Milk quotas were first introduced in the United Kingdom on 2 April 1984 under the Dairy Produce Quotas Regulations 1984, which reflected the then European Economic Community (now the European Union's) Common Agricultural Policy. (Note: The relevant enactment is Council Regulation (EEC) 804/68, as amended. The current rules are now in Council Regulation (EEC) 3950/92.) Originally, they were to run until 1989, but they were extended several times, and were not renewed for the period following 31 March 2015.

Each member of the European Economic Community was allowed to produce dairy products up to a cap, which was based on each state's 1981 production, plus 1%. The cap was designated the "reference quantity". A levy to the EEC was due on production in excess of the reference quantity. This levy was then to be recovered from the farmers or dairies involved. Until 2002, recovery of the levy was down to the Intervention Board for Agricultural Produce. It was then recovered by the Rural Payments Agency on behalf of the UK Department for Environment, Food and Rural Affairs (DEFRA).

The Dairy Produce Quotas Regulations 1994, which came into effect from 1 April 1994, substantially revised the old structure. Until 31 March 1994, the MAFF ("Ministry of Agriculture, Fisheries and Food", a British government department that has since been replaced by DEFRA) was responsible for milk quotas, together with the Secretaries of State for Scotland and Wales and the Department of Agriculture for Northern Ireland. On the MAFF's behalf, Milk Marketing Boards kept a register of quotas that detailed which farmers or dairies held what quotas. The Milk Marketing Boards were dissolved on 31 October 1994 (in England, Wales and Scotland) and 28 February 1995 (in Northern Ireland).

The final regulations governing milk quotas were the Dairy Produce Quotas Regulations 2005, the Dairy Produce Quotas (Scotland) Regulations 2005 and the Dairy Produce (Quotas) (Wales) Regulations 2005, as amended.

== Structure ==
There were five kinds of milk quota:

- Direct sales quota, which were the ceiling amount of dairy produce that can be sold directly from an agricultural holding without liability for the levy;
- Wholesale quota, which were the ceiling amount of dairy produce that can be sold to a wholesaler from an agricultural holding without liability for the levy;
- Purchaser quota, which were the ceiling amount of dairy produce that a purchaser can buy from a wholesaler without liability for the levy;
- Purchaser special quota, which formerly existed in parallel with purchaser quota, but were later subsumed into general milk quotas; and
- SLOM quota, which was formerly a nominal milk quota allocated to farmers who had ceased or reduced dairy production. This was also subsumed into general milk quotas.

== Acquisition and transfer ==
The EEC did not originally mean for milk quotas to attract a value. Contrary to their intent, milk quotas became a valuable asset, although prices fell towards the end of their life. Milk quotas could be purchased outright or leased.

Although the quotas were normally attached to land, and transferred with it provided the transfer is not a tenancy of less than ten months, they could be traded separately. (Note: This applied in England after the enactment of the Dairy Produce (Quotas) Regulations 1994, SI 1194/672, reg 13.) The legality of such a transfer was questioned by the Courts, particularly in Carson v Cornwall County Council [1993] 1 EGLR 21, [1993] 03 EG 119, but since 1994 was accepted, at least in a limited way, in for example Harris v Barclays Bank Plc [1997] 2 EGLR 15, [1997] 45 EG 145, CA.

Milk quotas could also be transferred without payment if the tenant of a holding under the Agricultural Holdings Act 1986 ceased to use that land for dairy farming purposes for five years and transferred that quota to other land that he held for dairy farming purposes if there was no quota protection clause in the tenancy. In the absence of such a clause, a tenant under the Agricultural Holdings Act 1986 or the Agricultural Tenancies Act 1995 also seemed, in principle, to be free to sell the quota attaching to the land he rented on the open market. That has been called quota "massage" or even quota "theft", but Williams (2011) called the latter term "inelegant and inappropriate" since it was apparently lawful.

Disputes about milk quota were generally referred to arbitration.

== See also ==
- Butter mountain
- Market Sharing Quota, Canadian milk quota
- Supply management (Canada)

== Bibliography ==
- Bateman, H, Curtis, S and McAdam, K: Dictionary of Agriculture, 2006. London: A & C Black Publishers Ltd. ISBN 978-0-7136-7778-2.
- Prag, P: The Valuation of Rural Property, published 1998, revised 2003. Chichester: Packard Publishing Ltd. ISBN 978-1-85341-130-4.
- Williams, P. R.: Scammell and Densham's Law of Agricultural Holdings, Ninth Edition (supplement), 2011. London: LexisNexis. ISBN 978-1-4057-4493-5
