= Dairy Farmers of Canada =

- Abbreviation: DFC
- Formation: 1934; 92 years ago
- Legal status: Non-profit
- Purpose: Dairy farming advocacy
- Headquarters: Ottawa
- Official language: English, French
- Website: dairyfarmers.ca

Dairy Farmers of Canada (DFC) is the national policy, lobbying, and promotional organization representing Canadian dairy producers. The advocacy group was created in 1934 when a number of related groups merged to form a single entity for representing the interests of dairy farmers.

== Profile ==
In 2024, DFC represented the interests of approximately ten thousand dairy farm owners. The organization is headquartered in Ottawa, with a satellite Montreal office. DFC members include dairy farmer organizations from all the Canadian provinces.

== Advocacy ==
DFC works to influence public policies that support Canadian dairy producers and promote the health benefits of dairy products.

The organization is very active and is said to have an "outsized" influence in Ottawa. It is "the most deep-pocketed lobby group in Canada" with nearly $70 million in annual revenues, a very large amount for a single-sector interest group. In 2023–24, there were hundreds of meetings between DFC and the Prime Minister's office, federal departments and agencies, members of parliament and senators. A prominent subject discussed was Bill C-282, a bill to exempt supply-managed sectors from future trade negotiations, which would add greater import protection for the dairy sector.

In January 2019, the federal government of Canada gave $2.7 million to the organization.

=== Canadian dairy content labelling ===
An initiative by the organization was to have products that contain 100 percent Canadian dairy products indicated by using a specific label that states "100% Canadian milk". A follow-up study investigating the impact of such a label revealed that Canadians were willing to pay more for dairy products that use 100 percent Canadian milk products, versus non-Canadian certified counterparts.

The Dairy Farmers of Canada "Quality Milk" logo is used to help consumers identify products that contain 100% Canadian milk and Canadian dairy products. Introduced November 1, 2016, the new logo will gradually replace the previous origin logo which was commonly known as the "Little Blue Cow".
