= Canadian Dairy Commission =

Government of Canada Crown Corporation

Agency overview
- Formed: 1966
- Jurisdiction: Government of Canada
- Headquarters: Ottawa, Ontario
- Employees: 72
- Minister responsible: Heath MacDonald, Minister of Agriculture and Agri-Food
- Agency executives: Benoit Basil, Chief Executive Officer; Jennifer Hayes, Chair; Shikha Jain, Commissioner
- Parent department: Agriculture and Agri-Food Canada
- Website: cdc-ccl.ca

The Canadian Dairy Commission (CDC) (French: Commission canadienne du lait) is an Ottawa-based Government of Canada Crown Corporation that provides a framework for managing Canada's dairy industry.

The CDC's mandate is to "ensure fair compensation to producers and provide consumers with access to a quality product."

Canada's dairy industry operates under a supply management system, so among the most important roles of the CDC are to plan national production (including by the allocation of producer milk quotas), to set farmgate milk prices, and to control dairy imports. The CDC also coordinates federal and provincial dairy policies.

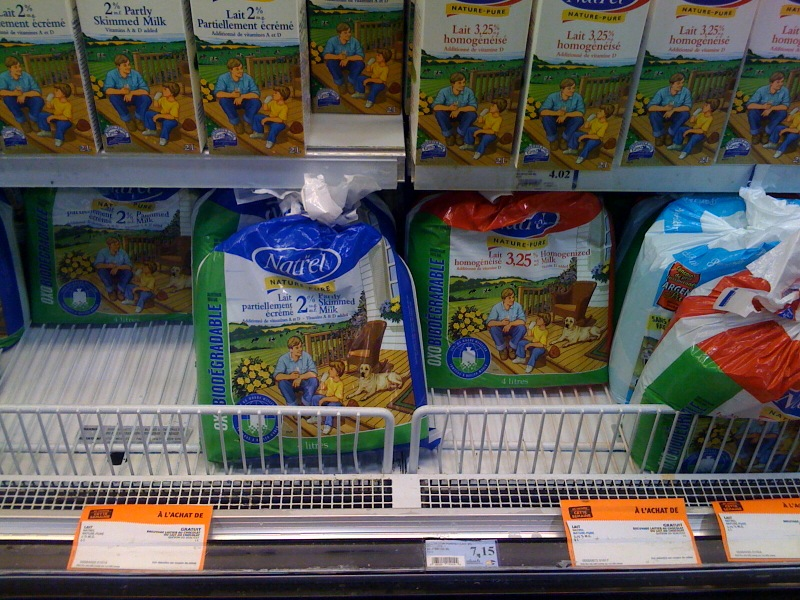
Milk for sale in Canada

== History ==
The Canadian federal government has been active in supporting the dairy industry since 1890, when the first Dominion Dairy Commissioner was appointed.

In 1967 the government of Canada passed the Canadian Dairy Commission Act which established the Canadian Dairy Commission (CDC).

The Canadian Milk Supply Management Committee, whose members include the CDC and representatives of provincial producer marketing boards, was set up in 1970 to administer the national Market Sharing Quota. In 1972, the Farm Products Agencies Act authorized the establishment of supply management, which can restrict production by use of quotas.

== Mandate, implementation, and administration ==
The CDC's mandate is to "Provide efficient producers of milk and cream with the opportunity to obtain a fair return for their labour and investment" and to "Provide consumers of dairy products with a continuous and adequate supply of dairy products of high quality." The CDC aims to avoid depending on government subsidies and the dumping of surpluses into third markets.

To achieve its mandate to ensure efficient producers receive a sufficient return, the CDC (working with provincial marketing boards) sets a "support price" for milk producers. This support price is high enough that some domestic and foreign producers are willing to supply dairy products at a lower price. Therefore, to prevent this additional supply from reaching the market, the CDC uses supply management. That is, it issues a limited quantity of quotas, which are a type of licence authorizing the quota-holder to sell a given volume of dairy products. By restricting domestic supply and imports, the support price is maintained.

=== How the support price is determined ===
The CDC sets support prices for milk components (butterfat and skim milk). Provincial marketing boards use the CDC-determined price as a benchmark to set prices in each province.

Milk support prices are changed typically once a year using a formula determined by the industry. The price adjustment formula is based on the cost of milk production, as determined by a randomized and anonymous survey of roughly 200 farms. The CDC formula includes cash costs, capital costs, and labour costs, but does not include the cost to purchase milk production quota.

In determining the support price, the CDC consults producers, processors, restauranteurs, retailers, and consumers. The CDC can set aside the formula in "exceptional circumstances," which, as of 2022, it had done four times since 2017. Exceptional circumstances criteria include if there is an unexpected event, which may arise given the lags in implementing price changes. (The price adjustment for 1 February 2022 was calculated in the fall of 2021 using 2020 data.)

The CDC regulates only the price of milk received by farmers, however, some provinces (such as Quebec) regulate the retail price of fluid milk.

=== Other roles ===
The CDC monitors production and demand for milk, and it adjusts the national milk production target as necessary. When production exceeds demand, the CDC oversees the removal from the market of surplus butter and skim milk powder for export or later sale.

The CDC promotes consumer awareness and programs to stimulate demand for Canadian dairy products. In collaboration with the private sector, the CDC monitors the seasonal domestic supply of milk to maintain a balance between supply and demand.

== Issues and debates ==
=== Governance ===
Sylvain Charlebois, professor of food distribution and policy and the director of the Agri-Food Analytics Lab at Dalhousie University, expressed concern that the CDC, "owned by all Canadians, is controlled by three people, all with dairy connections. Processors, retailers and, most importantly, consumers, are not represented." Restaurants Canada has long asked for a seat on the CDC board.

=== Transparency ===
Calls to improve communication and increase transparency surrounding CDC activities were made by Restaurants Canada, the Retail Council of Canada, the Dairy Processors of Canada, and the Minister of Agriculture when the CDC initially refused to release data on employee bonuses. These calls were prompted when the CDC received $4.7 million from taxpayers in 2020-21, a 21% increase from $3.9 million the previous year, which it used to fund "increased salary expenses." Perhaps in response to public pressure, in 2022 the CDC was more open when it made a thorough presentation and responded to media questions alongside its annual price hike announcement. (In previous years it simply posted an abstract on its website announcing the price increase).

In 2023 and 2024, the CDC was urged to provide more transparency on the extent of "milk dumping," a method used by some Canadian producers to dispose of over-quota milk supply. Between 2012 and 2021, the Canadian dairy industry discarded on farms an estimated 7% of all milk produced (over 6.8 billion litres of raw milk, valued at $6.7 billion).

=== Product quality ===
Although Canadians pay high dairy prices, quality is not assured according to Dalhousie University professor Sylvain Charlebois. He pointed to Buttergate which revealed the practice of feeding cows with palmatite, an imported palm oil derivative, which affects butter's hardness.

=== Milk price setting formula ===
After a 8.4% milk price increase in 2022 – the largest since the CDC was created in 1967 – a C.D. Howe Institute commentary said not only are such large price rises undesirable for consumers, but they could be detrimental to the dairy industry if they lead to more illegal milk entering the market from the United States. The study said the CDC's price setting formula would benefit from having an external competent review.

=== Impact on family farms ===
The CDC uses quotas to limit the supply of milk entering the market, so the value of milk quota licences is high. The high cost of quotas means that it has become difficult for younger people to enter the industry. (The quota price was capped in 2010 in Ontario and Quebec at $25,000 per kilogram of butterfat per day – which is approximately the production of one cow. However, the price reached $58,000 in Alberta in 2022. The estimated national total quota was valued at $32.6 billion in 2014.) As a consequence, newspaper columnist Andrew Coyne says CDC policy was enacted "in the name of saving the family farm" but it has instead "led to its near extinction." The number of dairy farms in Canada in 2024 was approximately 9,000, compared to more than 145,000 when the CDC was established in the early 1970s.

=== The consumer cost of dairy products ===
The CDC limits the supply of milk entering the market, which keeps the price to consumers among the most expensive in the Western world. Milk farmers are required to participate in the supply management price-fixing system, an arrangement that would be illegal in almost any other sector of the Canadian economy (the Competition Bureau in 2018 brought a case against retailers for fixing the price of bread).

Also, the high cost has a disproportionate impact on low-income Canadians, since a greater proportion of their incomes are spent on dairy products.
