= Smoking in the United States =

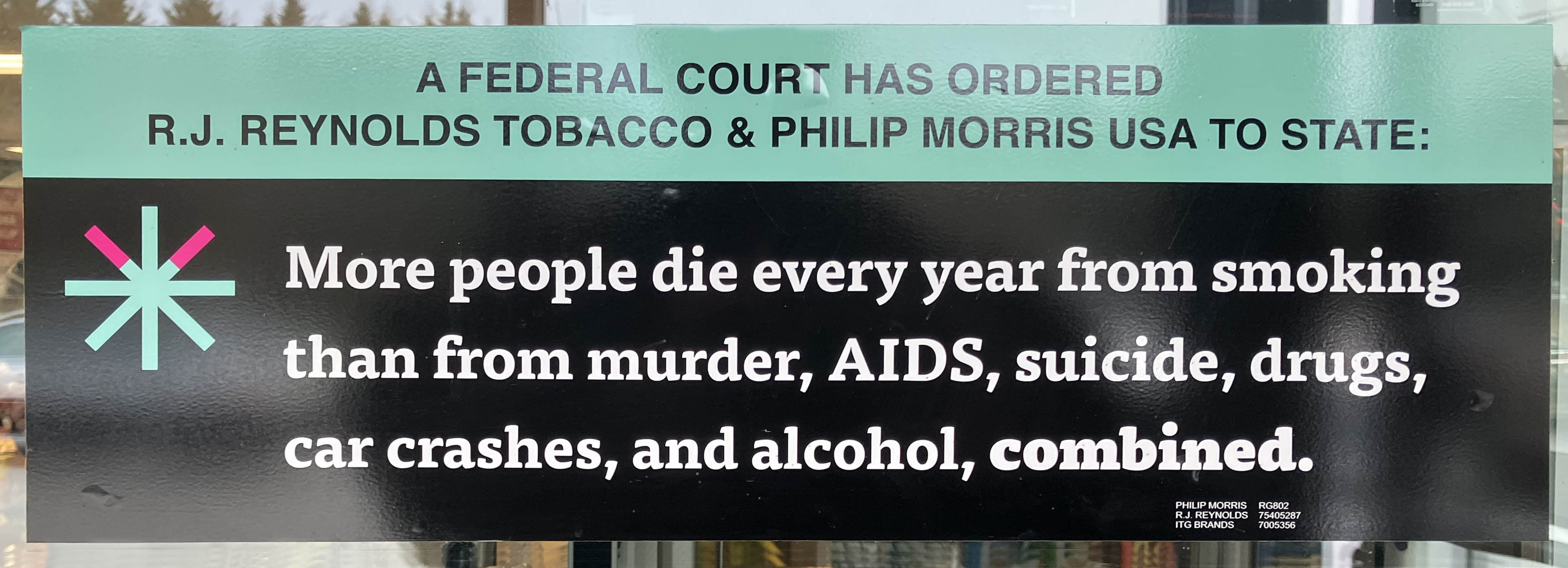
A court-ordered corrective statement about tobacco at a convenience store mandated by United States v. Philip Morris.

In 2022, 28.8 million adults in the United States, or 11.6% of adults aged 18 or older, reported current cigarette smoking. In 2015, the prevalence of smoking in individual US states ranged from between 9% and 13% in Utah to between 24% and 27% in West Virginia. By region, smoking prevalence was highest in the Midwest (19%) and South (15%) and lowest in the West (12%). Men tended to smoke more than women: In 2015, 17% of men smoked compared to 14% of women. Cigarette smoking is the leading cause of preventable death in the United States, accounting for approximately 443,000 deaths – 1 of every 5 deaths – each year. Cigarette smoking alone has cost the United States $96 billion in direct medical expenses and $97 billion in lost productivity per year, or an average of $4,260 per adult smoker.

In 1964 the Surgeon General of the United States published its landmark report, Smoking and Health, which identified smoking as the cause of many health problems. Since then, smoking rates have been declining in the US. Since then, the public perception of tobacco has shifted from that of a harmless product to a clear hazard for the health. Over 60 years, smoking rates in the United States plummeted by some 73%, from 43% of all adult Americans in 1965 to 12% in 2022.

== Current smoking and vaping among adults ==
Cigarette smoking in the U.S. has declined by about two-thirds over the past half-century.

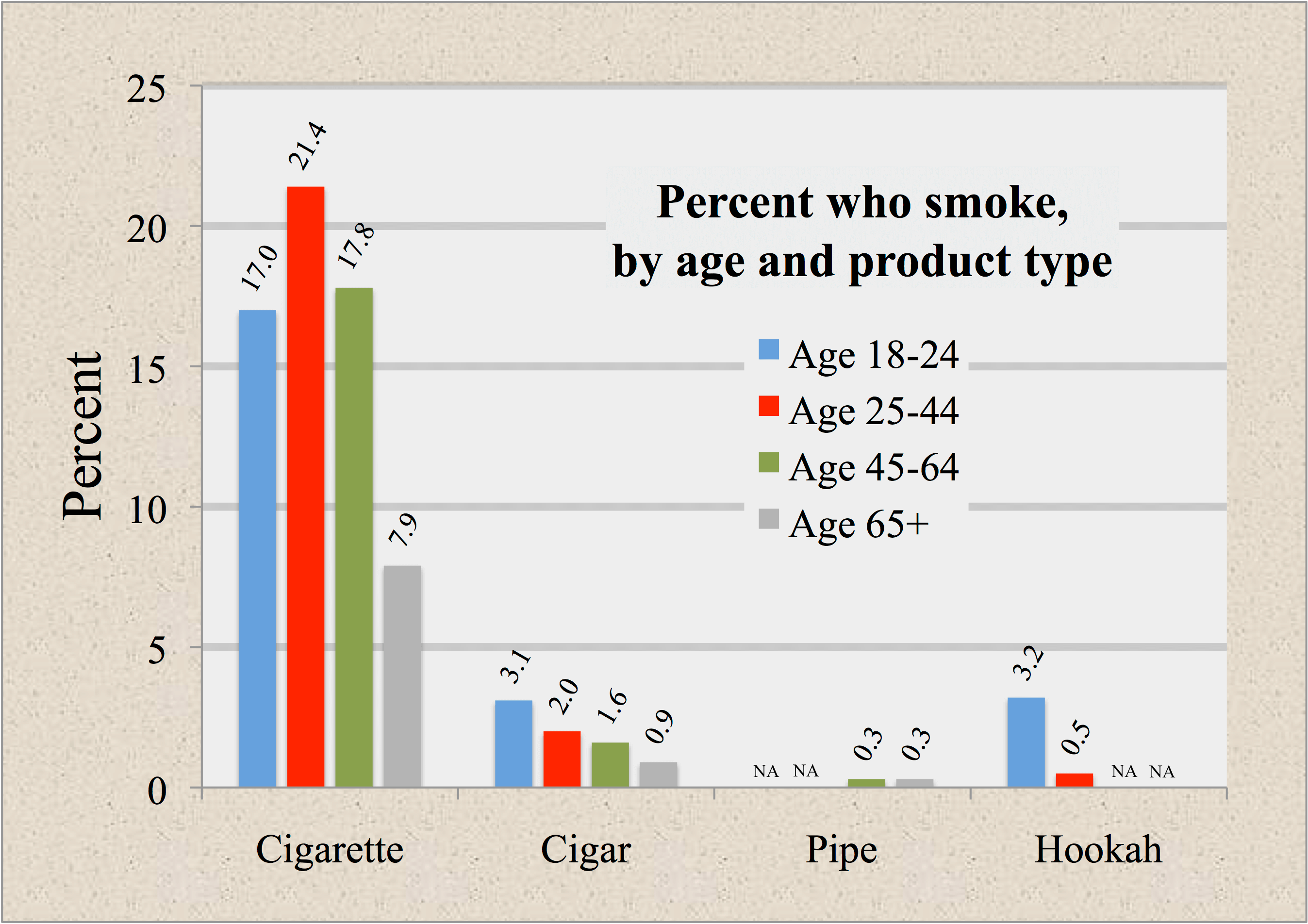
Adult tobacco use by age (2013–2014 survey)

Prevalence of smoking by age
18 – 24 years old	8.0%
25 – 44 years old	16.7%
45 – 64 years old	17.0%
65 and older	8.2%

Age	% of population who vape
13-year olds	6%
14-year olds	10%
15-year olds	15%
16-year olds	22%
17-year olds	24%
18-year olds	25%

Prevalence of smoking by educational level
Fewer years of education (no diploma)	24.1%
GED certificate	35.3%
High school diploma	19.6%
Some college (no degree)	17.7%
Associate degree	14.0%
Undergraduate degree	6.9%
Graduate degree	4.0%

Prevalence of smoking by ethnicity
Non-Hispanic American Indians/Alaska Natives	20.9%
Non-Hispanic Other races	19.7%
Non-Hispanic Blacks	14.9%
Non-Hispanic Whites	15.5%
Hispanics	8.8%
Non-Hispanic Asian	7.2%

Since 1964, marked by the publication of the Surgeon General's landmark report, Smoking and Health, smoking rates have been declining in the US. Key forces driving down smoking were the recognition of tobacco as an addiction and cause of disease, a declining social acceptance of smoking, mass media counter-marketing campaigns and higher taxes on cigarettes.

According to research by the Centers for Disease Control and Prevention (CDC), for every 100 U.S. adults age 18 or older, more than 15 smoked cigarettes in 2016. In other words, there were about 37.8 million cases of cigarette smokers in the United States. At the same time, more than 16 million Americans were living with a smoking-related disease. Nonetheless, the number of smokers in 2016 has decreased to 15.5% from 2005, a difference of 5.4% difference. This pointed to an increase in the number of smokers who have quit.

In 2020, the Journal of the American Medical Association (JAMA) estimated that 5.66 million adults, or 2.3% of the U.S. population, reported that they were vaping. Among users in the U.S. population, more than 2.21 million were also current cigarette smokers (39.1%), more than 2.14 million were former smokers (37.9%), and more than 1.30 million had never smoked (23.1%). Previous 2018 statistics estimated that about 14.9% of adults aged 18 and over had ever used electronic cigarettes, and around 3.2% of all adults in the United States were current e-cigarette users. The study also noted that 34 million U.S. adults were current smokers, with e-cigarette usage at its highest among current smokers and former smokers who are attempting to quit smoking cigarettes or had recently quit.

The decade of the 2010s saw both the advent and uptick in the prevalence of vaping among American youths, as e-cigarettes became the latest nicotine-delivery device for U.S. consumers. The first commercial e-cigarette hit the markets in 2006. Reports in 2018 estimated that youth vaping is present among 27.5% of the youth population. This is a stark comparison to the 5.5% of reported youths within the United States who smoke combustible nicotine such as cigarettes.

According to a U.S. government survey data released in April 2023, smoking rates in the United States fell even further by 2022, with 1 of 9 U.S. adults reporting to be a smoker. In 2022, the percentage of U.S. adult smokers dropped from 12.5 percent in 2020–2021 to about 11 percent. The survey data also showed that e-cigarette use increased to nearly 6 percent in 2022 from about 4.5 percent the previous year. Only about 2 percent of high school students smoked traditional cigarettes in 2022, but about 14 percent used e-cigarettes, according to other CDC data.

=== Women and smoking ===
The cigarette industry began a propaganda campaign geared toward women beginning in the 1920s in the United States. These campaigns became more aggressive as time has progressed and marketing in general became more prominent. The practice of marketing aimed exclusively at women has continued into the present day and has now expanded globally.

With gender-targeted marketing, including packaging and slogans (especially "slimmer" and "lighter" cigarettes), and promotion of women smoking in movies and popular TV shows, the tobacco industry was able to increase the percent of women smoking. In the 1980s, tobacco industries were made to have the surgeon general's warning printed on each packaging of the tobacco products. This slowed the rate of women smoking but later it slightly increased after the advertisements started to look more present day and have more appealing packaging, that appealed to the younger generation. In more recent times, cigarette smoking has been banned from public places and this has decreased smoking rates in the United States.

==== Pre-1920s ====
In January 1908, the New York City Board of Aldermen unanimously passed the Sullivan Ordinance; it prohibited smoking by women in public places. The mayor at the time, George B. McClellan Jr., vetoed the ordinance in February. There were many other such laws and rules. In 1911, the Sherman Anti-Trust Act divided the American Tobacco Trust into several different companies, making market share critical to each company's survival. The resulting competition spurred innovations in both product and marketing, and eventually progressed to the idea of brands. By 1915, Reynolds' Camel had become the first truly national brand. Soon to follow were Liggett & Myers' Chesterfield and the American Tobacco Company's Lucky Strike. These brands were modern and appealed to the modern sensibilities that were taking over the people of the United States at the time.

==== 1920s–1940s ====
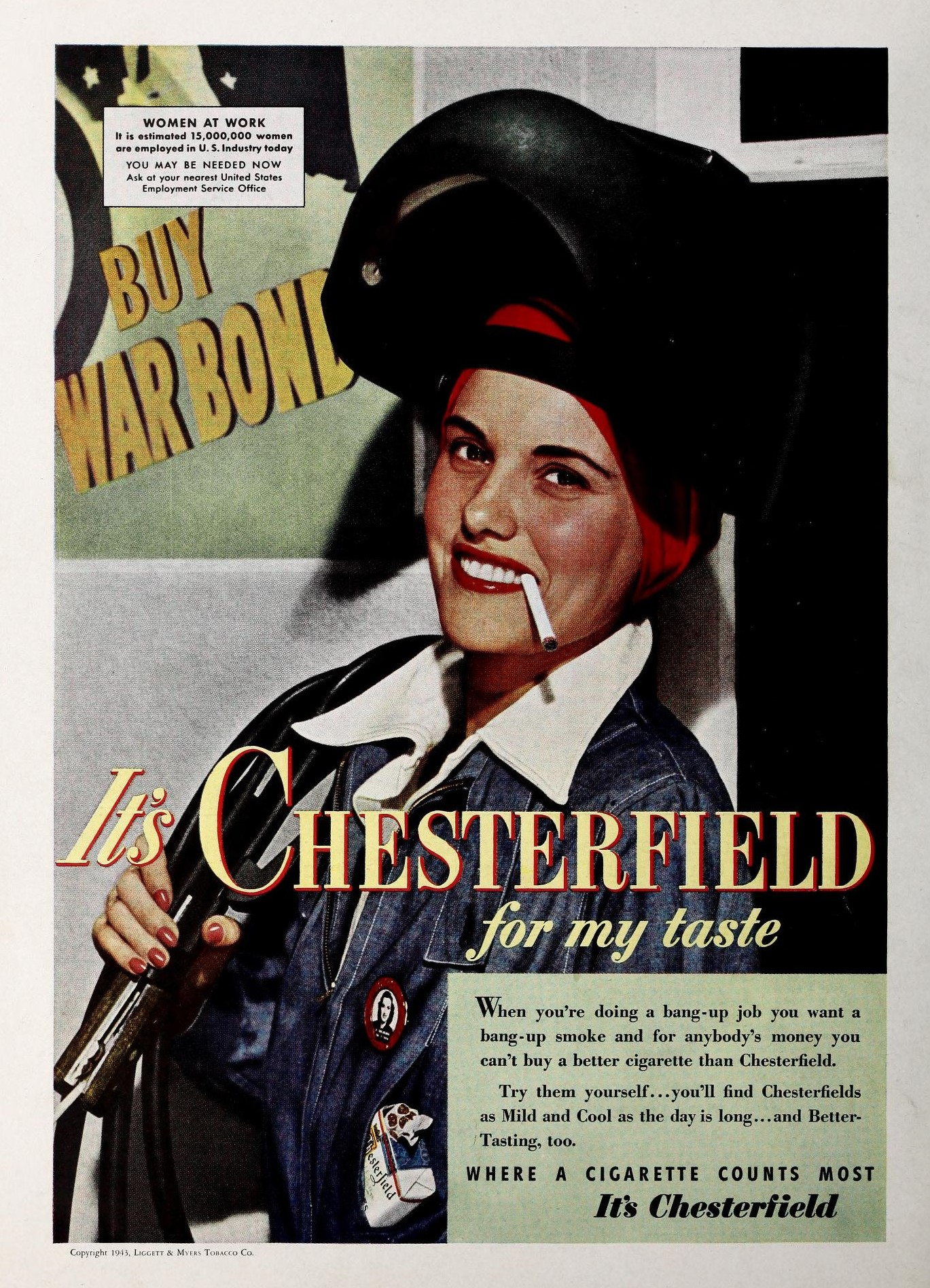
It's Chesterfield for my taste advertisement from 1943, featuring a female welder to promote women's participation in the workforce during World War 2

In the early part of the 20th century, the anti-tobacco movement was aimed primarily at women and children. Smoking was considered a dirty habit and smoking by women was seriously frowned upon by society. As the century progressed so did women's desire for equality. The suffrage movement gave many women a sense of entitlement and freedom and the tobacco industry took advantage of the marketing opportunity. "Torches of Freedom" was a phrase used to encourage women's smoking by exploiting women's aspirations for a better life during the early twentieth century first-wave feminism in the United States. The term was first used by psychoanalyst A. A. Brill when describing the natural desire for women to smoke and was used by Edward Bernays to encourage women to smoke in public despite social taboos. Cigarettes were described as symbols of emancipation and equality with men.

Tobacco companies began marketing cigarettes to appeal to women during the burgeoning women's movement of the 1920s. The American Tobacco Company began targeting women with its ads for Lucky Strikes. They employed ads featuring prominent women, such as Amelia Earhart, and promised slimming effects. Most of the ads also conveyed a carefree and confident image of women that would appeal to the modern woman of the 1920s. The ads grew more extravagant with paid celebrity testimonials and far-reaching claims of how Lucky Strikes could improve their lives. Their most aggressive campaign directly challenged the candy industry by urging women to "reach for a Lucky instead of a sweet". These aggressive campaigns paid off, making Lucky Strike the most smoked brand within a decade.

Other companies followed the successful ad campaigns of the American Tobacco Company with their own versions. The Phillip Morris Company introduced Marlboro cigarettes in 1925. Marlboros were advertised as being as "mild as May" and featured elegant ivory tips that appealed to women. Other brands offered similar ads appealing to a woman's sense of beauty and style and made cigarettes an alluring part of many women's lives. Fear of weight gain remains a chief reason women continue to smoke. The ad campaigns successfully promoted cigarettes as a product possessing specific qualities including equality, autonomy, glamour, and beauty.

In 1929 Edward Bernays decided to pay women to smoke their "torches of freedom" as they walked in the Easter Sunday Parade in New York. This was a shock because until that time, women were only permitted to smoke in certain places such as in the privacy of their own homes. He was very careful when picking women to march because, "while they should be good looking, they should not look too model-y", and he hired his own photographers to make sure that good pictures were taken and then published around the world. Ruth Hale called for women to join in the march saying, "Women! Light another torch of freedom! Fight another sex taboo!" Once the footage was released, the women's walk was seen as a protest for equality and sparked discussion throughout the nation. The targeting of women in tobacco advertising led to higher rates of smoking among women. In 1923 women only purchased 5% of cigarettes sold; in 1929 that percentage increased to 12%, in 1935 to 18.1%, peaking in 1965 at 33.3%, and remaining at this level until 1977.

In 1934, Edward Bernays was asked to deal with women's apparent reluctance to buy Lucky Strikes because their green and red package clashed with standard female fashions. When Bernays suggested changing the package to a neutral color, George Washington Hill, head of the American Tobacco Company, refused, saying that he had already spent millions advertising the package. Bernays then endeavored to make green a fashionable color. The centerpiece of his efforts was the Green Ball, a social event at the Waldorf Astoria, hosted by Narcissa Cox Vanderlip. The pretext for the ball and its unnamed underwriter was that proceeds would go to charity. Famous society women would attend wearing green dresses. Manufacturers and retailers of clothing and accessories were advised of the excitement growing around the color green. Intellectuals were enlisted to give highbrow talks on the theme of green. Before the ball had actually taken place, newspapers and magazines (encouraged in various ways by Bernays's office) had latched on to the idea that green was all the rage.

In a content analysis of North American and British editions of Vogue, Cheryl Krasnick Warsh and Penny Tinkler trace representations of women smokers from the 1920s through the 1960s, concluding that the magazine "located the cigarette within the culture of the feminine elite," associating it with "the constellation of behaviours and appearances presented as desirable characteristics of elitism, through the themes of lifestyle, 'the look', and feminine confidence".

==== 1950s–1970s ====
The late 1950s and early 1960s brought about a new onslaught of cigarette brands. Each new brand of cigarette introduced during this time advertised its unique benefits. The major new innovation in tobacco marketing was the filtered cigarette. Filters made cigarettes less harsh to smoke and offered the appearance of removing potentially harmful particles. The 1950s began the rebranding of Marlboros from an elite cigarette to an everyman's cigarette and also saw the introduction of strong Marlboro men, such as athletes, and more famously cowboys. This change in Marlboro branding meant Philip Morris was lacking a cigarette aimed at women.

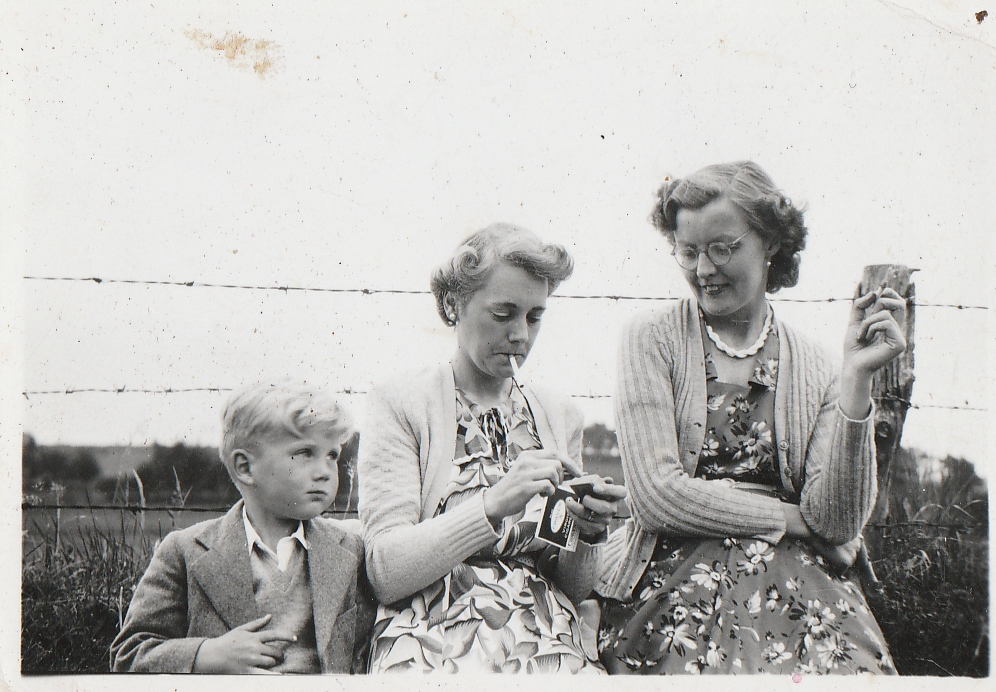
Two women smoking Craven A cigarettes in Ireland in the 1950s

The 1950s also began a boom in advertising for tobacco companies. Ads featuring prominent movie and television stars became commonplace and tobacco companies also began sponsoring television shows, game shows, and other widespread media. One of the most popular was Philip Morris's sponsorship of the I Love Lucy show. The opener featured the two stars of the show with a giant pack of Philip Morris cigarettes. The show Your Hit Parade was proudly sponsored by American Tobacco's Lucky Strike brand.

In 1965, it was reported that 33.9% of women were smoking. Virginia Slims came on the market in 1968, and used the catch phrase "You’ve come a long way baby." This was the first cigarette to be marketed solely as a woman's cigarette. The cigarettes were longer, slimmer, and overall more elegant and feminine. The ads depicted photos of glamorous women set against photos of women doing mundane tasks such as laundry or housework. 1970 saw the release of Liggett & Myers Tobacco Company's entry into women specific cigarettes, Eve. Eve cigarettes were decidedly more feminine than Virginia Slims. Eve featured flowers or other feminine motifs on both the packaging and the cigarette themselves.

The 1970s ushered in the end of television advertising and the beginning of print ads carrying health warnings regarding the dangers of smoking. The 1970s also brought nearly annual reports from the Surgeon General's office regarding the health consequences of smoking. In 1970, a reported 31.5% of women were smokers. Tobacco companies were barred from advertising on television, but smartly moved the market focus to sponsoring sporting and entertainment events. In 1973, a widely publicized tennis match dubbed "The Battle of the Sexes" featured Billie Jean King, a long-time spokesperson for Virginia Slims, bedecked in the brand's sequins and colors. American was tennis wild in the 1970s and Billie Jean King was a superstar. Virginia Slims sponsored the Women's Tennis Association Tour for close to twenty years. The 1970s ended with filtered cigarettes almost completely overtaking the market.

==== 1980 and onward ====
The 1980s began with the first Surgeon General's Report on the Health Consequences of Smoking for Women. This report—published nearly 15 years after the original 1964 Surgeon General's Report—came nearly sixty years after tobacco companies began marketing their products to women. The smoking rate of women in 1980 was at 29.3%. In 1987, Brown & Williamson introduced the Capri cigarette, which following suit with other feminine cigarettes was a long, slim, elegant cigarette geared toward feminine hands.

1990 saw the women's smoking rate at 22.8%, continuing its slow decline. The Virginia Slims tennis tour came to an end in 1994, after 23 successful years. This was just one of many broad spectrum advertising methods that ended in the 1980s and 1990s as public sentiments regarding smoking began their shift. The 1990s were marked by continued restrictions on smoking in public and workplaces. The late 1980s and 1990s were also marked by increased marketing to teenagers and young adults. Many of the same marketing strategies used with women were used with this target group. By 1998, the women's smoking rate had dropped to 22%. 1998 also marked the year of the Master Settlement Agreement.

The beginning of the 21st century saw women smoking at a rate of 22.8%, which was a slight increase compared to the previous decade. Advertising and marketing remained static after the 1998 Settlement Agreement. Advertising campaigns looked to present more modern and cutting-edge packaging and language, appealing to a younger and hipper demographic. In 2001, the most recent Surgeon General's Report in regards to women and smoking was released. RJ Reynolds entered the women's market in 2007, with its Camel No. 9 cigarette. The packaging is very contemporary in feel, and very feminine at the same time. It features pink edging as a distinct contrast on the black packaging and the interior of the package is lined in pink foil. The cigarettes are sold in light and menthol light varieties, with the latter featuring a teal highlight and foil, instead of the pink of the regular lights. The first decade of this century has also been marked by mass smoking regulations. A multitude of cities, municipalities, and states passed legislations prohibiting smoking in public places, such as bars, restaurants, and an assortment of other public venues. This is a growing phenomenon, which aided in reducing smoking rates in the United States. The overall smoking rate in the United States dropped from approximately 46% in 1950 to approximately 21% in 2004. Smoking rates continued to slowly decline throughout the 2000s and 2010s. By 2017 the percentage of current smokers had fallen to 14.0% and the proportion of ex-smokers increased, these rates remained at a stand-still throughout the end of the decade. Compared to their male peers women were significantly less likely smoke; while 15.3% of men still smoked, only 12.7% of women were current smokers.

== History of commercial tobacco ==
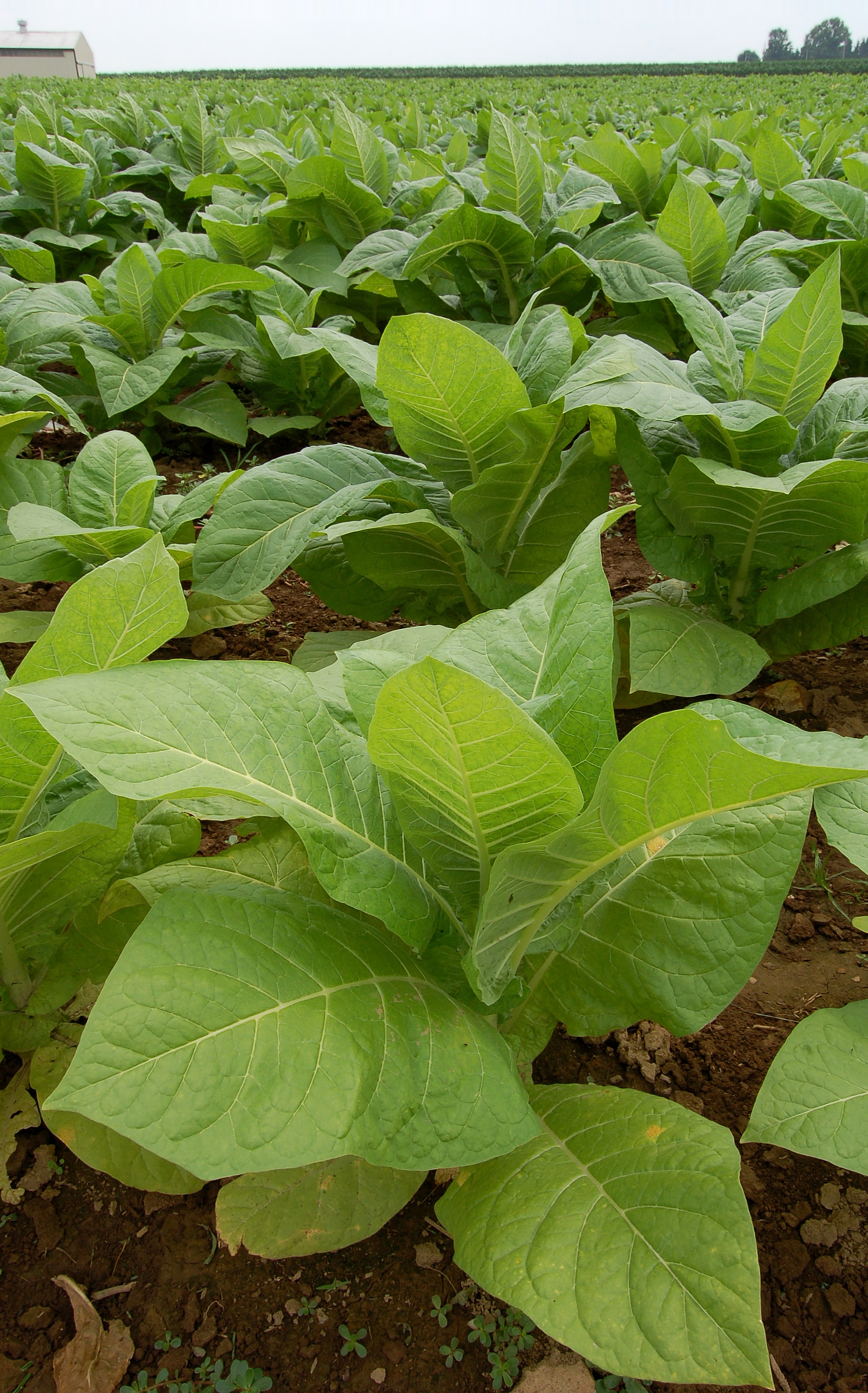
A tobacco field in the United States

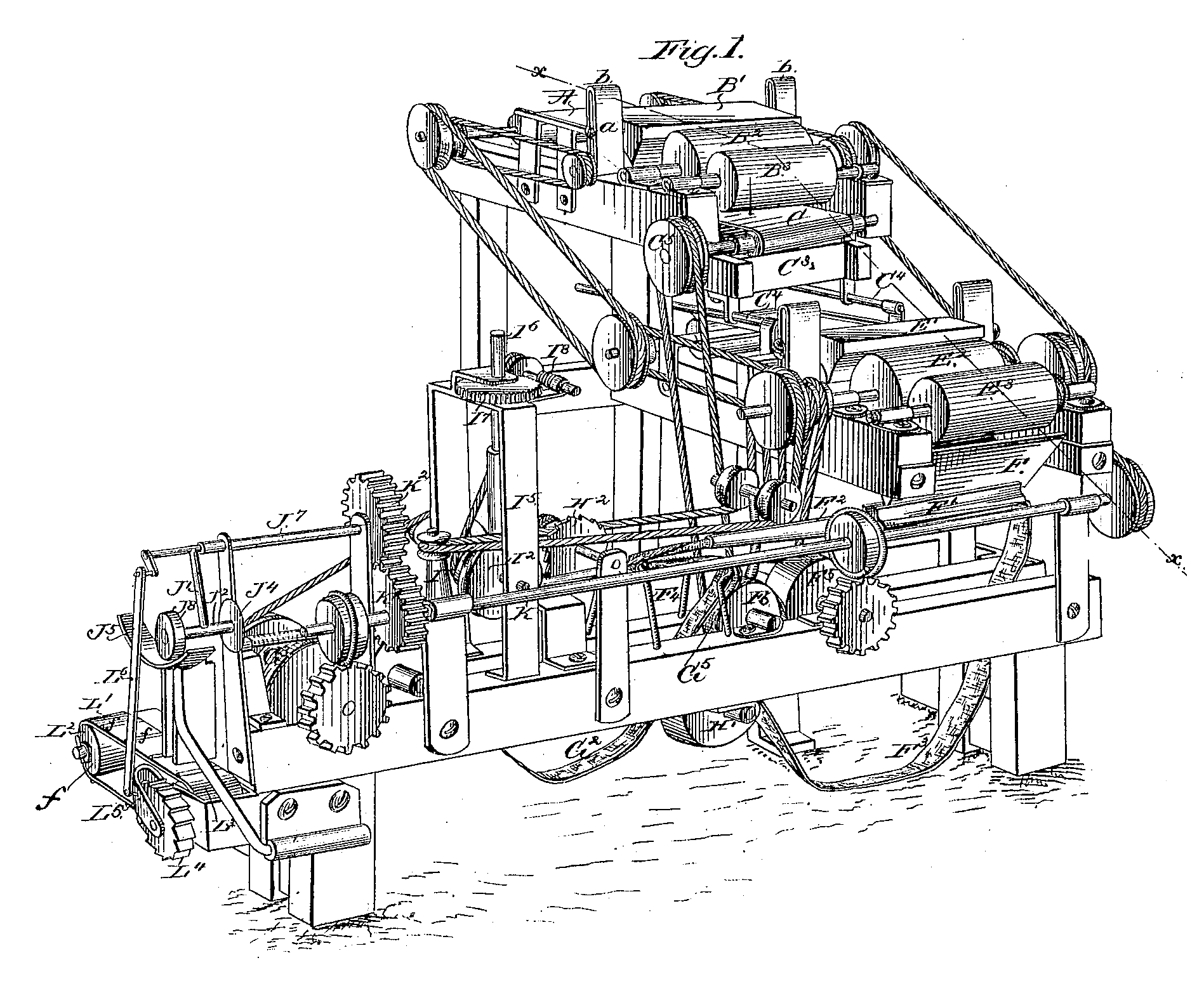
James Albert Bonsack's cigarette rolling machine, invented in 1880 and patented in 1881.

Commercial tobacco production in colonial America dates back to the 17th century, when the first commercial crops were planted. The industry originated in the production of tobacco to be used in pipes and snuff. Tobacco cultivation near Jamestown, Virginia Colony, in 1610 was the beginning of the plant's development as a cash crop. By the beginning of the 18th century, tobacco became a significant economic force in the American colonies. Tobacco use had also become common in early American society and was heavily consumed before and after the declaration of American independence in 1776.

By the beginning of the 18th century, tobacco became a significant economic force in the American colonies, especially in Virginia's tidewater region surrounding Chesapeake Bay. Vast plantations were built along rivers, and socioeconomic systems were developed to grow and distribute the crop. In 1713, the Virginia General Assembly (under the leadership of Governor Alexander Spotswood) passed a Tobacco Act requiring the inspection of all tobacco intended for export or for use as legal tender. American tobacco farmers sold their crops on consignment to merchants in London, which required them to take out loans for farm expenses from London guarantors in exchange for tobacco delivery and sale. As the demand for tobacco grew in continental Europe, further colonization and tobacco production in British America saw a parallel increase, and tobacco cultivation spread into Britain's other Southern Colonies and beyond. A brisk trade developed among wholesalers in Charleston and New Orleans to ship tobacco to London merchants. Tobacco use had also become common in early American society and was heavily consumed before and after the declaration of American independence in 1776.

With the advent of the American Revolution (1765–1783), trade with the colonies was interrupted, and this shifted the tobacco trade to other countries. There was, however, an increase in demand for tobacco in the United States, where the use of cigars and chewing tobacco increased. The War of 1812 would introduce the Andalusian cigarette to the rest of Europe, and from 1880, production of tobacco in the United States increasingly focused on the manufactured cigarette.

In 1880, James Albert Bonsack invented an automatic cigarette rolling machine. In the early 20th century, cigarette production and smoking grew rapidly, with the automatic cigarette rolling machines and massive tobacco advertising.

== Legislation ==
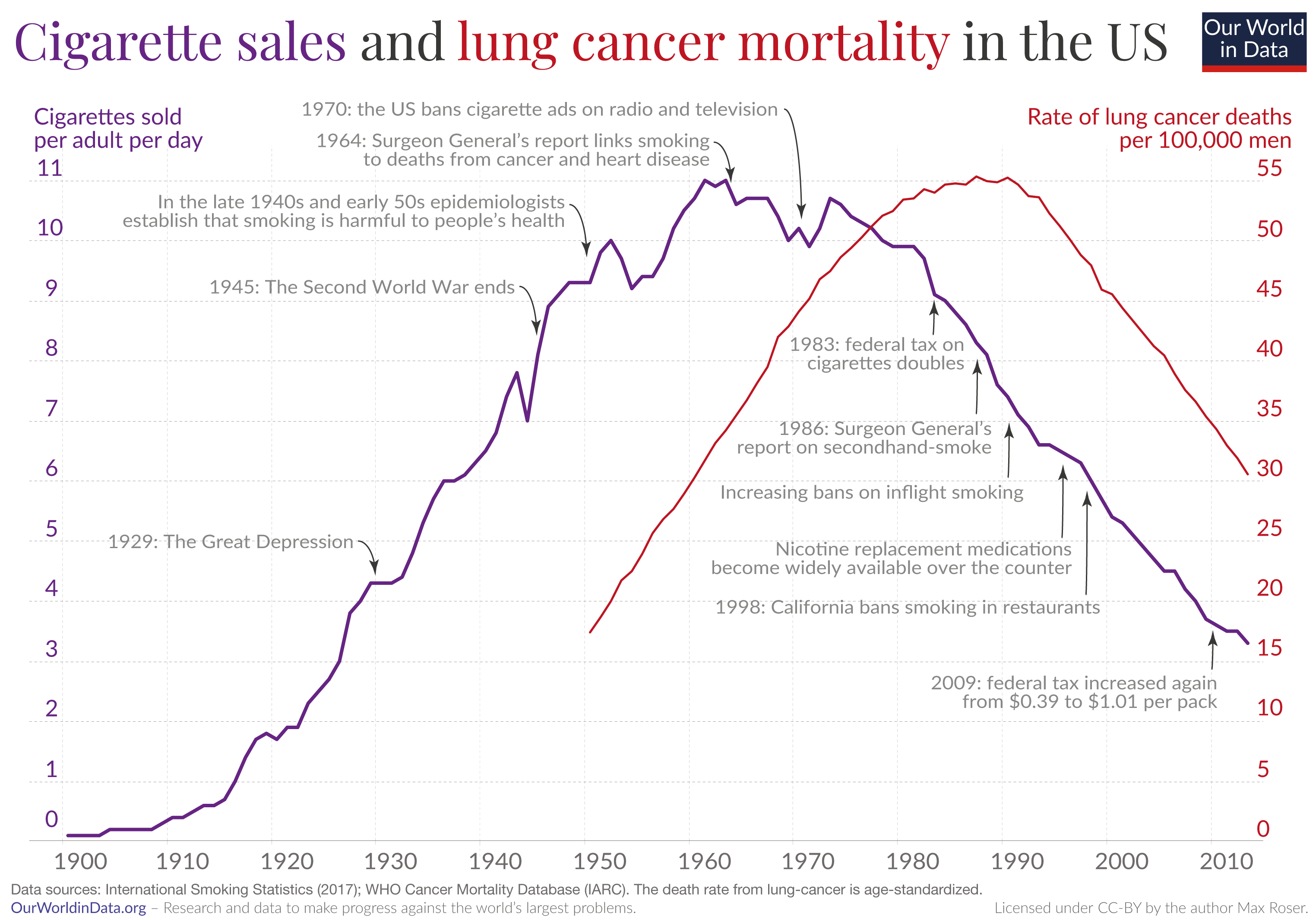
Cigarette sales and lung cancer mortality in the United States.

In the 1950s, scientific evidence clearly showed that smoking cause lung cancer. In 1966, the first warning messages appeared on cigarette packs, stating "Caution: cigarette smoking may be hazardous to your health". This warning was updated in 1970 and 1985.

In February 2009, the Children's Health Insurance Program Reauthorization Act of 2009 was signed into law, raising the federal tax rate on cigarettes on from $0.39 per pack to $1.01 per pack, beginning April 1, 2009.

- Cigarette taxes in the United States
- No Net Cost Tobacco Act of 1982
- Family Smoking Prevention and Tobacco Control Act (2009)
- Planters' Protective Association
- Reality Check (organization)
- Tobacco Master Settlement Agreement (1988)
- Tobacco Price Support Program
- Tobacco Products Scientific Advisory Committee

== Tobacco lobbying and organizations ==
The U.S. tobacco industry, from its earliest advertising to its more recent public relations campaigns, has long portrayed smoking to be a harmless activity. A 1999 feature film, The Insider, centered on the production of a news segment about "Big Tobacco" and its communications methods. In the 21st century, the rising influence of social media in the United States has provided new generations of teenagers and young adults with a new platform for anti-smoking information. A prime example is TruthOrange, an organization that has approached YouTube's content creators with requests to sponsor their ads. Former and current tobacco and anti-tobacco lobbies in the United States include:

- Advancement of Sound Science Center
- DEBUNKIFY
- Tobacco Institute, which represents the U.S. tobacco industry
- Golden LEAF Foundation
- Youth Tobacco Cessation Collaborative
- WhiteLies.tv
- Truth (anti-tobacco campaign)

== Companies and practices ==
=== Marketing to the Black community ===
Historian Keith Wailoo argues that the U.S. cigarette industry especially targeted African Americans, starting in the 1960s. It took advantage of several converging trends: First was the increased national attention on the dangers of smoking itself. Cigarette companies then took the initiative in fighting back, developing and promoting menthol-flavored brands that they advertised as more soothing to the throat. The industry also advertised these as better for health. A second trend was the federal ban on tobacco advertising on radio and television in the 1970s. There was no corresponding ban on advertising in the print media, however, so cigarette makers responded with large-scale advertising in Black newspapers and magazines. They also erected billboards in inner-city neighborhoods. The third trend was the U.S. civil rights movement of the 1960s. Big Tobacco responded by investing heavily in the civil rights movement, winning the gratitude of many national and local leaders. Menthol-flavored cigarette brands systematically sponsored local events in the Black community and subsidized major black organizations, notably the National Association for the Advancement of Colored People (NAACP). Cigarette makers also subsidized churches and schools. Their marketing initiatives were a success, as the rate of smoking in the Black community grew, even while it declined among whites. Eventually, three out of four Black smokers in the United States purchased menthol cigarettes.

=== Child labor ===
An estimated half a million children worked in the fields of America picking food as of 2012, although the precise number working in tobacco fields is unknown. U.S. federal law provides no minimum age for work on small farms, and children ages twelve and up may work for hire on any size farm for unlimited periods outside school hours and with parental permission. According to Human Rights Watch, farm work is the most hazardous occupation open to children. In eastern North Carolina, a major tobacco state, children have been interviewed as young as 14 who worked harvesting tobacco, and recent news reports describe children as young as nine and ten doing such work.

== See also ==
- C. C. Little – tobacco researcher
- History of public health in the United States
- List of tobacco-related topics
- List of smoking bans in the United States
- Prevalence of tobacco consumption § United States
- Smoker Protection Law
- Smoking in the United States military
- Tobacco-free pharmacies
- Tobacco industry playbook
- Drug policy of Oregon § Tobacco
- United States v. Philip Morris
- U.S. government and smoking cessation
