= Tobacco Price Support Program =

The Tobacco Price Support Program used a combination of marketing quotas and nonrecourse loans to keep prices stable and higher than they would be otherwise in the United States. The tobacco quota limited production to raise prices. Nonrecourse loans allowed producers to hold tobacco stocks for long periods to balance supplies with market demand conditions.

Under the No Net Cost Tobacco Act of 1982, tobacco loan program operations were required to function at no net cost to taxpayers (P.L. 97-218). A no net cost assessment was collected on all leaf tobacco sold to build a reserve fund that reimbursed the Commodity Credit Corporation (CCC) for any losses of loan principal and interest. Adoption of the tobacco quota buyout in P.L. 108-357, Title VI, also ended the price support program for the crop in 2005 and subsequent years.
