= Production quota =

Production goal or limit

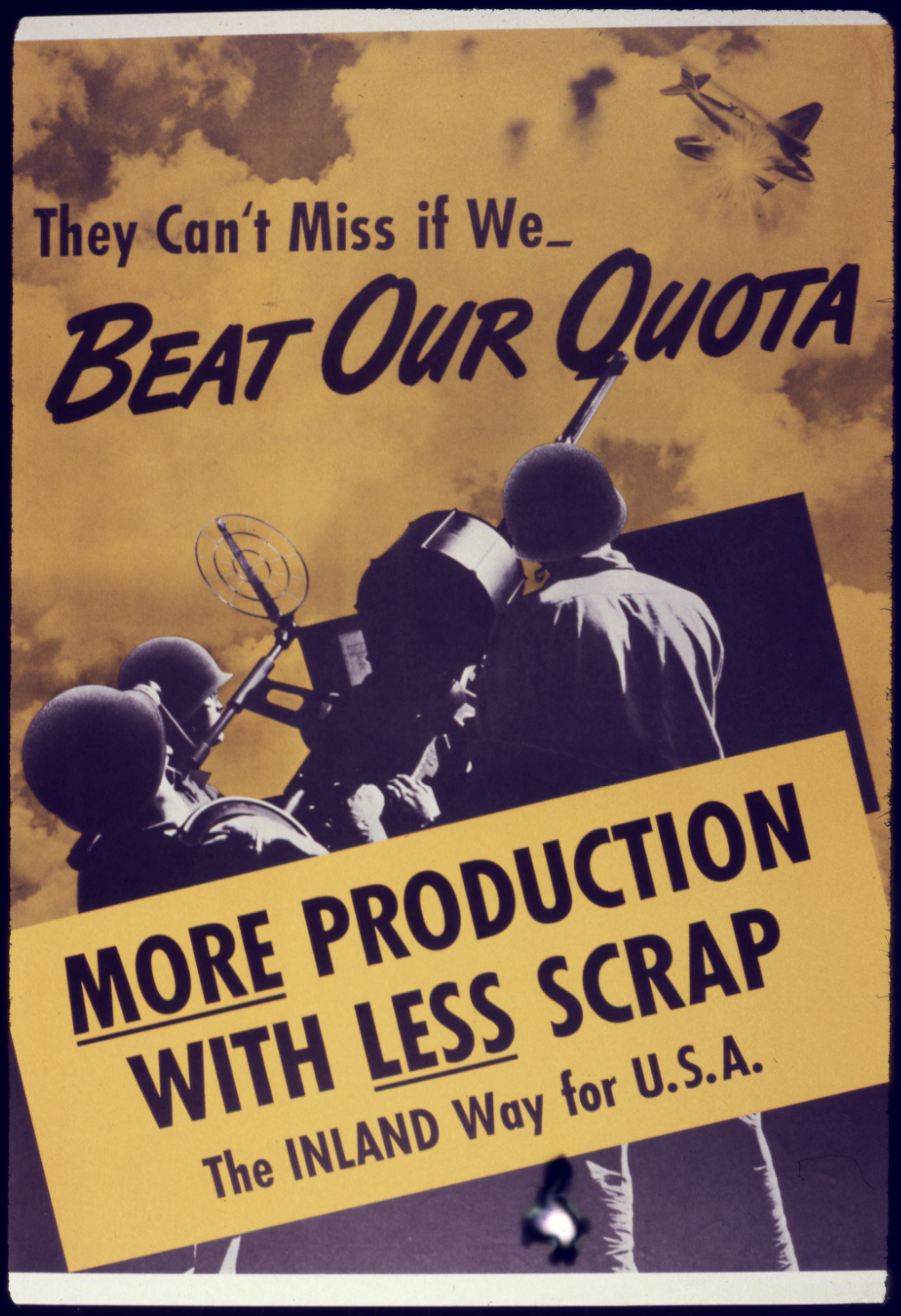
Poster of 1942 or 1943 encouraging the reduction of waste to reach production quotas

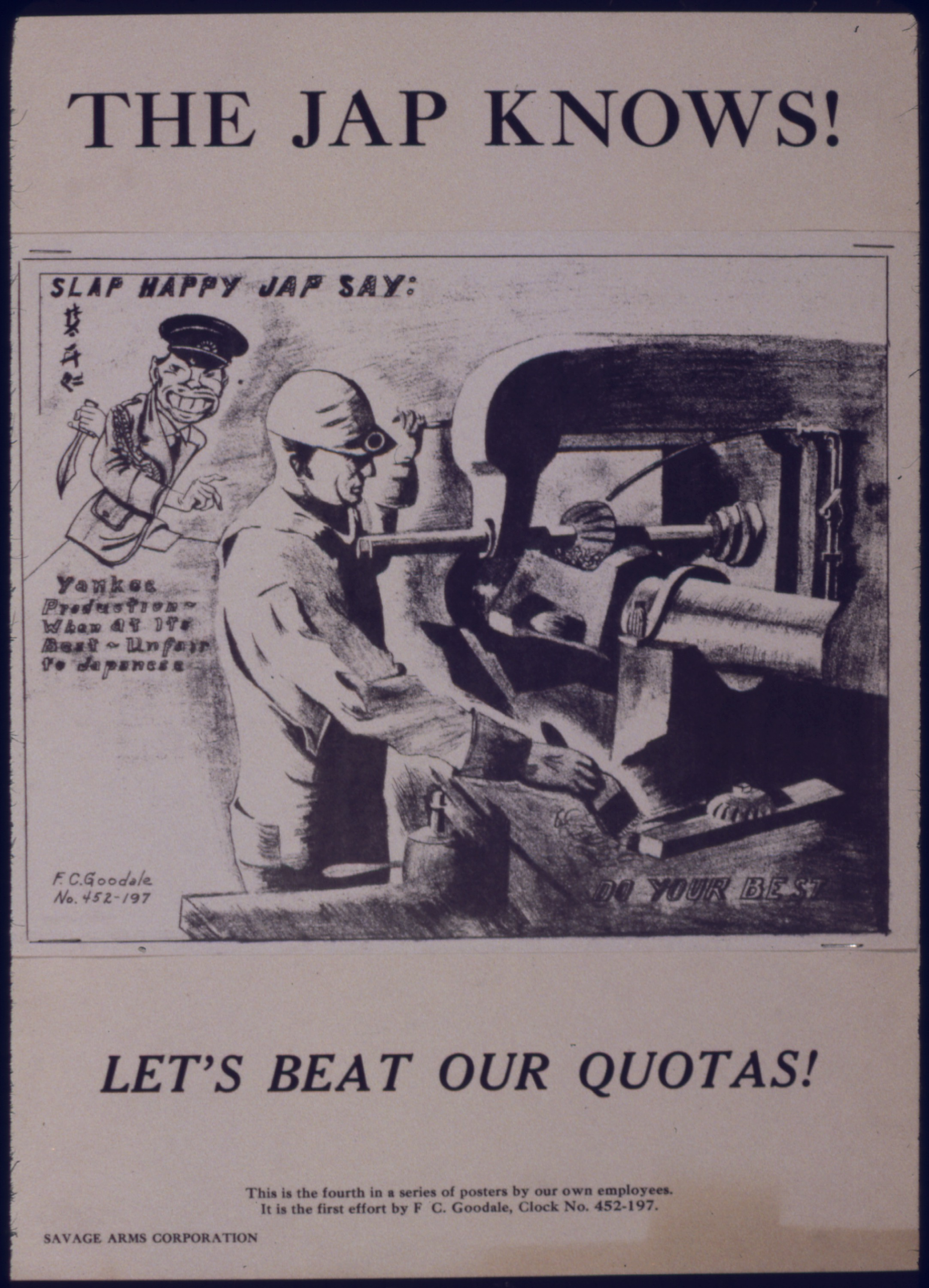
Poster of 1942 or 1943 encouraging American workers to reach production quotas

A production quota is a goal for the production of a good. It is typically set by a government or an organization, and can be applied to an individual worker, firm, industry or country. Quotas can be set high to encourage production, or can be used to restrict production to support a certain price level.

== Definition ==
A quota refers to a measure that limits, either minimum or maximum, on a particular activity. Quotas are usually enacted by governments or organizations to protect domestic industries. In short, it limits the number of goods a country can export or import during a certain period of time.

== Criticism ==
Quotas, like other trade restrictions, are typically used to benefit the producers of a good at the expense of consumers in that economy. Possible effects include corruption (bribes to increase a quota allocation) or smuggling (concealed actions to exceed a quota).

Quotas may also create deadweight loss. When a production quota has been added, there is a loss in consumer surplus and creation of deadweight loss. This triangle is also known as the "Harberger Triangle".

== Examples ==
=== Crude oil ===
- Oil production by OPEC

The Organization of the Petroleum Exporting Countries (OPEC) is a key example of an organization that uses production quotas. The 14 member states set a production quota for crude oil, with the intention of maintaining the cost of crude oil per barrel in world markets.

=== Agricultural produce ===
- Common Agricultural Policy by the European Union
  - European Union milk quotas capped production from 1984 to 2015
- Agricultural policy of the United States during the Great Depression. Many production quotas were implemented. The purpose was to restrict the levels of production below competitive levels, which would increase the producer's income. This was important when the price of agricultural products in the global markets had taken a dramatic decline.
  - Poundage quotas under the Agricultural Adjustment Act of 1938 and successor laws in the United States. The peanut poundage quota ended in 2002, and the tobacco quota ended in 2005.
- Market Sharing Quota, dairy production quotas in Canada

=== Hunting ===
- Individual fishing quota

=== Other ===
- A 10-percent increase in production quotas for construction workers triggered the Uprising of 1953 in East Germany.

== See also ==
- Import quota
- Planned economy
