= Economic System of Socialism =

East German economic policy (1968–1970)

The Economic System of Socialism (ESS) was an economic policy implemented in East Germany between 1968 and 1970, which was introduced and led by the country's leader, Walter Ulbricht. It focused on high technology sectors in an attempt to make self-sufficient growth possible. Overall, centralized planning was reintroduced in the so-called structure-determining areas, which included electronics, chemicals, and plastics. Industrial combines were formed to vertically integrate industries involved in the manufacture of vital final products. Price subsidies were restored to accelerate growth in favored sectors.

The annual plan for 1968 set production quotas 2.6% higher in the structure-determining areas than in the remaining sectors in order to achieve industrial growth in these areas. The state set the 1969–1970 goals for high-technology sectors even higher still. Failure to meet the ESS's goals resulted in the termination of the reform effort in 1970.

== Background ==
In order to pacify the critics and to show that the New Economic System was compatible with socialism, at the 7th SED congress in April 1967, Ulbricht renamed his economic reforms as the Economic System of Socialism (ESS). From 1968, greater state control over the economy was reintroduced to achieve accelerated growth in selected segments. A new central plan was meant to prioritize and direct development of these preferred structure-determining projects, while the rest of economy was supposed to continue with the NES.

== "Great leap" ==
As the GDR was unable to catch up with the West, the idea was to invest heavily to achieve a "leap" in the most modern industries of the time and then to reap profits from exporting products that would be a generation ahead of the West. At the time, the Soviet Union was advancing technologically in the space race faster than the United States, so socialist optimism was at its peak.

The increasingly technocratic Ulbricht saw a scientific-technological revolution as the quickest way forward for the GDR.

ESS was introduced under the slogan "overtaking without catching up" (überholen ohne einzuholen). Ulbricht, instead of trying to make the whole economy grow, concentrated all state efforts and investments on a few high-growth industries that were expected to bring the greatest returns. In these selected industries, the GDR hoped to “overtake” West Germany without the whole economy of the GDR "catching up" with West Germany.

The first list of structure-determining projects was created by the Council of Ministers in June 1967. The main areas of development were chemicals (petrochemicals and artificial fibers), engineering (machine tools and plant construction), electronics, data processing equipment, and automation technologies.

== Growing state debt ==
As the GDR lacked its own resources, it asked for more support from the USSR, and also began borrowing from the West. Ulbricht described the whole idea as:

It is straightforward: We get as much debt with the capitalists, up to the limits of possibility, so that we can pull through in some way. A part of the products from the new plants must be then exported back to where we bought the machines and took on debt.

== Problems created by the ESS ==
Concentration of most investments into some sectors led to shortages in others. During 1969 and 1970, shortages of consumer goods and problems in the industrial sector led to increased complaints from the people, factory managers, and party officials. Even proponents of the NES and the ESS were dissatisfied with the way that their plans were implemented.

During December 1970 there were strikes and industrial unrest in neighboring Poland. They ended only after the military moved in to suppress them. To the GDR conservatives and Soviets, this showed clearly the risks that the GDR could be facing if Ulbricht continued with his programs.

== Fall of Ulbricht ==
Constant changes of economic policies were perceived as threatening to socialism, the SED regime, the working class of the GDR, and eventually alienated the USSR under Brezhnev. The Prague Spring of 1968 also demonstrated the risks of any liberalization.

Alfred Neumann, a member of the Politburo wrote to Ulbricht on April 18, 1969:

Should we put up the slogan "the GDR must become better than West Germany in the economic area"? That will not do! That does not fit into our constitution, or our socialist national and state consciousness.

In 1970, inner-party and Politburo criticism of the EES gradually increased. At the 14th SED plenum in December 1970, Ulbricht's economic policy was sharply criticized by those who opposed the ESS for political reasons and those who opposed it for the disruptions it caused to the economy. His main opponents were Erich Honecker, Willi Stoph and Alfred Neumann.

In May 1970, Ulbricht was removed from power and left with a purely ceremonial role as the Chairman of the State Council of GDR, which he held until his death in 1973.

In 1971, Honecker put forward a new program that called for the "unity of economic and social policy" by building a socialist working class state where the economy is put to the service of political goals. The goal of the GDR was now not to be better than the capitalists, but to create a different political system. This was promoted especially with the 1974 amendments to the GDR's constitution.

== See also ==
- Eastern Bloc economies
- New Course
- New Economic System
