= Walter Ulbricht =

Leader of East Germany from 1949 to 1971

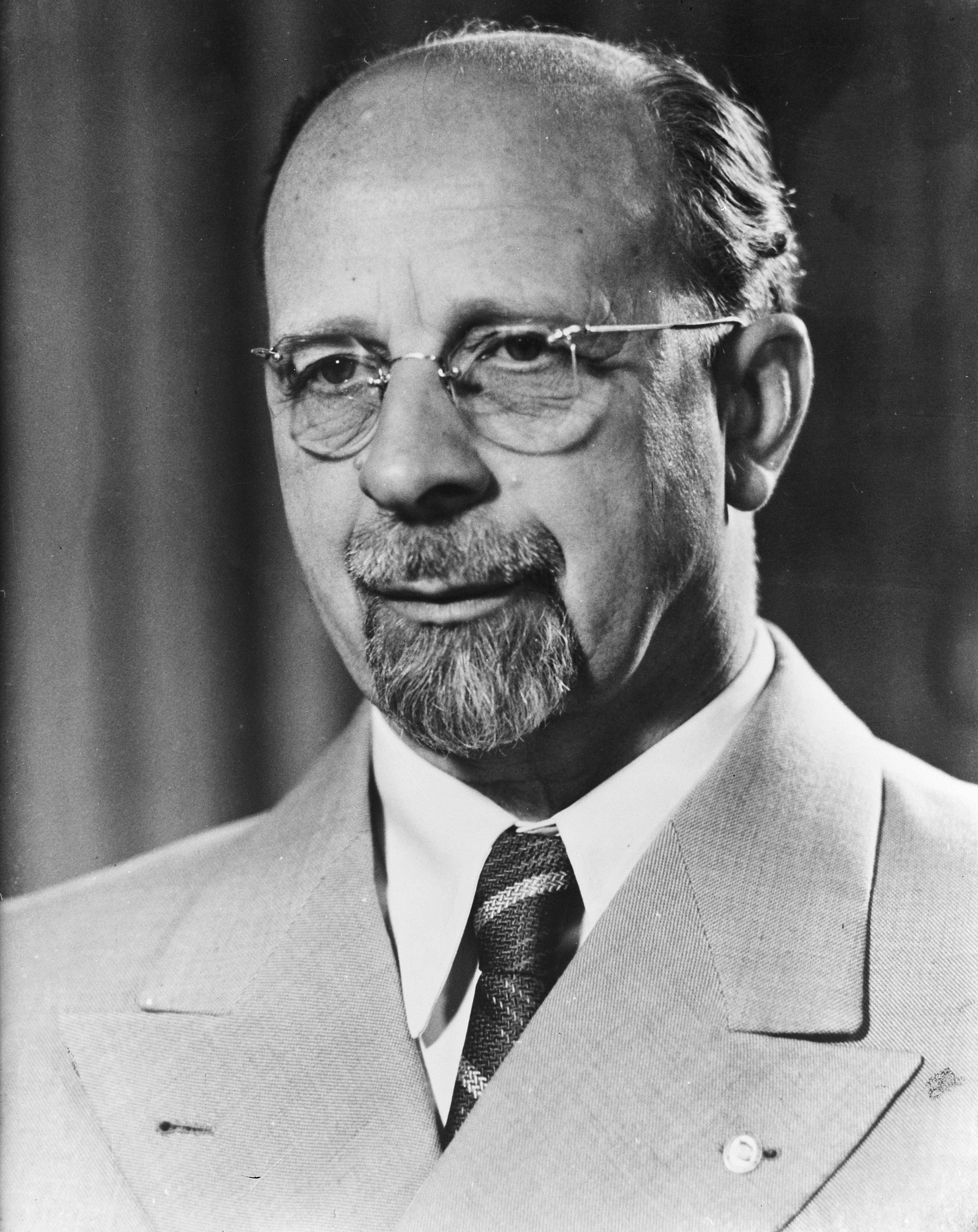
- Ulbricht in 1960

First Secretary of the Socialist Unity Party (Note: Titled General Secretary until 1953)
- In office 25 July 1950 – 3 May 1971
- Deputy: Karl Schirdewan; Erich Honecker
- Preceded by: Wilhelm Pieck; Otto Grotewohl
- Succeeded by: Erich Honecker

Chairman of the State Council
- In office 12 September 1960 – 1 August 1973
- Preceded by: Wilhelm Pieck (as President of East Germany)
- Succeeded by: Friedrich Ebert Jr. (acting)

Chairman of the National Defense Council
- In office 11 February 1960 – 3 May 1971
- Secretary: Erich Honecker
- Preceded by: Office established
- Succeeded by: Erich Honecker

First Deputy Chairman of the Council of Ministers (Note: "Deputy Minister-President" until 24 November 1955, then "First Deputy Minister-President" until 8 December 1958)
- In office 7 October 1949 – 12 September 1960
- Chairman: Otto Grotewohl
- Preceded by: Position established
- Succeeded by: Willi Stoph (1962)
Parliamentary constituencies
Member of the Volkskammer for Leipzig – Stadtbezirk Südwest, Stadtbezirk West, Stadtbezirk Nord, Stadtbezirk Nordost
In office 18 March 1948 – 1 August 1973
Preceded by	Constituency established
Succeeded by	Margot Weilert
Member of the Reichstag for Westfalen Süd
In office 1 July 1928 – 28 February 1933
Preceded by	Multi-member district
Succeeded by	Constituency abolished
Member of the Landtag of Saxony
In office 25 November 1926 – 21 March 1929
Preceded by	Multi-member district
Succeeded by	Multi-member district

Central Committee Secretariat (Note: Party Executive Committee Central Secretariat until July 1950.) responsibilities
- 1952–1953: KPD Work Office
- 1952–1953: West Department
- 1950–1966: International Relations
- 1949–1957: Church Affairs
- 1949–1956: Cadre Affairs
- 1946–1958: State and Legal Affairs
- 1946–1956: Security Affairs
- 1946–1950: Economic Policy

Personal details
- Born: Walter Ernst Paul Ulbricht; 30 June 1893 Leipzig, Germany
- Died: 1 August 1973 (aged 80) Templin, East Germany
- Resting place: Zentralfriedhof Friedrichsfelde
- Party: SPD (1912–1917); USPD (1917–1920); KPD (1920–1946); SED (1946–1973)
- Spouse(s): Martha Schmellinsky (m. 1920; div. 1949) Lotte Kühn (m. 1953)
- Children: 3, including Beate
- Occupation: Politician; Joiner

Military service
- Allegiance: German Empire
- Branch/service: Imperial German Army
- Years of service: 1915–1918
- Rank: Gefreiter
- Battles/wars: World War I; Eastern Front; Macedonian front; Western Front; German Revolution
- Central institution membership: 1949–1973: Full member, Politburo of the Central Committee; 1946–1973: Full member, Central Committee (Note: Party Executive Committee until 1950); 1930–1937: Full member, KPD Politburo; 1927–1946: Full member, KPD Central Committee; 1923–1924: Full member, KPD Zentrale; Other offices held: 1960–1973: Member, State Council; 1960–1973: Member, National Defence Council; 1954–1960: Member, Security Commission at the Politburo; 1946–1951: Member, Landtag of Saxony-Anhalt; 1946–1950: Deputy Chairman, Socialist Unity Party; 1929–1932: Political Leader, Berlin-Brandenberg KPD; 1921–1923: Political Leader, Thuringia KPD
- De facto leader of the GDR: ← (First in role); Honecker →

Walter Ernst Paul Ulbricht (/ˈʊlbrɪxt/; German: [ˈvaltɐ ˈʔʊlbʁɪçt]; 30 June 1893 – 1 August 1973) was a German communist politician who served as the leader of East Germany from 1949 to 1971. Ulbricht played a leading role in the creation of the Weimar-era Communist Party of Germany (KPD) and the early development of East Germany. As the First Secretary of the Communist Socialist Unity Party from 1950 to 1971, he was the chief decision-maker in the country. From President Wilhelm Pieck's death in 1960, he was also the East German head of state until his own death in 1973. Widely regarded as a dictator, Ulbricht demanded the building of the Berlin Wall in 1961.

Ulbricht began his political life during the German Empire, when he joined first the Social Democratic Party of Germany (SPD) in 1912 later joining the anti-World War I Independent Social Democratic Party of Germany (USPD) in 1917. The following year, he deserted the Imperial German Army and took part in the German Revolution of 1918. He joined the Communist Party of Germany in 1920 and became a leading party functionary, serving in its Central Committee from 1923 onward. After the Nazi takeover of Germany in 1933 and the Nazi-led investigation into his role in ordering the 1931 murder of police captains Paul Anlauf and Franz Lenck, Ulbricht lived in Paris and Prague from 1933 to 1937 and in the Soviet Union from 1937 to 1945.

After the end of World War II, Ulbricht re-organized the German Communist Party in the Soviet occupation zone along Stalinist lines. He played a key role in the forcible merger of the KPD and SPD into the Socialist Unity Party of Germany (SED) in 1946. He became the First Secretary of the SED and effective leader of the recently established East Germany in 1950. The Soviet Army occupation force violently suppressed the uprising of 1953 in East Germany on 17 June 1953, while Ulbricht hid in the Soviet Army headquarters in Berlin-Karlshorst. East Germany joined the Soviet-controlled Warsaw Pact upon its founding in 1955. Ulbricht presided over the total suppression of civil and political rights in the East German state, which functioned as a communist-ruled dictatorship from its founding in 1949 onward.

The nationalization of East German industry under Ulbricht failed to raise the standard of living to a level comparable to that of West Germany. The result was massive emigration, with hundreds of thousands of people fleeing the country to the west every year in the 1950s. When Soviet Premier Nikita Khrushchev gave permission for a wall to stop the outflow in Berlin, Ulbricht had the Berlin Wall built in 1961, which triggered a diplomatic crisis but succeeded in curtailing emigration. The failures of Ulbricht's New Economic System and Economic System of Socialism from 1963 to 1970 led to his forcible retirement for "health reasons" and replacement as First Secretary in 1971 by Erich Honecker with Soviet approval. Ulbricht remained the symbolic head of state for two more years, suffering from declining health until dying of a stroke in August 1973.

== Early years ==
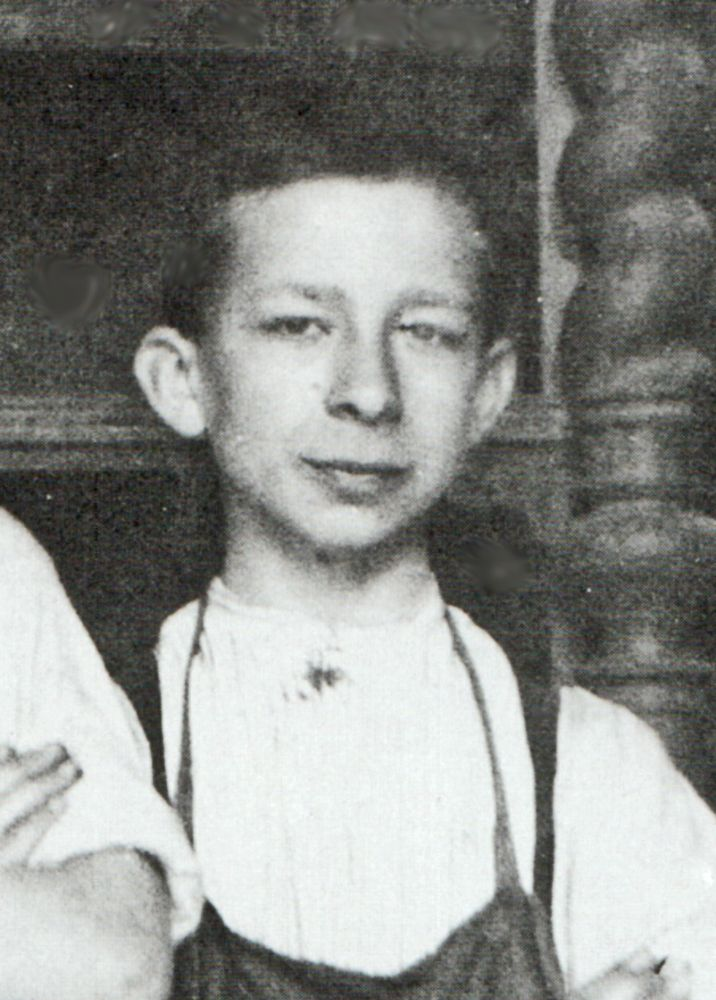
Ulbricht, age 14, at the beginning of his joinery apprenticeship

Ulbricht was born on 30 June 1893 in Leipzig, Saxony, into a Protestant family to Pauline Ida (née Rothe) and Ernst August Ulbricht, an impoverished tailor. He spent eight years in primary school (Volksschule) and this constituted all of his formal education since he left school to train as a joiner. Both his parents worked actively for the Social Democratic Party (SPD), which Walter joined in 1912. The young Ulbricht first learned about radical socialism at home in Leipzig's Naundörfchen workers' district before they moved to the Gottschedstrasse.

== First World War and the German Revolution ==
Ulbricht served in the Imperial German Army during World War I from 1915 to 1917 in Galicia, on the Eastern Front, and in the Balkans. He deserted the Army in 1918, as he had opposed the war from the beginning. For this, he was sentenced to two months in prison. Shortly after his release, while stationed in Brussels, Ulbricht was arrested for having anti-war leaflets. He avoided further prosecution when the November Revolution broke due to collapse of Imperial Germany.

In 1917 he became a member of the Independent Social Democratic Party (USPD) after it split off from the Social Democratic Party over support of Germany's participation in World War I.

During the German Revolution of 1918, Ulbricht became a member of the soldier's soviet of his army corps. In 1919, he joined the Spartakusbund.

== The Weimar years ==
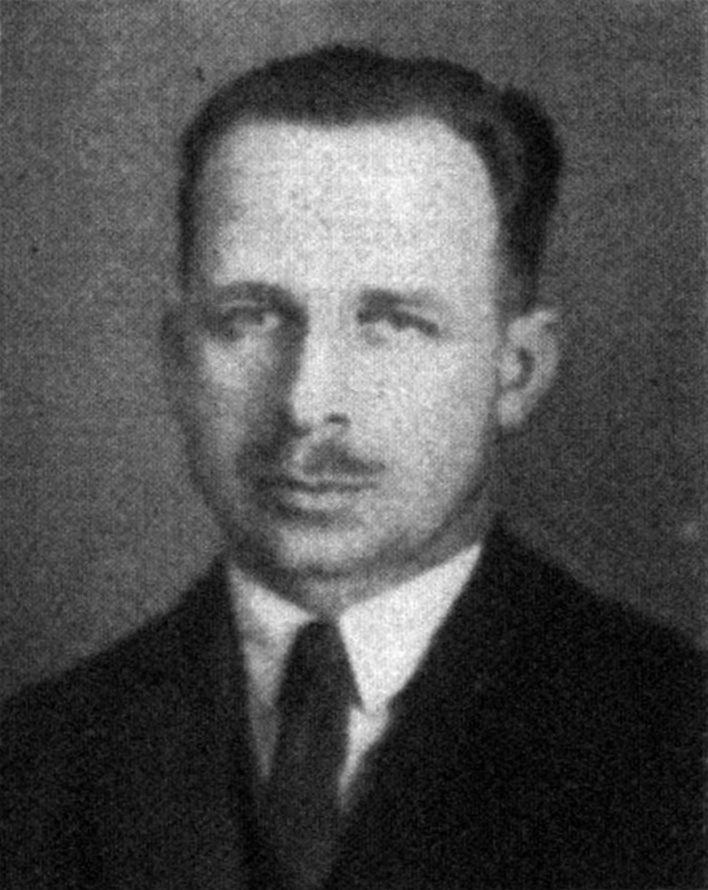
Ulbricht's official Reichstag portrait, 1930

Along with the bulk of the USPD, he joined the KPD in 1920 and became one of its active organizers. He rose fast in the ranks of the KPD, becoming a member of the Central Committee in 1923. Ulbricht was an adherent of the Lenin model, which favored a highly centralized party. Ulbricht attended the International Lenin School of the Comintern in Moscow in 1924/1925. He came home in 1926 and went on to assist the newly appointed party chief Ernst Thälmann. The electors subsequently voted him into the regional parliament of Saxony (Sächsischer Landtag) in 1926. He became a Member of the Reichstag for South Westphalia from 1928 to 1933 and served as KPD chairman in Berlin and Brandenburg from 1929 to 1932.

In the years before the 1933 Nazi election to power, paramilitary wings of Marxist and extreme nationalist parties provoked massive riots connected with demonstrations. Besides the Berlin Police, the KPD's arch-enemies were street-fighters like the Nazi Party's SA, the monarchist German National People's Party's Stahlhelm, and Stormtroopers affiliated with "radical nationalist parties". The Social Democratic Party of Germany and its paramilitary Reichsbanner forces, which dominated local and national politics from 1918 to 1931 and which the KPD accused of "social fascism", were their most detested foe. Ulbricht quickly became a KPD functionary and this was attributed to the Bolshevization of the party.

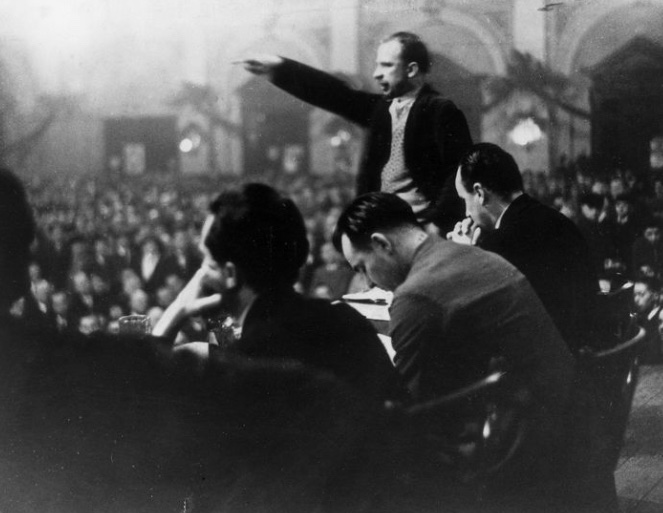
Ulbricht (standing in the background) speaking at a debate between himself and Joseph Goebbels in the Friedrichshain. Goebbels is visible on the left in the foreground. The debate ended in a massive brawl between Nazis and the KPD.

At an event arranged by the Nazi Party on 22 January 1931, Ulbricht was allowed by Joseph Goebbels, the Nazi Party's Gauleiter of Berlin and Brandenburg, to give a speech. Subsequently, Goebbels delivered his own speech. The attempt at a friendly discussion turned hostile and became a debate. A struggle between Nazis and Communists began: police officers divided them. Both sides had tried to use this event for their election propaganda. The brawl took two hours to disperse and over a hundred were injured in the melee.

=== The Bülowplatz murders ===
During the last days of the Weimar Republic, the KPD had a policy of assassinating two Berlin police officers in retaliation for every KPD member killed by the police.

On 2 August 1931, KPD members of the Reichstag Heinz Neumann and Hans Kippenberger received a dressing down from Ulbricht, who was the party's leader in the Berlin-Brandenburg region. According to John Koehler, enraged by police interference and by Neumann and Kippenberger's failure to follow the policy, Ulbricht snarled, "At home in Saxony we would have done something about the police a long time ago. Here in Berlin we will not fool around much longer. Soon we will hit the police in the head."

Kippenberger and Neumann decided to assassinate Paul Anlauf, the captain of the Berlin Police's Seventh Precinct. Captain Anlauf had been nicknamed Schweinebacke, or "Pig Face" by the KPD. Anlauf was notorious for his brutal methods in breaking up Communist-led demonstrations at the time.

According to John Koehler, "Of all the policemen in strife-torn Berlin, the reds hated Anlauf the most. His precinct included the area around KPD headquarters, which made it the most dangerous in the city. The captain almost always led the riot squads that broke up illegal rallies of the Communist Party."

In 1934, the Nazi government erected a memorial to Anlauf and Lenck at the square where they were killed, then renamed Horst-Wessel-Platz after a Nazi martyr. In 1950 the socialist German government destroyed the monument and the square was renamed Rosa-Luxemburg-Platz.

== Nazi and war years ==
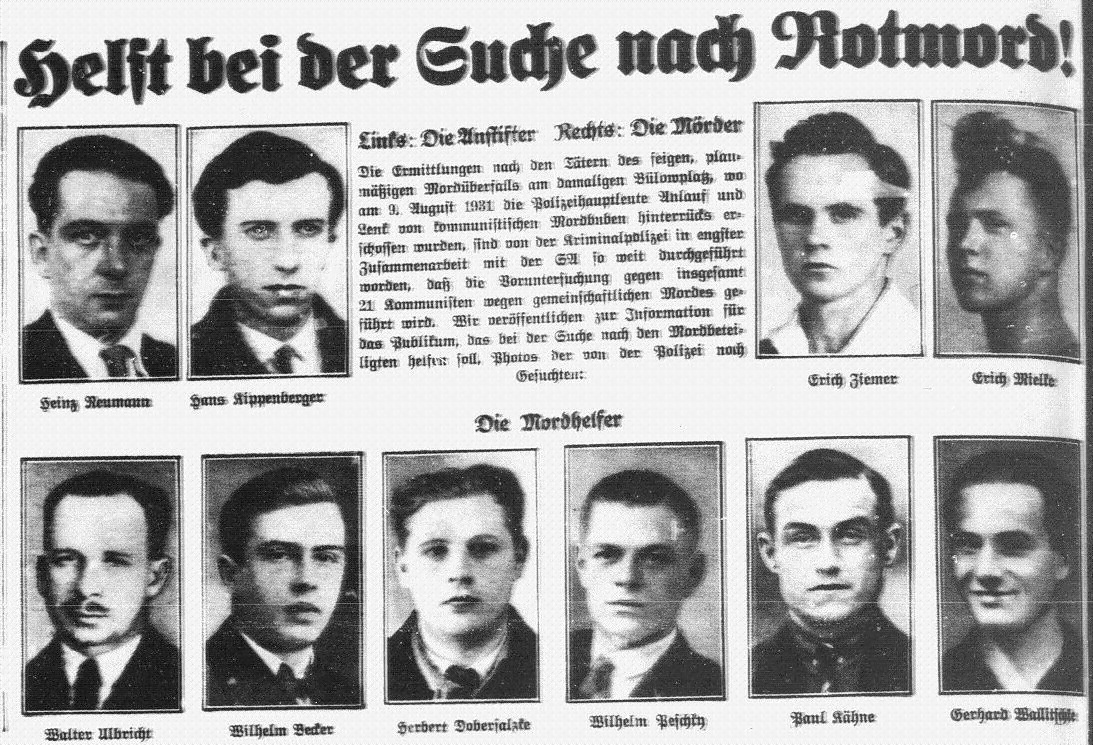
"Help with the Search for the Red Murderers": Ulbricht (bottom left) on a wanted poster for the killing of Anlauf and Lenck, 1933

The Nazi Party attained power in Germany in January 1933, and very quickly began a purge of Communist and Social Democrat leaders in Germany. Following the arrest of the KPD's leader, Ernst Thälmann, Ulbricht campaigned to be Thälmann's replacement as head of the party.

Ulbricht lived in exile in Paris and Prague from 1933 to 1937. The German Popular Front under the leadership of Heinrich Mann in Paris was dissolved after a campaign of behind-the-scenes jockeying by Ulbricht to place the organization under the control of the Comintern. Ulbricht tried to persuade the KPD founder Willi Münzenberg to go to the Soviet Union, allegedly so that Ulbricht could have "them take care of him". Münzenberg refused. He would have been in jeopardy of arrest and purge by the NKVD, a prospect in both Münzenberg's and Ulbricht's minds. Ulbricht spent some time in Spain during the Civil War, as a Comintern representative, ensuring the murder of Germans serving on the Republican side who were regarded as not sufficiently loyal to Soviet leader Joseph Stalin; some were sent to Moscow for trial, others were executed on the spot. Ulbricht lived in the Soviet Union from 1937 to 1945, leaving from Hotel Lux to return to Germany on 30 April 1945.

At the time of the signing of the Molotov–Ribbentrop Pact, in August 1939, Ulbricht and the rest of the German Communist Party had supported the treaty.

Following the German invasion of the Soviet Union in June 1941, Ulbricht was active in a group of German communists under NKVD supervision called the National Committee for a Free Germany (a group including, among others, the poet Erich Weinert and the writer Willi Bredel) which, among other things, translated propaganda material into German, prepared broadcasts directed at the invaders, and interrogated captured German officers. In February 1943, following the surrender of the German Sixth Army at the close of the Battle of Stalingrad, Ulbricht, Weinert and Wilhelm Pieck conducted a Communist political rally in the center of Stalingrad which many German prisoners were forced to attend.

== Post-war political career ==
=== Role in communist takeover of East Germany ===
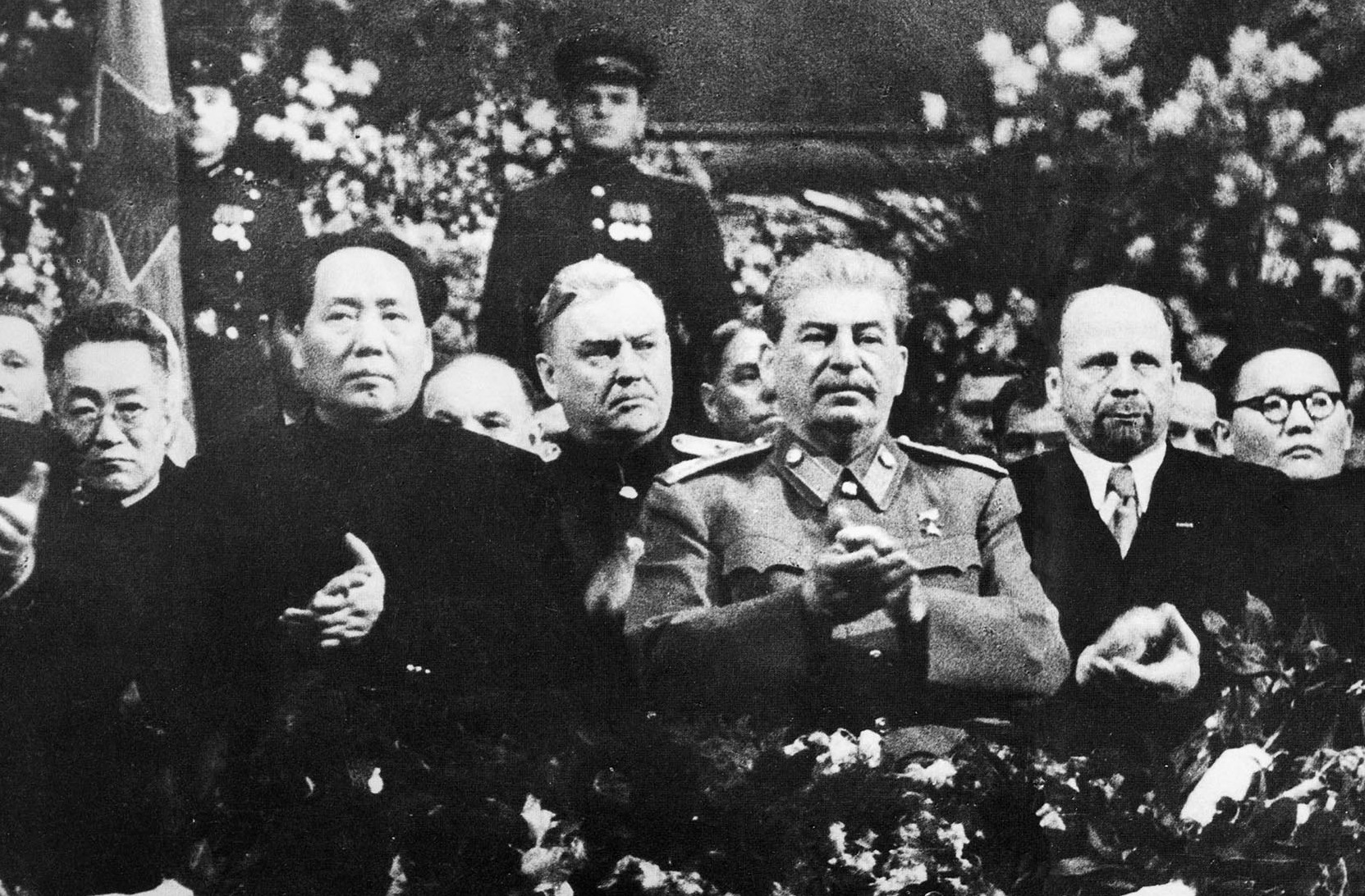
Mao Zedong, Stalin, Ulbricht, Bulganin and Tsedenbal at Stalin's 70th birthday celebrations in Moscow, December 1949

In April 1945, Ulbricht led a group of party functionaries ("Ulbricht Group") into Germany to begin reconstruction of the communist party along anti-revisionist lines. According to Grieder, "Espousing the motto 'it must look democratic but we must control everything'," he worked to set up an undisguised Communist regime in the Soviet zone. Within the Soviet occupied zone of Germany, the Social Democrats were pressured into merging with the Communists to form the Socialist Unity Party of Germany (Sozialistische Einheitspartei Deutschlands or SED), and Ulbricht played a key role in this. The merger was almost entirely on Communist terms, and most of the recalcitrant members of the SPD half were soon pushed out, leaving the SED as a renamed and enlarged KPD.

=== Rise to power ===
After the founding of the German Democratic Republic on 7 October 1949, Ulbricht became deputy chairman (Stellvertreter des Vorsitzenden) of the Council of Ministers (Ministerrat der DDR) under Minister-President and chairman Otto Grotewohl, i.e., deputy prime minister. In 1950, as the SED restructured itself along more orthodox Soviet lines, he became General Secretary of the SED Central Committee, replacing Grotewohl and State President Wilhelm Pieck as co-chairmen. This position was renamed First Secretary in 1953.

== Leadership of East Germany ==
=== Consolidation of authority ===
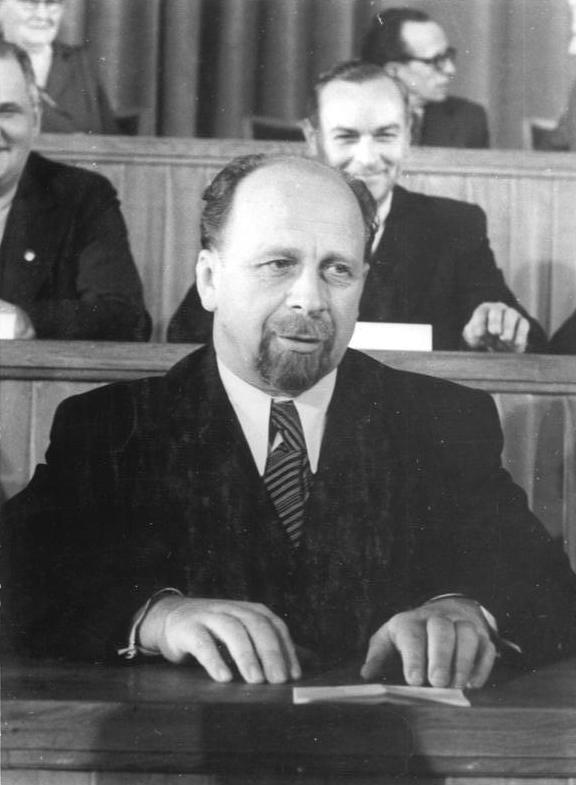
Ulbricht addresses the People's Chamber in 1950. His modeling of his beard on that of Lenin did not go unremarked by contemporaries.

After the death of Stalin (whose funeral was attended by Ulbricht, Grotewohl and other German communists) in March of that year, Ulbricht's position was in danger because Moscow was considering taking a soft line regarding Germany.

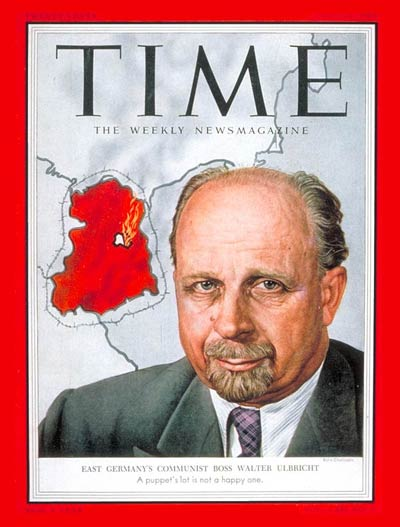
Walter Ulbricht on the cover of Time- 13 July 1953

The June 1953 East German uprising forced Moscow to turn to a hardliner, and his reputation as an archetypal Stalinist helped Ulbricht. On 16 June 1953, a protest erupted at East Berlin's Stalin Allee as enraged workers demanded comprehensive economic reforms. The East German police had to call in Soviet military units stationed in the city to help suppress the demonstration and communist rule was restored after several dozen deaths and 1,000 arrests. He was summoned to Moscow in July 1953, where he received the Kremlin's full endorsement as leader of East Germany. He returned to Berlin and he took the lead in calling in Soviet troops to suppress the widespread unrest with full backing from Moscow and its large army stationed inside the GDR. His position as leader of the GDR was now secure. The frustrations led many to flee to the West: over 360,000 did so in 1952 and the early part of 1953.

Ulbricht managed to rise to power despite having a peculiarly squeaky falsetto voice, the result of a bout of diphtheria in his youth. His Upper Saxon accent, combined with the high register of his voice, made his speeches sound incomprehensible at times.

=== Construction of a socialist society in GDR ===
At the third congress of the SED in 1950, Ulbricht announced a five-year plan concentrating on the doubling of industrial production. As Stalin was at that point keeping open the option of a re-unified Germany, it was not until July 1952 that the party moved towards the construction of a socialist society in East Germany. The "building of socialism" (Aufbau des Sozialismus) had begun in earnest as soon as talks of reunification faltered. By 1952, 80% of industry had been nationalized.

The Council of Ministers of East Germany decided to close the Inner German Border in May 1952. The National People's Army (NVA) was established in March 1956, an expansion of the Kasernierte Volkspolizei which been set up already in June 1952. The Stasi (MfS) was founded in 1950, rapidly expanded and employed to intensify the regime's repression of the people. The states (Länder) were effectively abolished in July 1952 and the country was governed centrally through districts.

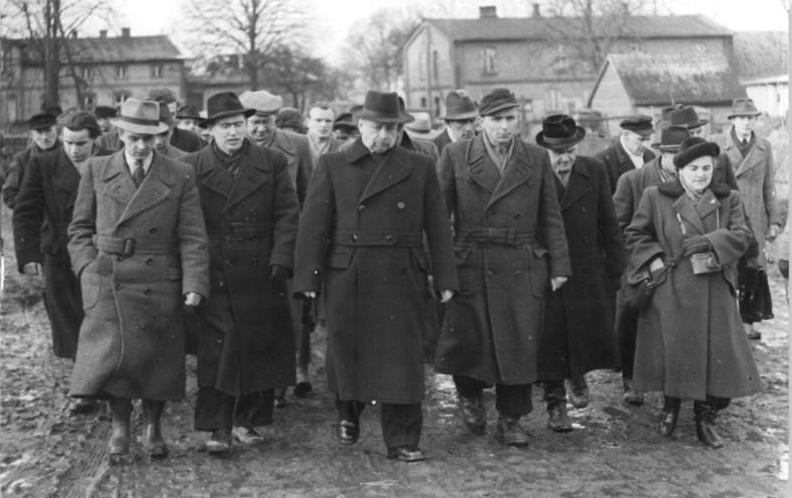
Ulbricht visiting a collective farm in Trinwillershagen in January 1953

Ulbricht uncritically followed the orthodox Stalinist model of industrialization: concentration on the development of heavy industry.

In 1957, Ulbricht arranged a visit to an East German collective farm at Trinwillershagen in order to demonstrate the GDR's modern agricultural industry to the visiting Soviet Politburo member Anastas Mikoyan. The collectivization of agriculture was completed in 1960, later than Ulbricht had expected. Following the death of President Wilhelm Pieck in 1960, the SED wrote the president's post out of the constitution. Taking its place was a collective head of state, the Council of State. Ulbricht was named its chairman, a post equivalent to that of president. His power consolidated, Ulbricht suppressed critics such as Karl Schirdewan, Ernst Wollweber, Fritz Selbmann, Fred Oelssner, Gerhart Ziller and others from 1957 onward, designated them as "factionalists" and eliminated them politically.

=== The Berlin Wall ===
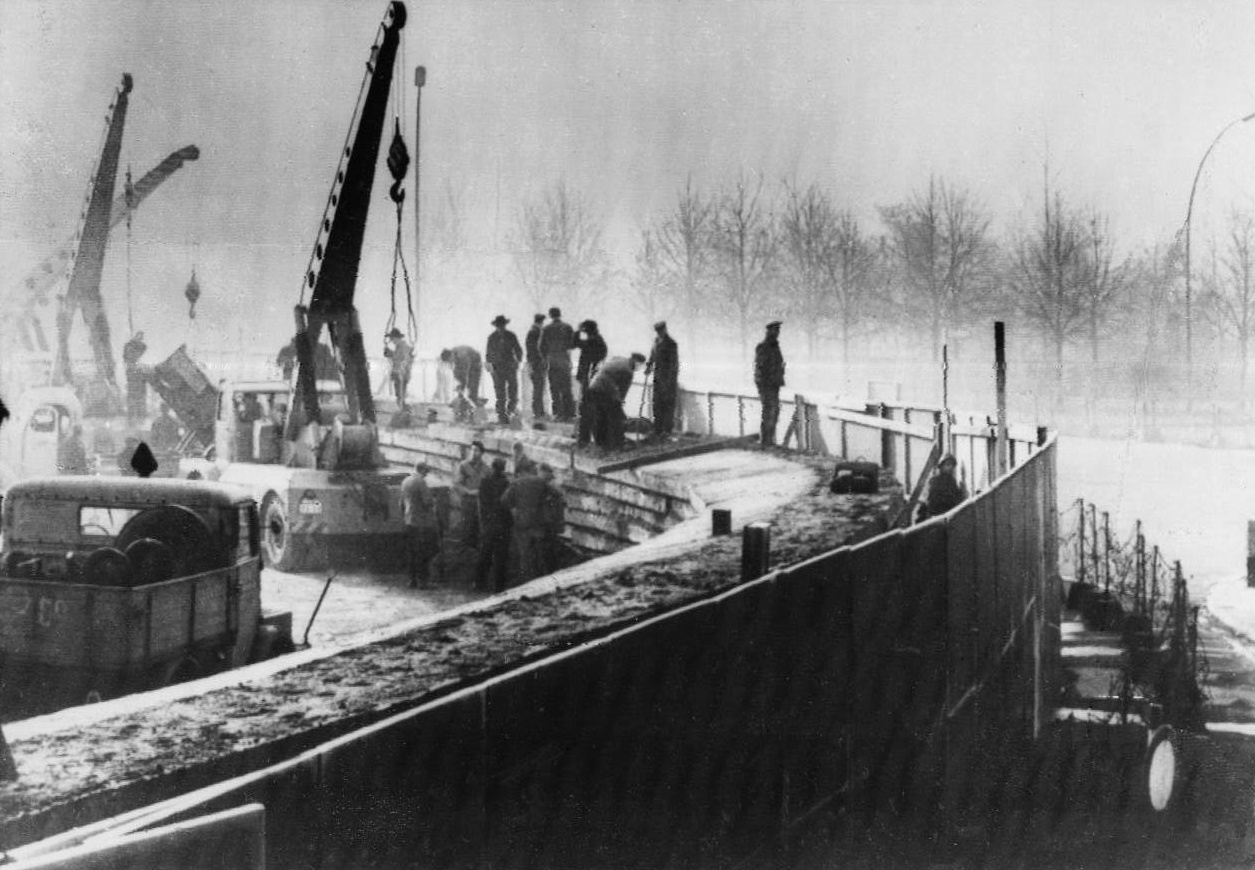
East German construction workers building the Berlin Wall in November 1961

Despite economic gains, emigration still continued. By 1961, 1.65 million people had fled to the west. Fearful of the possible consequences of this continued outflow of refugees, and aware of the dangers an East German collapse would present to the Eastern Bloc, Ulbricht pressured Soviet Premier Nikita Khrushchev in early 1961 to stop the outflow and resolve the status of Berlin. During this time, the refugees' mood was rarely expressed in words, though East German laborer Kurt Wismach did so effectively by shouting for free elections during one of Ulbricht's speeches.

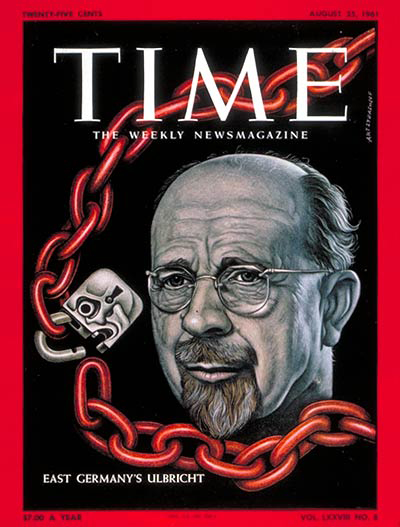
Walter Ulbricht's second appearance on the cover of Time magazine- 25 August 1961

When Khrushchev approved the building of a wall as a means to resolve this situation, Ulbricht threw himself into the project with abandon. Delegating different tasks in the process while maintaining overall supervision and careful control of the project, Ulbricht managed to keep secret the purchase of vast amounts of building materials, including barbed wire, concrete pillars, timber, and mesh wire. On 13 August 1961, work began on what was to become the Berlin Wall, only two months after Ulbricht had emphatically denied that there were such plans ("Nobody has the intention of building a wall"), thereby mentioning the word "wall" for the very first time. Ulbricht deployed GDR soldiers and police to seal the border with West Berlin overnight. The mobilization included 8,200 members of the People's Police, 3,700 members of the mobile police, 12,000 factory militia members, and 4,500 State Security officers. Ulbricht also dispersed 40,000 East German soldiers across the country to suppress any potential protests. Once the wall was in place, Berlin went from being the easiest place to cross the border between East and West Germany to being the most difficult.

The 1968 invasion by Warsaw Pact troops of Czechoslovakia and the suppression of the Prague Spring were also applauded by Ulbricht. East German soldiers were among those massed on the border but did not cross over, probably due to Czech sensitivities about German troops on their soil during World War II. It earned him a reputation as a staunch Soviet ally, in contrast to Romanian leader Nicolae Ceaușescu, who condemned the invasion.

=== The New Economic System ===
From 1963, Ulbricht and his economic adviser Wolfgang Berger attempted to create a more efficient economy through a New Economic System (Neues Ökonomisches System or NÖS). This meant that under the centrally coordinated economic plan, a greater degree of local decision-making would be possible. The reason was not only to stimulate greater responsibility on the part of companies, but also the realization that decisions were sometimes better taken locally. One of Ulbricht's principles was the "scientific" execution of politics and economy: making use of sociology and psychology but most of all the natural sciences. The effects of the NÖS, which corrected mistakes made in the past, were largely positive, with growing economic efficiency.

The New Economic System, which involved measures to end price hikes and increase access to consumer goods, was not very popular within the party, however, and from 1965 onwards opposition grew, mainly under the direction of Erich Honecker and with tacit support of Soviet leader Leonid Brezhnev. Ulbricht's preoccupation with science meant that more and more control of the economy was being relegated from the party to specialists. The ideological hardliners of the party also accused Ulbricht of having motivations that were at odds with the communist ideals.

=== Cultural and architectural policy ===
The communist regime demolished large numbers of important historical buildings. The Berlin Palace and the Potsdam City Palace were destroyed in 1950 and 1959. About 60 churches, including intact, rebuilt or ruined ones, were blown up, including 17 in East Berlin. The Ulrich Church in Magdeburg was razed in 1956, the Dresden Sophienkirche in 1963, the Potsdam Garrison Church in June 1968 and the fully intact Leipzig Paulinerkirche in May 1968. Citizens protesting the church demolitions were imprisoned.

Ulbricht attempted to shield the GDR from the cultural and social influences of the capitalist parts of the Western world, particularly its youth culture. He intended to create the most comprehensive youth culture of the GDR, which should be largely independent of capitalist influences.

In 1965 at the 11th Plenary Meeting of the Central Committee of the SED, he made a critical speech about copying culture from the Western world by referring to the "Yeah, Yeah, Yeah" of the Beatles song: "Is it truly the case that we have to copy every dirt that comes from the West? I think, comrades, with the monotony of the yeah, yeah, yeah and whatever it is all called, yes, we should put an end to it".

=== Dismissal and death ===
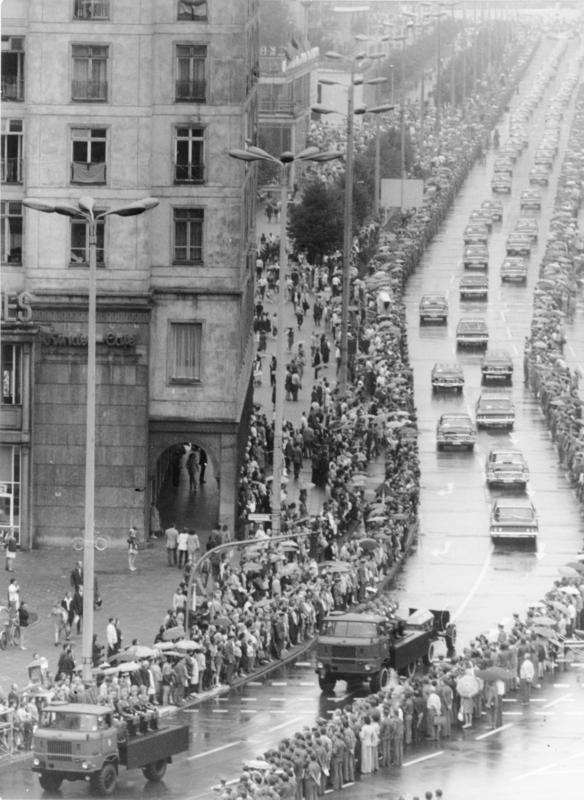
Ulbricht's state funeral in East Berlin on 7 August 1973

By the late 1960s, Ulbricht was increasingly isolated both at home and abroad. The construction of the Berlin Wall became a public relations disaster for him, not only in the West, but even with the Eastern Bloc. This became gradually critical as East Germany faced increasing economic problems due to his failed reforms, and other countries refused to offer any kind of assistance. His refusal to seek rapprochement with West Germany on Soviet terms, and his rejection of détente infuriated Soviet leader Brezhnev who, by that time, found Ulbricht's demands for greater independence from Moscow increasingly intolerable (especially in the aftermath of the Prague Spring). One of his few victories during this time was the replacement of the GDR's original people's democratic constitution with a completely Communist document in 1968. The document formally declared East Germany to be a socialist state under the leadership of the SED, thus codifying the de facto state of affairs since 1949.

During his later years, Ulbricht became increasingly stubborn and tried to assert dominance vis-a-vis other Eastern bloc countries, and even the Soviet Union. He declared at economic conferences that post-war times when East Germany had to offer other socialist countries free patents, were over once and for all and everything actually had to be paid for. Ulbricht began to believe that he had achieved something special, like Lenin and Stalin had. At the celebrations of the 50th anniversary of the October Revolution in Moscow, he untactfully boasted about having personally known Lenin and having been an active communist in the USSR already 45 years ago. In 1969 Ulbricht's Soviet guests at the State Council (Staatsrat) showed clear signs of dissatisfaction when he lectured them heavily on East Germany's supposed economic successes.

On 3 May 1971 Ulbricht was forced to resign from virtually all of his public functions "due to reasons of poor health" and was replaced, with the consent of the Soviets, by Erich Honecker. Ulbricht was allowed to remain as Chairman of the State Council, the effective head of state, and held on to this post for the rest of his life. Additionally, the honorary position of Chairman of the SED was created especially for him. Ulbricht died at a government guesthouse in Groß Dölln near Templin, north of East Berlin, on 1 August 1973, during the World Festival of Youth and Students, having suffered a stroke two weeks earlier. He was honoured with a state funeral, cremated and buried at the Memorial to the Socialists (German: Gedenkstätte der Sozialisten) in the Friedrichsfelde Central Cemetery, Berlin.

== Legacy ==
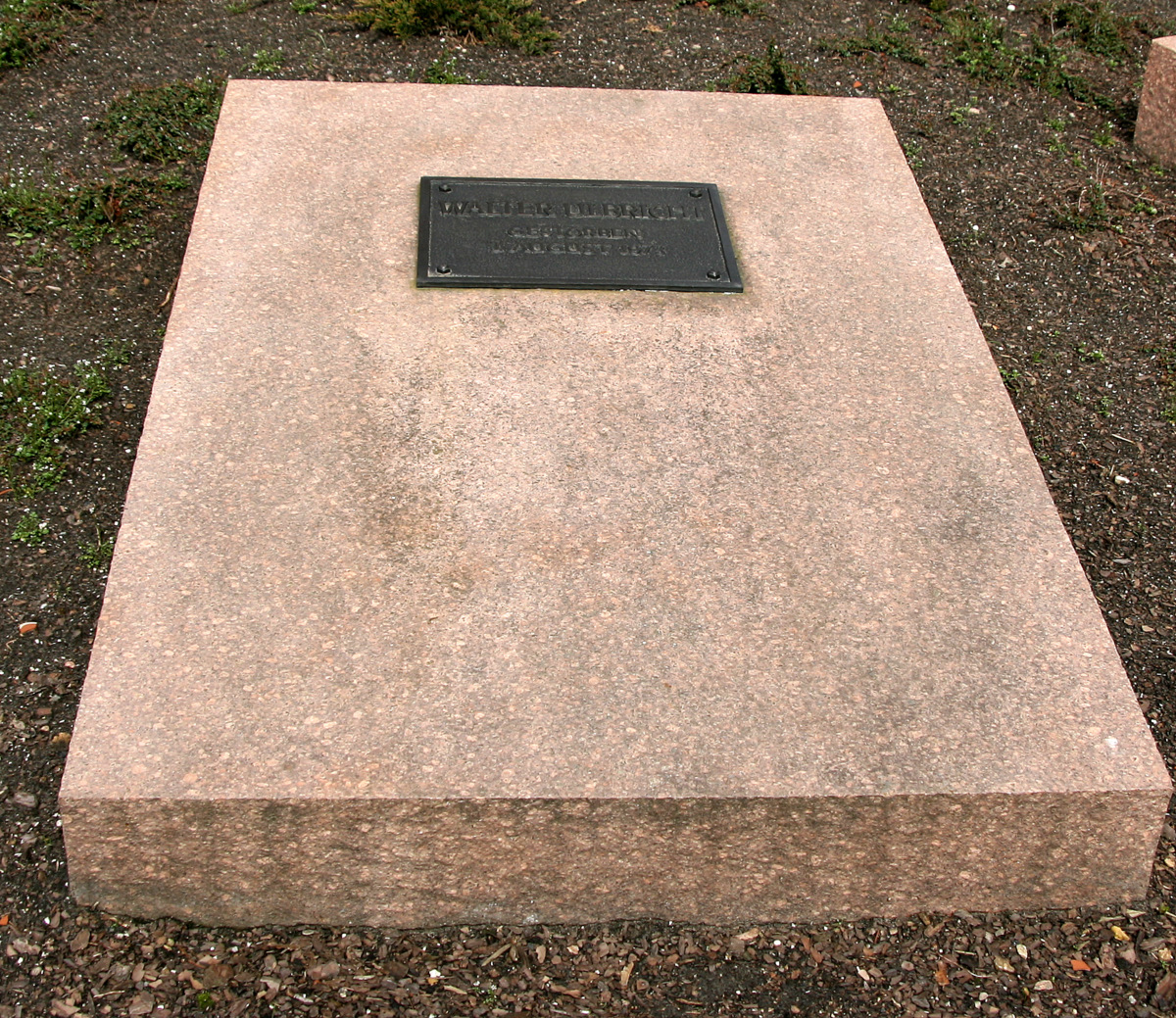
Ulbricht's grave in Berlin

Ulbricht remained loyal to Marxist-Leninist principles throughout his life, rarely able or willing to make doctrinal compromises. Inflexible and unlikeable, a "widely-loathed Stalinist bureaucrat well known for his tactics denouncing rivals", he never attracted much public admiration. Nevertheless, he combined strategic intransigence with tactical flexibility; and until his 1971 downfall, he was able to get himself out of more than one difficult situation that defeated many communist leaders with much greater charisma than himself.

Despite stabilising the GDR to some extent, and making improvements in the national economy which were unimaginable in many other Warsaw Pact states, he never succeeded in raising East Germany's standard of living to a level comparable to that in the West. Nikita Khrushchev observed, "A disparity quickly developed between the living conditions of Germans in East Germany and those in West Germany."

German historian Jürgen Kocka in 2010 summarized the consensus of scholars about the state that Ulbricht headed for its first two decades:

Conceptualizing the GDR as a dictatorship has become widely accepted, while the meaning of the concept dictatorship varies. Massive evidence has been collected that proves the repressive, undemocratic, illiberal, nonpluralistic character of the GDR regime and its ruling party.

== Cult of personality ==
With his below-average height of 165 centimetres (5 feet 5 inches), his high-pitched voice, which may have come into being as a result of a larynx disease he carried with him since 1925, his strong Saxon accent, his lack of rhetorical talent, his consistent use of the confirmatory term "ja?" at the end of sentences, Ulbricht was a very uncharismatic politician. After attempts to reinvent him as a charismatic leader in the 1950s failed due to lack of popular support, the East German leadership at least pretended that such charisma existed. The historian Rainer Gries states on that subject: "Ultimately, the Ulbricht propaganda no longer focused on the acquisition of charisma, but merely the pretension of charisma."

In the 1950s, several industrial plants, institutions and sport facilities were named after Ulbricht, for example the German Academy for State and Legal Sciences. The East German Postal Office replaced its stamp series of the deceased president Pieck with one bearing the portrait of Ulbricht. His images were hung in schools, residencies, and industrial facilities. In 1956, when Destalinisation started both in the Soviet Union as well as the Eastern Bloc countries, the newspaper Neues Deutschland published an article titled: "With Walter Ulbricht for the fortune of humanity."

Especially at Ulbricht's round birthdays in 1958, 1963 and 1968, the cult of personality around him was extended. The festivities around his 60th birthday in 1953 were however cut short because of the crisis developing into the 1953 East German uprising: An already finished propaganda movie about him was not published and a stamp with his image was not publicised either. On other dates, the official East German propaganda followed the standards set by the personality cults of Lenin and Stalin in the Soviet Union. On these occasions, Ulbricht's origin from a working-class family was emphasised, he was hailed as the "foundation of a new life" (by Johannes R. Becher) as well as a "worker genius" and "master of the times":

The German Democratic Republic views him as an idol in terms of diligence, energy and workforce – as the personification of unimaginable achievements. The construction of socialism greets you as its most important architect. And all of us, who love their homeland, who all love peace, love you, Walter Ulbricht, the German worker's son.

Ulbricht was accused of building a cult of personality around himself, with an elaborate jubilee planned for his 60th birthday on 30 June 1953, which Ulbricht later cancelled. The propaganda film Baumeister des Sozialismus – Walter Ulbricht, was not screened until the fall of the GDR. On the occasion of his 70th birthday on 30 June 1963, the East German regime organised grand festivities, to which Nikita Khrushchev was also invited in order to meet and honour the "creator of the socialist German miracle". On the occasion of those festivities and in several biographies published throughout the 1960s, Ulbricht was portrayed as a warrior against fascism, a good German and overall a good person. Special emphasis was put on his supposed closeness to the people, who supposedly trusted him in all aspects. From this, he formulated his motto: "From the people, with the people, for the people". Erich Honecker brought this identification of the dictator and the state together with the motto: "Ulbricht will win. And Ulbricht – that is all of us."

Ulbricht was awarded all civil medals of East Germany, in addition to several Soviet honours.

- Hero of Socialist Labour (1953, 1958, 1963)
- Order of Karl Marx (1953, 1968)
- Patriotic Order of Merit (1954)
- Banner of Labour (1960)
- Hero of the Soviet Union (1963)
- Order of Lenin (1963)

Publicly, the effect of such propaganda remained limited. Ulbricht's dialect, his falsetto voice and his crampness lent several enemies the opportunity to create caricatures of him. For instance, he was called a "grey, whistling mouse" by Gerhard Zwerenz. Using the term "Spitzbart", referring to Ulbricht's beard and using the adjective "all-knowing" for Ulbricht constituted defamation of the state in the eye of the judicial system of East Germany.

A tape containing a recitation of Goethe's Faust by a parodist imitating Ulbricht was in wide circulation in East Germany, eventually causing the Stasi secret police to intervene on the charge of defamation of the state.

== Personal life ==
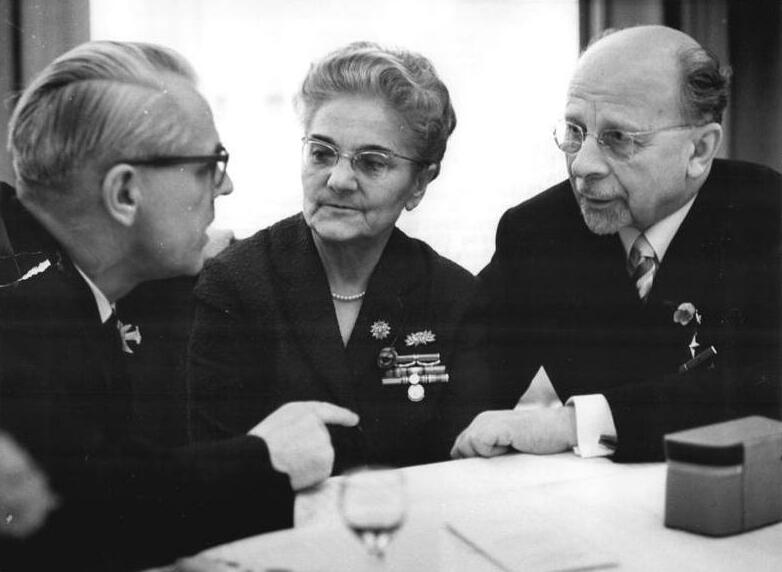
Ulbricht (right), wife Lotte, and Willi Stoph in 1967

Ulbricht lived in Majakowskiring, Pankow, East Berlin. He married twice: in 1920 to Martha Schmellinsky and from 1953 until his death to Lotte Ulbricht née Kühn (1903–2002). Ulbricht and Schmelinsky had a daughter in 1920, who grew up and lived separated from Ulbricht for almost her entire life. After the failure of this first marriage, he was in a relationship with Rosa Michel (born Marie Wacziarg, 1901–1990). With Michel, Ulbricht had another daughter, Rose (1931–1995).

His marriage with Lotte Kühn, his partner for most of his life (they had been together since 1935), remained childless. The couple adopted a daughter whom they named Beate. She was born in 1944 to a Ukrainian forced laborer in Leipzig. Although Beate Ulbricht remembered her father warmly, she referred to her mother in an extensive interview given to a tabloid in 1991 as "the hag", adding that she was "cold-hearted and egoistic". She also said that Walter Ulbricht was ordered to marry Lotte by Stalin.

== Decorations ==
In 1956, Ulbricht was awarded the Hans Beimler Medal, for veterans of the Spanish Civil War, which caused controversy among other recipients, who had actually served on the front line. He was awarded the title Hero of the Soviet Union on 29 June 1963. On visiting Egypt in 1965, Ulbricht was awarded the Great Collar of the Order of the Nile by Nasser. On 9 June 1965, he was awarded the Order of the Yugoslav Great Star.

== See also ==
- Ivan Konev
- Wilhelm Zaisser – tried to depose Ulbricht in 1953
- Rudolf Herrnstadt

== Notes ==
Party political offices
New creation	General Secretary of the Central Committee of the Socialist Unity Party of Germany; 25 July 1950–3 May 1971	Succeeded by Erich Honecker
Political offices
Preceded by Wilhelm Pieck; As President	Chairman of the Council of State of the German Democratic Republic; 12 September 1960–1 August 1973	Succeeded by Willi Stoph
