= New Economic System =

East German economic policy (1963–1968)

The New Economic System (German: Neues Ökonomisches System), officially the New Economic System of Planning and Management, was an economic policy that was implemented by the ruling Socialist Unity Party (SED) of the German Democratic Republic (GDR) in 1963. Its purpose was to replace the system of Five-Year Plans which had been used to run the GDR's economy from 1951 onwards. The System was introduced by Walter Ulbricht to try to improve the performance of the existing central planning, so that the economy might be run in as efficient a manner as possible.

Its main aims were to reduce the wastage of raw materials, increase the level of mechanization used in production methods and, most significantly, to create a system in which quality rather than quantity was foremost. It was also used to rebuild the economy following the Republikflucht which had devastated the GDR's economy prior to the building of the Berlin Wall on 13 August 1961.

The New Economic System (NES) was largely unsuccessful and was replaced in 1968 by the Economic System of Socialism (ESS) which concentrated on building up the GDR's high-tech industries.

== Background ==
The New Economic System was launched in the first half of 1963 in East Germany by its leader Walter Ulbricht. Its goal was to stabilize the ruling regime by demonstrating the GDR's competitiveness with the West German economic miracle. Ulbricht tried achieving higher economic growth by introducing very limited free market elements into the existing Stalinist state-plan model. Due to ideological reasons, the NES was never fully implemented, did not generate the expected results, and after 1967–68 was reorganized into the new Economic System of Socialism, which caused even more disruptions to the rigid socialist economy. It was ended by the SED's conservative wing in late 1970/early 1971 with the removal of Walter Ulbricht from power by Erich Honecker.

Following the end of World War II, the SED established a moderate economic policy, but according to historian Paul Sanderson there was an abrupt turning point in September 1948, when the SED went from a "mass political party" to a Marxist–Leninist party, which implemented "a drastic change in the socio-economic policy of the SED."

Ulbricht embarked on the reform course not because he had suddenly become a reformer, but because he was desperately looking for a way to stabilize his regime. The old Stalinist Walter Ulbricht was not a natural reformer, after all, he himself had created the five-year plan system. Neither the first two five-year plans, nor the forced collectivization of 1960 had delivered the expected results. The first five-year plan was changed in spring-summer 1953 when the New Course was introduced and altered after the suppression of the 17 June uprising in East Germany. Due to increasing problems, the second five-year plan was transformed into the seven-year plan (1958–1965), which was more or less abandoned in 1961 and from then on planning was influenced by the NES and ESS.

The growing problems in the economy (food and other shortages) were creating political problems, like the mass exodus to the West. These were partially solved by erecting the Berlin Wall.

== Reasons for introducing the NES ==
During 1962 Ulbricht created a few working groups whose task was to create proposals for the NES. Besides Ulbricht, the main architects of NES were Günter Mittag, Erich Apel, Herbert Wolf [de] and Wolfgang Berger.

There were a few reasons behind NES:

- Regime's prestige and stability. Ulbricht and SED had repeatedly announced growth goals that were never met. The growing dissonance between slogans and reality increased dissatisfaction among the population.
- West Germany was developing increasingly faster than East Germany during the Wirtschaftswunder.
- Stabilizing effect of the Berlin Wall. After it was erected, the massive emigration to the West ended and the regime was more secure to concentrate on internal reforms without fear of mass exodus.
- Economic failures endangered Ulbricht's dream of uniting Germany under SED leadership. He was certain that West Germany would agree to unification only if the GDR was able to demonstrate that its socialist system was economically superior.
- Khrushchev Thaw. After the 1950s destalinization in the USSR, Soviet bloc countries experimented with various unorthodox ways of rapidly improving their economies.

== Basic points of NES ==
Instead of pressuring everyone towards fulfilling their annual plan, Ulbricht wanted to develop a more long-term plan for increased growth in GDR and to allow state companies more freedom of action in achieving these goals. However, NES never really had a single plan or clear timeline. In place of five-year plans Ulbricht called for the creation of Perspektivplan, which was never created as the long-term planning of state controlled economy proved to be a near-impossible task.

At the 6th SED congress in January 1963, Ulbricht criticized the existing bureaucratic and centralized ways of managing the economy and announced the basic principles of NES:

- Factory managers will be given more autonomy within less rigid five-year plans.
- Prices will become more flexible and market based.
- Economic success will be measured also by profit and not only by fulfillment of the plan.
- Material incentives will be introduced to encourage higher worker productivity.
- Worker participation in management will be allowed via production committees.
- Private and partially state-owned companies will be given more freedom.
- In place of SED ideologues, technocrats and industry experts will be more involved in decision making.

Jeffrey Kopstein writes that “The primary goal of the reform was to overcome the yearly plan mentality that neglected long-range structural changes in technologies and production processes.”

The International Monetary Fund explains that within the NES, Ulbricht stressed "Economic Levers" (ökonomische Hebel), which shifted the focus from fundamental quantitative indicators to a more holistic "profitability and premiums wages" perspective.

== Implementation and problems ==
To succeed NES needed to overcome two problems: to ensure steady supplies of raw materials from USSR and to increase productive capacity of economy.

In 1963, faced with its own shortages, the USSR informed the GDR that it would receive less oil than promised because of the need to support revolutionary Cuba. Also, deliveries of steel, cotton, grain and meat were reduced by 25–35%.

Companies were allowed to decide and finance necessary investments from their own profits or to request money from the state. Since many companies did not generate any profit at all, this led to unrealistic increases in requests for financing from the state budget.

During 1966 and 1967 the number of state-determined production indicators was further reduced and ministries were given more freedom in creating their own plans. At the same time plans for closing down unprofitable companies and transferring workers to other companies (unemployment was unimaginable) met with resistance from workers and the plan was never implemented.

For political and prestige reasons the state was unwilling to close unprofitable factories and continued investing in loss-making industries. Also for political reasons Ulbricht was not ready to increase or liberalize the prices of consumer products.

The SED regime was sensitive to any signals of working-class unrest and wage increases in these years outpaced productivity increases. Left to their own devices, companies started increasing salaries and bonuses. Salaries began to rise faster than the volume of available goods, creating more shortages and dissatisfaction among people. While previously the economy was administered and managed by party ideologues, NES required more knowledge of economics and within the SED two wings developed: one was made up of the old party members and the other of better-educated technocrats for whom ideological reasons were not the absolute guiding principle when making decisions about the economy.

== Criticism and end of NES ==
As problems increased, the party and government leaders reacted by increasing state control over the economy. Instead of increasing the markets control in the economy they returned to a system of economic planning and sought to improve it through application of technology and less centralized decision making.

During 1965 criticism of the NES increased from all sides. The 11th plenum of the SED in December 1965 marked some gains for the party conservatives led by Erich Honecker. While the immediate result was renewed state control over arts and culture, it also made sure that economic reform would not turn into political reform by reinforcing the notion of state control over the economy. Critics of the NES pointed out that a command economy was the basis of a socialist system, and that emphasis on profits and the market were capitalist concepts. Ulbricht defended the NES as a continuation of the traditional Soviet model for economic planning.

Erich Apel, chairman of the State Planning Commission, cracked under the impossible task and on 3 December 1965 committed suicide.

Implementation of the NES was also negatively influenced by the overthrow of Khrushchev. After suggesting that Ulbricht should follow Evsei Liberman's ideas, the USSR did not provide more guidance and after Khrushchev's downfall the reform course was uncertain, although some years later the USSR implemented similar reforms under Kosygin. This meant that Ulbricht had no clear Soviet political backing, which left him vulnerable to internal criticism not only from conservatives but also from those responsible for the economy.

In order to pacify the critics and to show that the NES was compatible with socialism, during the 7th Party congress in April 1967, Ulbricht renamed his economic reforms as "Economic System of Socialism" (ESS).

From 1968, greater state control over the economy was reintroduced to achieve accelerated growth in selected segments of industry.

== Goal of German unification ==
Besides stabilizing the East German regime by improving the living situation of its citizens, Ulbricht was still dreaming about uniting both Germanies under SED leadership. He wanted NES and EES to succeed, to overtake West Germany economically and then to achieve unification. To achieve this dream the GDR had to first demonstrate the superiority of its economic system.

Other leaders, especially Erich Honecker, thought that the GDR could not win economically and that comparisons with the capitalist West had to stop. They advocated closer cooperation with the USSR, strengthening of socialism and class struggle against capitalism. They argued that the goal of socialism was not to be richer than capitalists, but to create a different system. In their opinion the GDR had to concentrate on its own unique socialist identity. Starting from 1971 this was achieved and implemented under Honecker, especially with the 1974 amendments of the constitution of the Democratic Republic of Germany. At the same time as the Basic Treaty opened the GDR to much greater cultural influence from the FRG, the GDR regime needed all the more Abgrenzung (delimitation) between the cultures to both justify and protect its existence, a factor that only drove up the already extreme degree of Stasi domestic surveillance.

== See also ==
- New Economic Policy (NEP), an economic reform in the Soviet Union in 1921–28
- New Course, an economic reform applied by the Soviet Union to the Eastern Bloc in 1953–56
- New Economic Mechanism (NEM), an economic reform launched in Hungary in 1968
- Economic System of Socialism (ESS), an economic policy in East Germany in 1968–70
