= No net cost =

No net cost is a requirement that certain commodity programs operate at no net cost to the federal government. The No Net Cost Tobacco Act of 1982 (P.L. 97-218) required an assessment on 1982 and subsequent tobacco crops to cover potential tobacco price support program losses. The 1985 farm bill (P.L. 99-198) required that USDA operate the sugar program for the first time at no cost; a provision repealed by the 1996 farm bill (P.L. 104-127) and reinstated by the 2002 farm bill (P.L. 107-171, Sec. 1401(a)). The 1996 changes to the peanut price support program were designed to ensure that it also operated at no cost. Subsequently, the peanut program was completely changed by the 2002 farm bill, but not in a manner to make it no-net-cost.
