= Smoker protection law =

Law prohibiting employers from discriminating against tobacco users

Smoker protection laws in the United States State with smoker protection law State with non-specific laws protecting smokers

In the United States, smoker protection laws are state statutes that prevent employers from discriminating against employees for using tobacco products. Currently twenty-nine states and the District of Columbia have such laws. Although laws vary from state to state, employers are generally prohibited from either refusing to hire or firing an employee for using any type of tobacco product during non-working hours and off of the employer's property. In four states (California, Colorado, New York, and North Carolina), there is no specific law related to employee tobacco use but smokers are protected under broader state statutes that prohibit employers from discriminating against any employee who engages in a lawful activity. California also has a law that protects employees who engage in lawful activity, but it has been interpreted by the courts as not creating any new substantive rights but instead set forth a process to pursue claims for violation of existing Labor Code protections before the state Division of Labor Standards Enforcement.

Most of these laws were first enacted in the late 1980s and early 1990s. However, as discrimination against smokers in the workplace has become more widespread in recent years, several states have enacted such laws more recently. In states without smoker protection laws some employers have begun refusing to hire new employees who smoke. While many of these employers are using the honor system to enforce these policies, a few of them are requiring that employees be tested for nicotine. Many of the businesses with these policies are in the healthcare industry, but some county and municipal governments have also enacted such policies.

Arizona previously had a smoker protection law but it was repealed 2007.

== States with smoker protection laws ==
| State | Year | Code | Notes |
|---|---|---|---|
| California | 2005 | CA LABOR CODE § 96(k) & 98.6 | Not specific to tobacco use, covers all lawful activities but has been interpreted by the courts as not creating any new substantive rights |
| Colorado | 1990 | CO REV. STAT. ANN § 24-34-402.5 | Not specific to tobacco use, covers all lawful activities |
| Connecticut | 2003 | CT GEN. STAT. ANN. § 31-40s | |
| District of Columbia | 1993 | D.C. CODE ANN. § 7-1703.3 | |
| Illinois | 1987 | 820 ILL. COMP. STAT. 55/5 | |
| Indiana | 2006 | IND. CODE §§ 22-5-4-1 et seq. | |
| Kentucky | 1994 | KY REV. STAT. ANN. § 344.040 | |
| Louisiana | 1991 | LA REV. STAT. ANN. § 23:966 | |
| Maine | 1991 | ME REV. STAT. ANN. tit. 26, § 597 | |
| Minnesota | 1992 | MINN. STAT. § 181.938 | |
| Mississippi | 1994 | MISS. CODE ANN. § 71-7-33 | |
| Missouri | 1992 | MO. REV. STAT. § 290.145 | |
| Montana | 1993 | MONT. CODE ANN. §§ 39-2-313 & 39-2-314 | |
| Nevada | 1991 | NEV. REV. STAT. § 613.333 | |
| New Hampshire | 1991 | N.H. REV. STAT. ANN. § 275:37-a | |
| New Jersey | 1991 | N.J. STAT. ANN. §§ 34:6B-1 et seq. | |
| New Mexico | 1991 | N.M. STAT. ANN. §§ 50-11-1 et seq. | |
| New York | 1992 | [LABOR] LAW § 201-d | Not specific to tobacco use, covers all lawful activities |
| North Carolina | 1991 | N.C. GEN. STAT. § 95-28.2 | Not specific to tobacco use, covers all lawful activities |
| North Dakota | 1993 | N.D. CENT. CODE §§ 14-02.4-01 et seq. | |
| Oklahoma | 1991 | OKLA. STAT. ANN. tit. 40, § 500 | |
| Oregon | 1989 | OR. REV. STAT. §§ 659A.315 & 659A.885 | |
| Rhode Island | 2005 | R.I. GEN. LAWS § 23-20.10-14 | |
| South Carolina | 1991 | S.C. CODE ANN. § 41-1-85 | |
| South Dakota | 1991 | S.D. CODIFIED LAWS § 60-4-11 | |
| Tennessee | 1990 | TENN. CODE ANN. § 50-1-304 | |
| Virginia | 1989 | VA. CODE ANN. § 2.2-2902 | |
| West Virginia | 1992 | W. VA. CODE § 21-3-19 | |
| Wisconsin | 1991 | WIS. STAT. §§ 111.31 et seq | |
| Wyoming | 1992 | WYO. STAT. ANN. §§ 27-9-101 et seq. | |
