= New Course =

The New Course (German: Neuer Kurs) was an economic policy that aimed to improve the standard of living, increase the availability of consumer goods and lower the price of foodstuffs by returning small businesses and farms to the private sector in East Germany (the GDR).

== History ==
The New Course was initiated in the Soviet Union, but would be applied to the satellite countries under its influence, including the GDR. The Council of Ministers believe the previous mistakes made should be corrected. The Minister President described the need to rehabilitate many social programs; including the distribution of ration cards, methods of tax collection amongst others. The plan was instituted in June 1956.

== Policy description ==
There were three major thrusts of the new course: improvement of consumer goods, the end of terror, and a relaxation of ideological standards. It was announced in March 1953, after the death of Soviet premier Joseph Stalin. Investment in heavy industry was to be cut and production of consumer goods stepped up. A series of taxes on farmers, craftsmen, shopkeepers, and private firms was lifted. Private businesses that had been closed down by the authorities could start up again. Refugees who had gone to the West were invited to return and offered help. Farmers were promised back their land. They could borrow money, machines, and seeds. Intellectuals received permission to attend conferences in West Germany, and West Germans could get permission more easily to visit relatives in the GDR. Students expelled from a university because of their religious beliefs could come back. All those arrested on religious grounds were to be released, and the campaign against the church was to end. The idea of "class justice" was abandoned. The middle class would get ration cards back and some recent price increases were revoked. The SED Politburo admitted to "errors in the past."

=== Unaddressed issues ===
Although the "New Course" led to certain material improvements, it did not address the productivity quotas that had been raised in May. (It was this increase that originally sparked the agitation that led to the uprisings of June 17, 1953). On July 2 President Wilhelm Pieck explained the new policy, inaugurated on June 9, as one designed to raise the standard of living and bring about a rapprochement of the two parts of Germany. He estimated its cost at two billion marks, to be covered by cutting the heavy industries and defense programs.

The New Course was also applied to other Eastern bloc countries after the death of Stalin in 1953.

== See also ==
- New Economic System
- Economic System of Socialism
- Eastern Bloc economies
