= Debunkify =

Ohio anti-tobacco youth campaign

Debunkify is a campaign established in July 2006 aimed at dispelling tobacco and secondhand smoke misconceptions in the state of Ohio. A mobile marketing tour, complete with a Debunkify-branded vehicle and a team of brand ambassadors, canvassed Ohio on a 10-month run, with the aim of debunking tobacco myths and correcting tobacco misconceptions at each of its stops.

Throughout June 2007, 17 participating standTunz artists battled it out online for a chance to play at the Myth Farewell Tour Main Event.
