= WhiteLies.tv =

Anti-tobacco campaign in Indiana, United States

- Founded: 2001
- Purpose: Adult Tobacco Prevention
- Location: Indiana
- Website: www.whitelies.tv

Whitelies.tv was part of an anti-tobacco education campaign for the state of Indiana.

Whitelies.tv was launched in 2001, by the Indiana Tobacco Prevention and Cessation (ITPC). Its purpose was to decrease the high rate of tobacco use in Indiana. It was funded with money from the Master Settlement Agreement.

The Whitelies.tv brand is no longer being used.

== History of WhiteLies.tv ==
The WhiteLies.tv brand was the first brand created by the ITPC for media outreach. In March 2002, advertising for the brand focused on educating consumers on the tobacco industry's marketing tactics and the health problems caused by tobacco use in Indiana.

The Whitelies.tv media campaign was present throughout Indiana. It included television, radio, outdoor billboards, and newspaper ads and public relations. Over 65 community partners across Indiana were trained to extend and maximize the state's campaign budget.

== Quit 2 Win Contest ==
Quit 2 Win was a statewide promotional contest that was part of WhiteLies.tv. It was designed to encourage people to stop smoking . In 2008, Zachary Joley of Fort Wayne was awarded the grand prize of $2,500 for quitting tobacco use. In 2009 the contest awarded another $2,500 winner to a 20-year-old mother who had been smoking since she was 9.

== Indiana Quitline ==
1-800-Quit-Now is a free phone-based counseling service affiliated with WhiteLies.tv. Its services include:

- One on one coaching for Tobacco Users
- Resources for Healthcare Providers
- Best Practices for Employers who want to implement smoke-free policies
- Support for Family and Friends of smokers
- Tools for Tobacco Control partners to complement their current programs
