= Tobacco quota =

In the United States, Tobacco quotas (poundage quotas, and in some cases acreage allotments) were a supply control feature of federal price support for tobacco. Burley tobacco was subject to marketing quotas and flue-cured tobacco was subject to marketing quotas and acreage allotments. Tobacco quota owners (owners of farmland to which quota is assigned) voted every three years on whether or not to continue with price support (through no-net-cost loans) and marketing quotas. Producers of several minor tobaccos (including Maryland (type 32), Pennsylvania cigar-filler (type 41), and Connecticut Valley cigar-binder (types 51-52)) had disapproved federal support. The national marketing quota (basic quota) was calculated according to a formula specified by law that included consideration of intended purchases by domestic manufacturers, average exports over the preceding three years, and reserve stock requirements. The effective quota was the basic quota plus and minus temporary adjustments for allowable previous year under and over marketings. The Fair and Equitable Tobacco Reform Act of 2004 (P.L. 108-357, Title VI) ended tobacco quotas for 2005 crop and subsequent years.
