= No Net Cost Tobacco Act of 1982 =

- Long title: An Act to provide for the operation of the tobacco price support and production adjustment program in such a manner as to result in no net cost to taxpayers, to limit increases in the support price for tobacco, and for other purposes.
- Acronyms (colloquial): NNCTPA
- Nicknames: No Net Cost Tobacco Program Act of 1982
- Enacted by: the 97th United States Congress
- Effective: July 20, 1982

Citations
- Public law: 97-218
- Statutes at Large: 96 Stat. 197

Codification
- Titles amended: 7 U.S.C.: Agriculture
- U.S.C. sections amended: 7 U.S.C. ch. 35 § 1281; 7 U.S.C. ch. 35, subch. II §§ 1301, 1314, 1314-1, 1314b, 1314b-1, 1314b-2, 1314c, 1314e, 1314f, 1316, 1373; 7 U.S.C. ch. 35A, subch. II §§ 1445, 1445-1, 1445-2

Legislative history
- Introduced in the House as H.R. 6590 by Charlie Rose (D-NC) on June 15, 1982; Committee consideration by House Agriculture, Senate Agriculture, Nutrition, and Forestry; Passed the House on June 21, 1982 (Passed Voice Vote); Passed the Senate on July 14, 1982 (77-17) with amendment; House agreed to Senate amendment on July 15, 1982 (Agreed Unanimous Consent); Signed into law by President Ronald Reagan on July 20, 1982

The No Net Cost Tobacco Act of 1982 (P.L. 97-218) required that the Tobacco Price Support Program operate at no net cost to taxpayers, other than for the administrative expenses common to all price support programs. To satisfy this mandate, sellers and buyers (including importers) of tobacco were assessed equally to build a capital account that was drawn upon to reimburse the Commodity Credit Corporation (CCC) for any losses of principal and interest resulting from nonrecourse loan operations. Other provisions of this law provided for reducing the level of support for tobacco and made various modifications to the marketing quota and acreage allotment programs. No net cost assessments ended when price support was terminated after the 2004 crop.
