= Farmer suicides =

"Farmer suicides" may refer to:

- Farmers' suicides in Canada
- Farmers' suicides in India

- Farmers' suicides in western Odisha

- Farmers' suicides in the United States
