= Lagaan =

2001 Indian film by Ashutosh Gowariker

- English-language release poster
- Directed by: Ashutosh Gowariker
- Screenplay by: Ashutosh Gowariker; Kumar Dave; Sanjay Damya
- Story by: Ashutosh Gowariker
- Dialogues by: K. P. Saxena (Hindi); Ashutosh Gowariker (English)
- Produced by: Aamir Khan
- Starring: Aamir Khan; Gracy Singh; Rachel Shelley; Paul Blackthorne
- Narrated by: Amitabh Bachchan
- Cinematography: Anil Mehta
- Edited by: Ballu Saluja
- Music by: A. R. Rahman
- Production company: Aamir Khan Productions
- Distributed by: Sony Pictures Classics; SET Pictures
- Release date: 15 June 2001
- Running time: 233 minutes
- Country: India
- Language: Hindi
- Budget: ₹250 million
- Box office: est. ₹659.7 million (see below)

Lagaan: Once Upon a Time in India, or simply Lagaan, (transl. Land Tax) is a 2001 Indian Hindi-language sports drama film written and directed by Ashutosh Gowariker. The film was produced by Aamir Khan, who stars alongside debutant Gracy Singh and British actors Rachel Shelley and Paul Blackthorne. Set in 1893, during the late Victorian period of British colonial rule in India, the film follows the inhabitants of a village in Central India, who, burdened by high taxes and several years of drought, are challenged by an arrogant British Indian Army officer to a game of cricket as a wager to avoid paying the taxes they owe. The villagers face the arduous task of learning a game that is alien to them and playing for victory.

Produced on a budget of ₹25 crore (US$5.3 million), Lagaan was the most expensive Indian film at the time of its release. It faced multiple challenges during production: Khan was initially sceptical about starring in a sports film, and later, prospective producers called for budget cuts and script modifications. Eventually, the film would become the maiden project of Aamir Khan Productions, and mark Khan's foray into film production. Gowariker was inspired by aspects of the sports drama Naya Daur (1957) in developing the film. The language featured in the film was based on Awadhi, but was diluted with standard Hindi for modern audiences. Principal photography took place in villages near Bhuj. Nitin Chandrakant Desai served as art director, while Bhanu Athaiya was the costume designer. The original soundtrack was composed by A. R. Rahman, with lyrics written by Javed Akhtar.

Lagaan was theatrically released in India on 15 June 2001, clashing with Gadar: Ek Prem Katha. It received widespread critical acclaim for Gowariker's direction, Khan's performance, dialogues, soundtrack, and the film's anti-imperialist stance. With earnings of ₹65.97 crore (US$13.98 million) during its initial release, the film was the third highest-grossing Hindi film of 2001. Lagaan was screened at numerous international film festivals and garnered multiple accolades. It was the third, and as of 2025 the last, Indian film to be nominated for the Academy Award for Best Foreign Language Film after Mother India (1957) and Salaam Bombay! (1988). Lagaan became the most-awarded film at the 47th Filmfare Awards with eight wins, including Best Film, Best Director for Gowariker and Best Actor for Khan. At the 49th National Film Awards, the film won eight awards, including Best Popular Film.

The film is considered to be one of the greatest films ever made in Indian cinema of the 2000s.

== Plot ==
In 1893, the farmers of the village of Champaner, located within the British Central India Agency, endure an oppressive colonial administration. Despite a devastating drought and a failed harvest, British officials demand the regular lagaan (land tax). Led by a resilient young farmer named Bhuvan, the villagers appeal to their local ruler, Raja Puran Singh, for a tax waiver. Their petition is intercepted by the arrogant and sadistic regiment commander, Captain Andrew Russell. Russell proposes a high-stakes wager: the villagers will play a game of cricket against his elite British officers. If the villagers win, their lagaan will be completely canceled for three consecutive years; if they lose, they must pay triple the standard tax, an ultimatum that would guarantee their starvation. Bhuvan boldly accepts the challenge, and the match is scheduled three months later.

Bhuvan initially faces intense skepticism and isolation, as the terrified villagers refuse to believe they can master an unfamiliar British sport. Slowly, he recruits a diverse group of eleven players, including a low-caste untouchable named Kachra, whose spin-bowling abilities prove lethal. Meanwhile, Russell’s sister, Elizabeth, arrives from England. Horrified by her brother's cruelty and secretly infatuated with Bhuvan, she decides to covertly coach the village team on the rules and strategies of the game. However, a jealous villager named Lakha, who covets Gauri—the village medic's daughter currently courted by Bhuvan—agrees to act as an insider informant and saboteur for Captain Russell. As the match approaches, Russell is severely reprimanded by his superiors for wagering the government treasury, and is warned that he will be court-martialed and forced to pay the taxes himself if the British lose.

The three-day match commences outside the British cantonment. On the first day, the British team bats first and builds a formidable score, heavily aided by the villagers' technical inexperience and Lakha’s deliberate sabotage on the field. That night, Elizabeth witnesses Lakha conferring with Russell and exposes the betrayal to the villagers. When the angry locals attack Lakha, Bhuvan intervenes, offering him a chance at redemption. Conscience-stricken, Lakha plays exceptionally well on the second day, executing critical catches that trigger a sudden British collapse, capping their innings at a daunting 322 runs. Champaner's batting response starts disastrously, losing their top batsmen rapidly to aggressive British bowling.

On the third and final day, Bhuvan anchors the collapsing innings, staging a heroic resistance alongside injured teammates. The tension peaks in the final over of the game, with the villagers requiring five runs off the final delivery to achieve victory. Russell delivers the ball, and Bhuvan strikes it high into the sky. Russell catches the ball and celebrates prematurely, but the umpire signals a no-ball as Russell had crossed the boundary line while catching it, granting Champaner a six. The villagers win the match against all odds, just as dark storm clouds burst to end the long drought. Amidst the euphoric celebrations, Elizabeth watches Bhuvan and Gauri embrace, realizing her love will remain unrequited.

In the aftermath, Elizabeth bids a poignant farewell to the grateful villagers and returns to England, where she spends the rest of her life unmarried, carrying her memories of Bhuvan. The narrator reveals that the humiliated British administration immediately transfers Russell to Central Africa and disbands the entire provincial regiment to cover up the embarrassment. Bhuvan and Gauri are married in a grand celebration blessed by Raja Puran Singh. Although Champaner's historic triumph effectively saved the entire province from ruin, the miraculous event ultimately slipped entirely through the cracks of documented history.

== Cast ==
Actor / Actress	Character / Role	Notes
Aamir Khan	Bhuvan	Captain and all-rounder Primary protagonist and love interest of Gauri and Elizabeth
Gracy Singh	Gauri	Bhuvan's love interest
Rachel Shelley	Elizabeth Russell	Coach of Team Champaner Sister of Capt. Russell
Paul Blackthorne	Captain Andrew Russell	Primary antagonist
Suhasini Mulay	Yashoda Mai	Bhuvan's mother
Kulbhushan Kharbanda	Rajah Puran Singh	King of Champaner and its surrounding villages
Rajendra Gupta	Mukhiya Ji	Village chieftain
Raghubir Yadav	Bhura	Slip fielder and poultry farmer
Rajesh Vivek	Guran	All-rounder
Shrivallabh Vyas	Ishwar	Wicket-keeper Gauri's father and the vaidya (village medic) Credited as Sri Vallabh Vyas
Raj Zutshi	Ismail	Batsman
Pradeep Rawat	Deva Singh Sodhi	All-rounder
Akhilendra Mishra	Arjan	Batsman and village blacksmith
Daya Shankar Pandey	Goli	Seamer
Yashpal Sharma	Lakha	Batsman, woodcutter
Amin Hajee	Bagha	Batsman, the mute drummer
Aditya Lakhia	Kachra	Spinner
Javed Khan	Ram Singh	Match commentator An Indian who works with the British Elizabeth's translator
A. K. Hangal	Shambu Kaka	Village elder
Amin Gazi	Tipu	Youngest team member
John Rowe	Colonel Boyer	
David Gant	Major Warren	
Jeremy Child	Major Cotton	
Chris England	Lt. Yardley	English fast bowler Also wrote a book about his experience making the film, titled Balham to Bollywood.
Howard Lee	Lt. Burton	English wicketkeeper batsman
Ben Nealon	Lt. Patrick Smith	English all-rounder Capt. Russell's deputy
Simon Holmes	Lt. Brookes	English batsman
Ray Eves	Lt. Willis	English fast bowler
Jon House	Lt. North	English batsman
Neil Patrick	Lt. Harrisson	English all-rounder
Jamie Whitby Coles	Lt. Wesson	English all-rounder
Barry Hart	Lt. Benson	English spinner
Alex Shirtcliff	Lt. Flynn	English batsman
Amitabh Bachchan	Voice-over as Narrator	

== Production ==
=== Development ===
Lagaan was inspired by Naya Daur (1957), a sports drama film directed by B. R. Chopra, written by Akhtar Mirza and Kamil Rashid, and starring Dilip Kumar, Vyjayanthimala and Ajit Khan.

Director Gowariker has stated that it was almost impossible to make Lagaan. He went to Khan, who agreed to participate after hearing the detailed script. Khan had initially rejected the idea of a "sporty" film, but was "himself in tears" upon hearing the full dialogued script. Even after securing Khan, Gowariker had trouble finding a producer. Producers who showed interest in the script wanted budget cuts as well as script modifications. Eventually, Khan agreed to Gowariker's suggestion that he would produce the film. Khan corroborated this by saying that the faith he had in Gowariker, the story and script of the film, and the opportunity of starting his own production company inspired him to produce Lagaan. He also said that by being a producer himself, he was able to give greater creative freedom to Gowariker. He cited an example:

"If the director tells the producer that he wants 50 camels, the latter will probably say, 'Why not 25? Can't you manage with 25 camels?' Whereas, if he is telling me the same thing... I will not waste time asking him questions because I am also creatively aware why he needs them."

Jhamu Sughand co-produced the film because he liked the emotional and patriotic story. Lagaan was made on a then-unprecedented budget of ₹250 million (US$5.32 million), the highest for an Indian film of the time.

=== Casting ===
Gowariker first thought of Shah Rukh Khan, Bobby Deol, Hrithik Roshan and Abhishek Bachchan for the role of Bhuvan. After Bachchan chose to enter cinema with J. P. Dutta's Refugee (2000), Khan was approached with the idea.

Several actresses had express interest to act in the female lead role in the film, but Khan needed someone who matched the description of the character given in the script. After considering Rani Mukerji who did not have dates to accommodate the film, Sonali Bendre, Nandita Das, Shamita Shetty and Ameesha Patel were approached for the role, Gowariker selected Singh for the female lead because he was convinced that she was a good actress and dancer and resembled actress Vyjayanthimala. Singh, a newcomer, devoted all her time to the film. Since the script also demanded a British cast, Gowariker and Khan hired Danielle Roffe as one of the casting directors. After Danielle and Gowariker screen-tested many, Shelley and Blackthorne were chosen for the prime roles. Overall, the film cast 15 foreign actors.

Raghubir Yadav played the role of the legendary Haji Nasruddin in the teleplay Mullah Nasiruddin and has given many memorable performances such as Mungerilal Ke Haseen Sapne. Yadav was selected for the role of Bhura, a poultry farmer, based on his performance in Earth (1998). He had undergone an appendectomy during the filming schedule and returned to complete some of his scenes. Rajesh Vivek, who played the fortune teller Guran, was spotted by Gowariker in the film Junoon (1978). His liking for cricket helped him in his role. Raj Zutshi's friendship with Khan and association in several films brought him the role of Ismail the potter after auditions. Pradeep Rawat's association with Khan in Sarfarosh (1999) brought him the role of Deva, a Sikh ex-sepoy, which was initially intended for Mukesh Rishi. Rawat claimed that it was the highest ever compensation he received in his career. Daya Shankar Pandey, who preferred the role of Kachra, was known to Khan and Gowariker through previous films (Pehla Nasha (1993), Baazi (1995) and Ghulam (1998)). Pandey credited Gowariker for his acting in the film as Goli, saying that Gowariker and he would discuss the required emotions and expressions before shooting.

Yashpal Sharma was chosen by Gowariker for the role of Lakha, the woodcutter, after his portrayal in Samar (1999). He said it was a good experience working with Khan and Gowariker during the film. Amin Hajee earlier worked in a film with Gowariker. The friendly association brought Gowariker to him with the script, which he liked, and thereafter he successfully auditioned for his role of Bagha, a mute drummer. His knowledge of mute people and some assistance from a music band helped him better prepare for his role. Gowariker, who believed that Amin was like Sylvester Stallone, would refer to him as Stallone during filming. Aditya Lakhia's association with Gowariker in Kabhi Haan Kabhi Naa (1993) and Pehla Nasha (1993) brought him the role of Kachra, the untouchable. He read the book Everybody Loves a Good Drought by P. Sainath to better understand and portray his character.

=== Pre-production ===
One of the first members to join the production team was Nitin Chandrakant Desai, the art director, with whom Gowariker set out for extensive location hunt throughout India, to find the setting for the fictional town of Champaner, in late 1998. After searching through Rajasthan, Nasik, UP, they zeroed in on an ancient village near Bhuj, located in Gujarat's Kutch district, by May 1999, where the film was primarily shot.

The script demanded a dry location: an agricultural village where it had not rained in several years. To depict the 1890s era, the crew also required a village which lacked electricity, communication and automobiles. Kutch faced the same problems at that time and hence the village of Kunariya, located a few miles away from Bhuj, was chosen. During the filming of Lagaan, it did not rain at all in the region. However, a week after the shoot finished, it rained heavily bringing relief to Bhuj, which had a lean monsoon the previous year. The typical old Kutch hamlet was built by the local people four months before the arrival of the crew. The 2001 Gujarat earthquake devastated this region and displaced many locals. The crew, including the English, contributed to their cause by donating ₹250,000 (equivalent to ₹1.1 million or US$11,000 in 2026), with further contributions during the year.

Avadhi, which is a dialect of Hindi, is primarily from a region in Uttar Pradesh. It was chosen to give the feel of the language spoken during that era. However, the language was diluted, and modern viewers can understand it. The dialogues, which were a combination of three dialects (Avadhi, Bhojpuri and Braj Bhasha) were penned by Hindi writer K. P. Saxena.

Bhanu Athaiya, who won an Oscar for her work in Gandhi (1982), was the costume designer for the film. With a large number of extras, it was difficult for her to make enough costumes. She spent a lot of time researching to lend authenticity to the characters.

=== Filming ===
The film took approximately a year to plan, which included ten months for production and one month for the development of Khan's character, which the first-time producer found tiring. Khan obtained a crew of about 300 people for six months. Due to the lack of comfortable hotels in Bhuj, he hired a newly constructed apartment and furnished it completely for the crew. Security was set up and a special housekeeping team was brought to take care of the crew's needs. Most of the 19th century tools and equipment depicted in the film were lent to the crew by the local villagers. Initially, they did not want to part with their equipment, but after much coaxing, they gave in. They then travelled to different parts of the country to collect the musical instruments used in that day and era.

During the shooting, Gowariker suffered from a slipped disc and had to rest for 30 days. During this period, he had his bed next to the monitor and continued with his work.

The filming schedule spanned the winter and summer, commencing in early January 2000 and finishing in mid-June. This was physically challenging for many, with the temperatures ranging from 0 to 50 °C (32 to 122 °F). The actors had to drink frequently and sit in the shade. The schedule was strict. The day began at 6 am, changing into costumes and getting onto the actors' bus, which took them to the sets in Kanuria. The actors, including Khan, all travelled on the same bus. If anyone missed it, it was up to them to reach the sets. One day, Khan was late and missed the actors' bus. That day, his wife Reena, the executive producer, reprimanded him for being late. She told him he had to set an example for the rest of the crew. "If he started coming late, how could she tell the others to come on time?" While on the sets, the actors were given call sheets with the day's timetable such as breakfast, hairstyling, make-up, costumes, etc.

== Release ==
Before its worldwide release, Khan kept a promise to screen the film to the locals of Bhuj. Lagaan clashed with Anil Sharma's Gadar: Ek Prem Katha, starring Sunny Deol and Ameesha Patel, at the box-office. The film made it to the UK Top 10 after its commercial release. It was the first Indian film to have a nationwide release in China and had its dubbed version released in Italy. With favorable reviews from the French press, Lagaan premiered in Paris on 26 June 2002 and continued to have an unprecedented nine weeks of screening with over 45,000 people watching. It was released in the United States, Canada, France, Germany, Japan, Malaysia, Hong Kong, South Africa and the Middle East with respective vernacular subtitles. The film took a cumulative of $2.5 million at the international box-office and ₹380 million (equivalent to ₹1.7 billion or US$17 million in 2026) at the domestic box-office.

In 2001, Lagaan had a world premiere at the International Indian Film Academy Awards (IIFA) weekend in Sun City, South Africa. The Locarno International Film Festival authorities published the rules of cricket before the film was screened to a crowd which reportedly danced to its soundtrack in the aisles. Lagaan was shown 4 times due to public demand as against the usual norm of showcasing films once at the festival. It subsequently won the Prix du Public Award at the festival. After the film's publicity in Locarno, the director, Gowariker said that distributors from Switzerland, Italy, France, Netherlands, North Africa, Finland and Germany were wanting to purchase the distribution rights. Special screenings were held in Russia, where people were keen to watch the film after its Oscar nomination.

Apart from these screenings, it was shown at the Sundance Film Festival, Cairo International Film Festival, Stockholm International Film Festival, Helsinki Film Festival and the Toronto International Film Festival. The film is available on Netflix.

=== Home media ===
There were two releases for the DVD. The first, as a 2-DVD set, was released on 27 May 2002 in limited regions. It contained subtitles in Arabic, English, Hebrew, Hindi, Turkish and several European languages. It is available in 16:9 Anamorphic widescreen, Dolby Digital 5.1 Surround, progressive 24 frame/s, widescreen and NTSC format. It carried an additional fifteen minutes of deleted scenes, filmographies and trailers.

The second was released as anniversary edition 3-disc DVD box after 6 years of the theatrical release. This also included Chale Chalo which was a documentary on the making of Lagaan, a curtain-raiser on the making of the soundtrack, deleted scenes, trailers, along with other collectibles such as 11 collector cards, a collectible Lagaan coin embossed with the character of Bhuvan, a 35 mm CinemaScope filmstrip hand-cut from the film's filmstrip were bundled with the film. After its release, it became the highest-selling DVD in India, beating Sholay (1975). Chale Chalo – The Lunacy of Film Making, won the National Film Award for Best Exploration/Adventure Film.

A comic book, Lagaan: The Story, along with 2 colouring books, a mask book and a cricket board game were subsequently released to the commercial market. The comic book, available in English and Hindi, was targeted at children between the ages of 6 and 14. At the book's launch, Aamir Khan said that they were keen to turn the film into a comic strip during the pre-production phase itself.

In March 2002, a book titled The Spirit of Lagaan – The Extraordinary Story of the Creators of a Classic was published. It covers the making of the film, describing in detail the setbacks and obstacles that the crew faced while developing the film from concept to its release.

== Reception ==
=== Box office ===
The film initially grossed ₹65.97 crore (equivalent to ₹287 crore or US$30 million in 2026) worldwide in 2001. This made it the third highest-grossing Hindi film of 2001, behind Kabhi Khushi Kabhie Gham and Gadar: Ek Prem Katha.

Domestically, Lagaan grossed ₹55.13 crore (equivalent to ₹239 crore or US$25 million in 2026) in India. Its domestic net income was ₹34.31 crore, equivalent to ₹187 crore ($19 million) when adjusted for inflation.

With an overseas gross of ₹10.84 crore (US$2.2 million) in 2001, it was the year's second highest-grossing Indian film overseas, preceded only by Kabhi Khushi Kabhie Gham. Lagaan's overseas gross included £600,000 in the United Kingdom, US$910,000 in the United States and Canada, and US$180,000 in the Arab states of the Persian Gulf.

In China, where the film released on 16 May 2003, it grossed ¥3 million, equivalent to ₹ 1.71 crore (US$362,500).

Including the film's China collections, the film's total worldwide gross was ₹67.68 crore (US$14.533 million).

=== Critical reception ===
Lagaan was met with critical acclaim. On the review aggregator website Rotten Tomatoes, 95% of 64 critics' reviews are positive, with an average rating of 7.9/10. The website's consensus reads: "Lagaan is lavish, rousing entertainment in the old-fashioned tradition of Hollywood musicals." Metacritic, which uses a weighted average, assigned the film a score of 84 out of 100, based on 21 critics, indicating "universal acclaim".

Sudish Kamath of The Hindu suggested that "the movie is not just a story. It is an experience. An experience of watching something that puts life into you, that puts a cheer on your face, however depressed you might be." The Times of India wrote, "Lagaan has all the attractions of big-sounding A. R. Rahman songs, excellent performances by Aamir Khan... and a successful debut for pretty Gracy Singh. In addition, there is the celebrated David vs. Goliath cricket match, which has the audiences screaming and clapping."

Roger Ebert, writing for the Chicago Sun-Times, gave the film 3.5 out of 4 stars and wrote, "Lagaan is an enormously entertaining movie, like nothing we've ever seen before, and yet completely familiar... At the same time, it's a memory of the films we all grew up on, with clearly-defined villains and heroes, a love-triangle, and even a comic character who saves the day. Lagaan is a well-crafted, hugely entertaining epic that has the spice of a foreign culture." Derek Elley of Variety suggested that it "could be the trigger for Bollywood's long-awaited crossover to non-ethnic markets". Somni Sengupta of The New York Times, described it as "a carnivalesque genre packed with romance, swordplay and improbable song-and-dance routines". Dave Kehr, another New York Times film critic, called Lagaan "a movie that knows its business -- pleasing a broad, popular audience -- and goes about it with savvy professionalism and genuine flair." Kevin Thomas of the Los Angeles Times argued that the film is "an affectionate homage to a popular genre that raises it to the level of an art film with fully drawn characters, a serious underlying theme, and a sophisticated style and point of view."

Peter Bradshaw of The Guardian described the film as "a lavish epic, a gorgeous love story, and a rollicking adventure yarn. Larger than life and outrageously enjoyable, it's got a dash of Spaghetti Western, a hint of Kurosawa, with a bracing shot of Kipling." Kuljinder Singh of the BBC stated that "Lagaan is anything but standard Bollywood fodder, and is the first must-see of the Indian summer. A movie that will have you laughing and crying, but leaving with a smile."

Lagaan was listed as #14 on Channel 4's "50 Films To See Before You Die" and was the only Indian film to be listed. The film was also well received in China, where its themes resonated with Chinese audiences. It was ranked #55 in Empire magazine's "The 100 Best Films of World Cinema" in 2010. In 2011, John Nugent of the Trenton Independent called the film "a masterpiece ... and what better way to learn a bit about India's colonial experience! History and great entertainment, all rolled into one (albeit long) classic film." In 2021, American filmmaker James Gunn named Lagaan as his favorite Indian movie.

== Awards ==
Aamir Khan and Gowariker went to Los Angeles to generate publicity for the Academy Awards. Khan said, "We just started showing it to whoever we could, even the hotel staff." About India's official entry to the 2002 Oscars, The Daily Telegraph wrote, "A Bollywood film that portrays the British in India as ruthless sadists and Mafia-style crooks has been chosen as Delhi's official entry to the Academy Awards." It added that the film was expected to win the nomination.

On 12 February 2002, Lagaan was nominated for the best foreign language film at the Academy Award nominations ceremony. After the nomination, Khan reacted by saying, "To see the name of the film and actually hear it being nominated was very satisfying". Post-nomination reactions poured in from several parts of the world. USA Today wrote "Hooray for Bollywood, and India's Lagaan". With Sony Pictures Classics distributing the film and Oscar-winning director Baz Luhrmann praising it, Lagaan had a chance to win. The BBC commented that the nomination raised Bollywood hopes that Indian films would become more popular in the US. In India, the nomination was celebrated with news reports about a win bringing in "a great boost for the Indian film industry" and "a Bharat Ratna for Aamir Khan and the status of a 'national film' for Lagaan".

When Lagaan lost the award to the Bosnian film No Man's Land, there was disappointment in India. Khan said, "Certainly we were disappointed. But the thing that really kept us in our spirits was that the entire country was behind us." Filmmaker Mahesh Bhatt criticised the "American film industry" as "insular and the foreign category awards were given just for the sake of it." Gowariker added that "Americans must learn to like our films".

The film won a number of awards at Indian award ceremonies including eight National Film Awards, eight Filmfare Awards, eight Screen Awards and 10 IIFA Awards. Apart from these major awards, it also won awards at other national and international ceremonies.

== See also ==
- List of Asian historical drama films
- Cricket in film and television
