= Leah Borromeo =

British journalist and filmmaker

- Citizenship: USA
- Education: Decatur Classical School, Kenwood Academy, Chicago Academy for the Arts
- Alma mater: Goldsmiths' College, University of London
- Occupations: Journalist, filmmaker
- Known for: Documentary, journalism
- Notable work: The Mortician of Manila
- Website: disobedientfilms.com

Leah Borromeo is a British-American journalist and filmmaker based in London, who has worked for Sky News, The Guardian and the Daily Mail. Borromeo directed "The Mortician of Manila" for Al Jazeera English about a man who runs a 24-hr mortuary during Filipino President Rodrigo Duterte's so-called "war on drugs". Borromeo has also directed the unreleased documentary The Cotton Film: Dirty White Gold., which is a comprehensive document of the cotton supply chain from "seed to shop" that explores fashion manufacturing to merchandising and end of life use through the lens of farmer suicides.

== Early life ==
Leah Delfin Borromeo II was born June 1979 in Chicago to parents Leah Delfin Borromeo and Eduardo Borromeo, a realtor.

== Career ==
Borromeo has worked for Sky News, has written a column on sustainability and ethics for The Guardian and has also written for the Daily Mail. She made a series of short films on arts activism for Channel 4’s Random Acts and hosted Resonance FM’s The Left Bank Show. Borromeo has worked with Peter Kennard on several projects after she interviewed him for a book Beyond The Street. They have also worked together on several films on Syrian Crises.

Borromeo had a regular slot presenting arts and culture on Tariq Ali's show for TeleSUR English.

=== The Cotton Film ===
In 2013, Borromeo started working on The Cotton Film: Dirty White Gold, which documents the epidemic of suicides amongst cotton farmers in India. Borromeo started working on the movie after she went on a self-funded junket with a clothing brand to check out their supply chain for an article she was writing in 2009. While researching the article, she came across farmer suicides. She took the idea of making a film to Dartmouth Films and crowdfunded the film's production and trailer.

== Controversies ==
While Borromeo was protesting in a G20 campaign, she was charged with ten others on two counts of impersonating a police officer. She was following a group called Space Hijackers, who were travelling in an armoured personnel carrier adorned with toy machine guns. Borromeo later quipped that if she was guilty of impersonating anyone, it would be a stripper and not a police officer as she was wearing a boiler suit rolled down to the waist to reveal a black bra.
