= People's Archive of Rural India =

Digital journalism platform in India

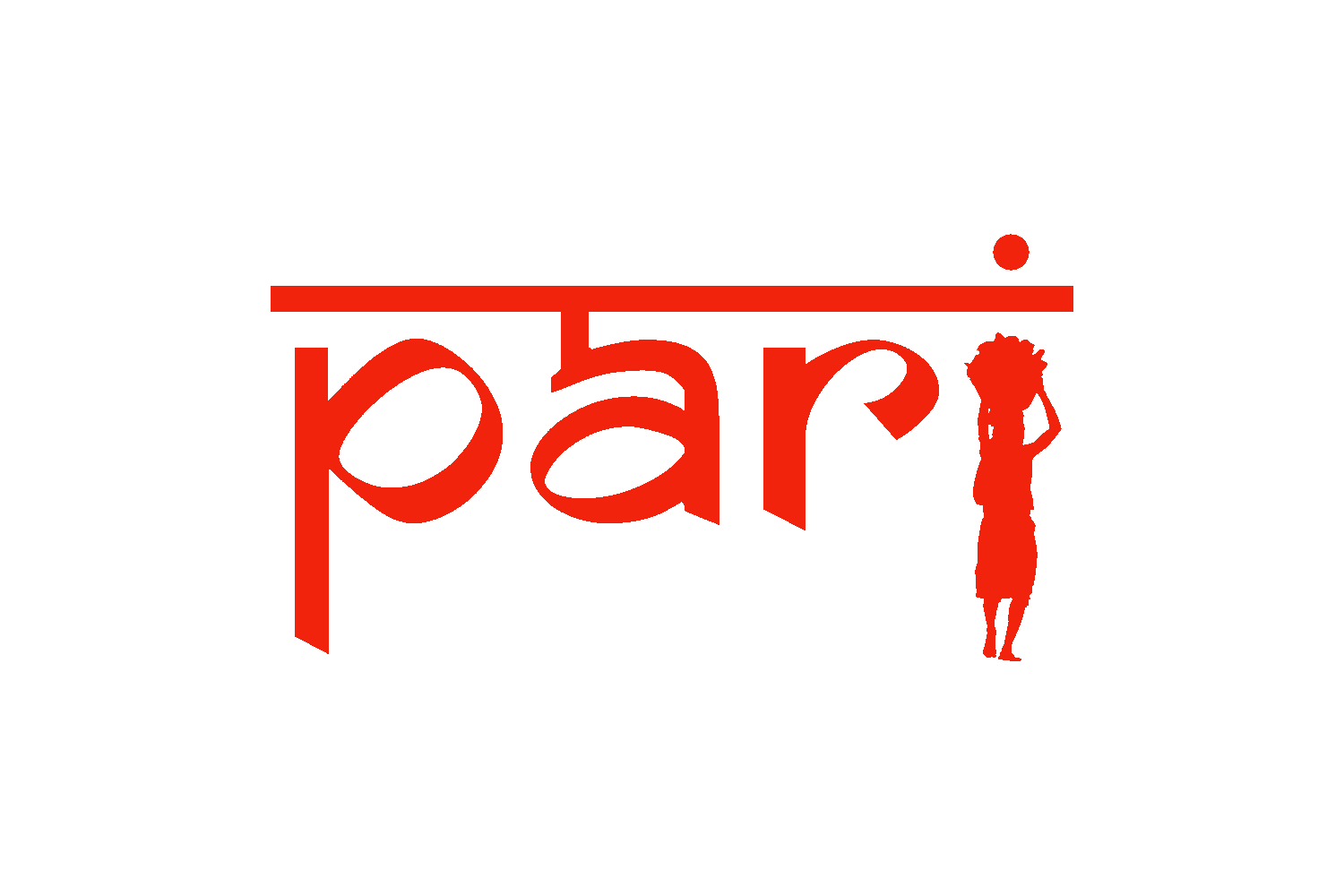
- Logo of People's Archive of Rural India
- Website type: Digital Journalism
- Available in: English – and also Assamese, Bengali, Gujarati, Hindi, Kannada, Malayalam, Marathi, Odia, Punjabi, Tamil, Telugu, Urdu (of these, the most translations are in Hindi, Marathi, Odia, Tamil, Urdu)
- Area served: Online
- Owner: CounterMedia Trust
- Founder: Palagummi Sainath
- Key people: Aakanksha; Binaifer Bharucha; Jaideep Hardikar; Jyoti Shinoli; Kanika Gupta; Kavitha Muralidharan; Medha Kale; Namita Waikar; Pratishtha Pandya; Priti David; Shalini Singh; Siddharth Adelkar; Sinchita Maji; Smita Khator; Urja; Zahra Latif
- Website: ruralindiaonline.org
- Commercial: No
- Launched: Dec 20, 2014
- Current status: Active

The People's Archive of Rural India (PARI /ˈpɑːri/) is a multimedia digital journalism platform in India. It was founded in December 2014 by veteran journalist Palagummi Sainath, former rural affairs editor of The Hindu, author of the book Everybody Loves a Good Drought and winner of over 50 national and international awards.

PARI focuses on rural journalism and publishes stories, videos and photo stories in numerous categories, including, Farming and its Crisis, Adivasis, Dalits, Women, Healthcare, The Rural in the Urban and Resource Conflicts. It showcases the occupational, linguistic and cultural diversity of India, and aims to publish stories with detail and authenticity, which provide readers, listeners and viewers with a context to derive information and knowledge from.

PARI stories are usually translated into various Indian languages by a team of translators and translation editors across India, most of them volunteers. PARI regularly publishes in 10 languages besides the default English.

Additionally, PARI hosts a free online Library with a growing collection of reports, surveys and other material relevant to understanding and contextualising rural India. And the site attempts to map the facial diversity across India through its unique FACES section.

N. Ram, former editor-in-chief and publisher of The Hindu referred to PARI as "...one of the brightest spots of public-spirited journalism” at the Lawrence Dana Pinkham Memorial Lecture on May 3, 2016.

== Content ==
=== Stories ===
PARI is a journalism website and a “living, breathing archive” – it is not a hard news website, but aims to be topical in its coverage of rural India. It publishes stories in around 26 categories which include Things We Do, Things We Make, Women, Adivasis, Musafir, Environment, Resource Conflicts, The Wild, Healthcare, The Rural in the Urban and others.

In several instances, PARI's stories are published as an ongoing series. A few of these are:

==== a. Covering COVID-19 ====
This series contains PARI's stories of ordinary Indians such as stranded migrant workers, farmers, sanitation workers, pastoral nomads, artisans, construction labourers, rural schoolteachers and students, and others, who were severely impacted by the nationwide COVID-19 lockdown that began in March 2020. This ongoing series, documenting and recording people's stories and struggles beyond the lockdown too, covers over 20 states and 35 regions. These include articles done from the field, multimedia stories, photo essays and videos, as well as documents, reports and laws relevant to the pandemic-lockdown period in the PARI Library.

Included in this series are also songs, poems and paintings inspired by the great migrant journeys, or as artistic expressions on the distress of the lockdown and pandemic.

==== b. Farmers’ protests ====
PARI has extensively covered farmers’ rallies and movements across the country, including the protests against the three farm laws that were passed by the Indian government in September 2020. The protesting farmers have said that these laws will destroy their livelihoods by offering large corporates even greater power over farming, and by undermining the main forms of state support to the cultivator.

The website also contains numerous reports on the Nashik to Mumbai march in March 2018, when tens of thousands of farmers demanded loan waivers, better crop prices, forest rights, and other measures. PARI also covered the landmark Kisan Mukti Morcha in Delhi on November 29–30, 2018, which brought together farmers, labourers and others from across India, demanding a 21-day session of Parliament to focus on the agrarian crisis to cover bills on debt and remunerative prices, the water crisis, land reforms, the rights of women, Dalit and Adivasi farmers, and more.

This series focuses on understanding and writing about who these farmers are – as individuals, as communities – besides their identities as farmers.

==== c. Climate change series ====
This series is a PARI-UNDP collaboration with articles on climate change from “multiple climate and agro-ecological zones across the country, through the voices and lived experiences of ordinary Indians.” These include stories on depleting coral reefs and native insect species, the experience of seaweed harvesters, changing temperature patterns, monoculture cash crops and human-wildlife conflict.

==== d. PARI series on women's health ====
This ongoing PARI series in partnership with the Population Foundation of India, aims to document the voices and stories of women's reproductive health across rural India. The stories revolve around “the stigma around infertility, the emphasis on female sterilisation, the lack of ‘male engagement’ in family planning, inadequate rural healthcare systems that too are out of reach for many, unqualified medical practitioners and dangerous childbirths, discrimination due to menstruation, the preference for sons – and more. Stories that speak of a wide range of health-related prejudices and practices, people and communities, gender and rights, and the everyday struggles and occasional small victories of women in rural India.”

==== e. Foot-Soldiers of Freedom ====
PARI has an exclusive category dedicated to India's last living freedom fighters, such as Captain Bhau, who led an anti-British uprising that resulted in the formation of a provisional government in Satara, Maharashtra, in 1943; and Salihan, an Adivasi woman from Odisha's Nuapada who single-handedly took on an armed British officer in 1930, when she was 16.

“We had fought for independence and freedom, but our contribution was forgotten,” said Captain Bhau (Ramchandra Sripati Lad), who led an anti-British uprising in Satara, Maharashtra, in 1943. With this film and article about me and my fellow soldiers, P. Sainath and PARI have revived the memory of prati sarkar [provisional government] and how it fought for people.”

==== f. The Grindmill Songs Project ====
This is a collection of over 100,000 ovi – couplets sung by the women of rural Maharashtra over generations, while toiling at the grindmill at home and performing other household tasks. These songs yield insights into village life and culture; gender, patriarchy, class, and caste issues; religion; and various contemporary social and political concerns. PARI aims to archive this collection through recordings, videos, transcripts, translations and stories.

==== g. Demonetisation ====
PARI's stories on demonetisation – when the Indian government, in November 2016, outlawed 86 per cent of the country's currency – cover its effects on devastated farmers, landless labourers, beedi-rollers, migrant workers, shop owners and many others across rural India.

==== h. Aadhaar in rural India ====
This PARI series covers stories about people denied rations, disability pensions, MGNREGA wages, scholarships and more, because of misspelt names, botched biometrics, and other such glitches in their Aadhaar cards.

==== i. PARI Anthologies ====
PARI Anthologies are collections of subject-specific stories, such as ‘Everyday lives in Ladakh and Kashmir’; ‘Train stories from rural India’; ‘The handlers of India's human waste’; ‘Into the precarious world of India's weavers’ and ‘Cattle stories from the countryside’.

==== j. A ‘textbook’ for the future ====
PARI aims to document the country's fast-changing countryside. Rural India is extremely diverse in occupations, arts and crafts, culture, literature, legend, transportation, and in other fields. But as the Indian countryside rushes through an extremely painful transformation, many of these features disappear, leaving us poorer. There are, for instance, probably more schools and styles of weaving in India than in any other single nation. Many of these traditional weaving communities face real collapse, which will rob the world of some of its greatest gifts. Similarly, there are other occupations in rural India which are experiencing decline, such as potters, toy-makers and toddy-tappers. Much of what makes the countryside unique could be gone in 20–30 years. Without any systematic record, visual or oral of this incredible diversity. With rural India losing worlds and voices of which future generations will know little or nothing, PARI aims to be a living journal, an archive and a textbook for the future.

==== k. Visible Work, Invisible Women ====
Visible Work, Invisible Women takes viewers around an entire exhibition of original photographs depicting the contribution that rural women make to the national economy. All the photographs were shot by P. Sainath across 10 Indian states between 1993 and 2002. Four sets of the physical version of this exhibition have been seen by over 700,000 viewers in India alone since 2002. Its display venues have included bus and railway stations, factory gates, mass rallies of agricultural and other labourers, schools, colleges and universities. The entire body of work is online on PARI.

=== PARI Library ===
The PARI library is an online compendium of publicly accessible documents and data on rural India, with sections such as climate change, health, gender, laws, agriculture and Dr. Babasaheb Ambedkar's writings. The library archives reports, journal articles, surveys, laws, reviewed research articles as well as literature and historical writings, for students, researchers and other readers to access for free. The PARI Health Archive is a collection of over 120 resources on health, nutrition, COVID-19 and related topics.

=== FACES ===
PARI's FACES project is a record of the facial and occupational diversity of India. It documents the faces of adults and children – along with their age, occupation and other details – from various blocks and districts of India.

=== PARI Education ===
PARI Education, launched on August 3, 2020, brings PARI stories to classrooms across India – as teaching resources, by aiding project work, and by familiarising teachers with rural issues. It aims to sensitise a new generation to lives and livelihoods in rural India. The PARI Education co-website also serves as a platform for stories, videos, photo essays and comics created by students. PARI's collaborations so far (since August 2018) with over 70 educational institutions include conducting classroom sessions, looking for ways to engage in the curriculum, working with teachers to use PARI stories in the classroom, co-designing courses which incorporate PARI material.

=== Multi-lingual ===
PARI is the first media website in India to publish its articles in several Indian languages, including Assamese, Bengali, Gujarati, Hindi, Kannada, Malayalam, Marathi, Odia, Punjabi, Telugu, Tamil and Urdu.

=== PARI Publications ===
On October 31, 2020, PARI, in collaboration with independent publishing house Karadi Tales, launched a series of children's books based on PARI stories from different parts of rural India. The books are No Nonsense Nandhini by Aparna Karthikeyan, No Ticket, Will Travel by Subuhi Jiwani, House of Uncommons by Vishaka George, Coming Home by Priti David and A Big Splash by Nivedha Ganesh.

== PARI Fellows and fellowships ==
The People's Archive of Rural India aims to position a PARI Fellow in every single one of the country's roughly 100 regions, most of which are untouched by the ‘national’ media. The Fellows could be reporters, writers, filmmakers, photographers and everyday residents of the regions. The network of Fellows that PARI builds will also reflect the social composition of the country. Half of the nearly 100 Fellows will be women. And Dalit journalists, Adivasi journalists and those from the minorities will also be represented in a fair manner. Each PARI Fellow works on a specific region for a year, spending at least three months full-time in fieldwork amongst the region's people and communities. PARI has had 24 Fellows since 2015, who have reported stories from over 30 regions. Some of the PARI Fellows are – Anubha Bhonsle (2015 & 2019), Purusottam Thakur (2015), Arpita Chakrabarty (2016), Ratna Bharali Talukdar (2016), Ritayan Mukherjee (2016), Urvashi Sarkar (2016), Bhasha Singh (2017), Parth M. N. (2017), Rahul M. (2017), M. Palani Kumar (2019) and Sanket Jain (2019).

== Impact ==
- Stories reported on PARI have been re-published on several platforms. These include the BBC Hindi, BBC Marathi, BloombergQuint, Economic & Political Weekly, Firstpost, Gaon Connection, HuffPost India, India Cultural Forum, Khabar Lahariya, Mathrubhumi Weekly, Max Maharashtra, Scroll, The Shillong Times, The Logical Indian, The Quint, The Wire, Times of India, and Tlaxcala.
- PARI stories are used as teaching material in undergraduate and post-graduate courses at various universities in India and abroad. These include the Tata Institute of Social Sciences, Ashoka University, Visvabharati University, and South Asia Studies departments at US universities – and numerous other educational institutions.
- A group of journalists in Karnataka – including G. N. Mohan – brought out a PARI Reader – Ee ‘Pari’ya Sobagu in Kannada on July 1, 2016. Many of these stories have found their way into district newspapers, some of which may not have web editions.
- People's Archive of Rural Nova Scotia (PARNS) says on its site that it takes inspiration from PARI. Another such initiative is Janaavishkara, a people's participatory portal in Kerala.

Additionally, various PARI stories have had a wide range of impacts. Some of these are:

- Good enough to vote, not enough for Aadhaar (March, 2018) an article by Puja Awasthi, was cited in Justice D. Y. Chandrachud's September 26, 2018 Supreme Court judgement on Aadhaar. The story documents the problems faced by persons with leprosy who have been denied pensions because they were unable to get enrolled in the Aadhaar system. The article notes that the Aadhaar process can bring about a denial of benefits.
- Kali: The dancer and his dreams (June, 2014) is a story by Aparna Karthikeyan, about a male dancer from Tamil Nadu, from a Dalit community, who has mastered Bharatanatyam and three other folk dance-forms. Kali has since won several awards, and has been featured in several publications. After Aparna's story Small farmer, big heart, miracle bike (March, 2016) about Chandra Subramanian – a single mom, cultivator and retailer in Sivagangai district, Tamil Nadu – Chandra has been featured in several publications, and received an award. Many people have reached out to assist her in significant ways.
- The last post – and a bridge too far (June, 2016), a story about a post office in Pithoragarh district, Uttarakhand, by Arpita Chakrabarty (2016 PARI Fellow) was picked up widely on social media immediately on publishing. Within four days of the article being published, Pitthorgarh — where people sometimes travelled 70 kilometres to collect their mail — finally had its own post office.
- What's in a name? The agonies of Aadhaar (January, 2018), which Rahul M. (2017 PARI Fellow) wrote from Anantapur, Andhra Pradesh, is about a typographical error in a schoolgirl's Aadhaar card that cost her a primary school scholarship. The problem was resolved after PARI published this story.
- Copying our designs is not correct (May, 2019) by Priti David is about how despite a GI certification the distinctive Toda embroidery of the Nilgiris was being widely copied. The story led to the case being taken up by Poompuhar, the Tamil Nadu Handicrafts Development Corporation Ltd. It has also been used as a case study in the National Institute of Fashion Design, and in other design schools.
- In their story Sowing the seeds of climate crisis in Odisha (October, 2019) Chitrangada Choudhury and Aniket Aga spoke of how the increase in Bt-cotton acreage in Odisha's Rayagada district was causing an alarming ecological shift in the region. After it was published, Odisha's Directorate of Agriculture and Food Production asked all district officers in a letter to create awareness among farmers about the restriction on the use of glyphosate and Paraquat dichloride.
- Gauri Adelkar, a writer and director based between the US and Mumbai, made a short film in 2018 called The Little Goddess – inspired by PARI's coverage of Bahurupi artists in West Bengal. The film features 12-year-old Durga and her family, who depend on Bahurupi – a vanishing performance art – to survive.
- When ‘Salihan’ took on the Raj (August, 2015) by P. Sainath (Founder Editor, PARI) speaks of Demathi Dei Sabar, freedom fighter from Odisha's Nuapada district, who took on an armed British officer with a lathi. Rahul Ramanathan (then a 13-year-old from Ahmedabad, Gujarat) retold her story in pictures in a PARI book called Salihan.

== Awards ==
PARI has won 31 awards since its launch in December 2014. WAN-IFRA's South Asian Digital Media Awards in the category 'Best Special Project for COVID-19', the Laadli Media and Advertising Award for Gender Sensitivity, Prem Bhatia Award for Journalism on Environment and Development issues, the Ramnath Goenka Award and the Silver Lotus (Rajat Kamal) at the 63rd National Film Awards are some of the accolades that PARI has received. The full list so far:

People's Archive of Rural India (PARI): Awards received from 2015 to 2021
S.No.	Year	Institution	Name of Award (and criteria as stated in the official citations)
31	2021	Public Relations Council of India, Goa	Senior Reporter Jaideep Hardikar won the Author/Writer of the Year award; PARI's Executive Editor Sharmila Joshi won the Best Story on Environment Awareness award for Churu: Blowing hot, blowing cold – mainly hot; and PARI Reporter Jigyasa Mishra won the Best Story on Water Management award for Footprints of protest in the sands of a mine.
30	2021	Fukuoka City Foundation and Citizens of the City	P. Sainath wins the Fukuoka Grand Prize for his outstanding journalism and as the founder of PARI. The award is conferred every year to honour individuals who have made contributions to the fields of Asian studies, Asian art and Asian culture.
29	2021	ACJ Journalism Awards	PARI Women's Health series wins the Special Mention award in the Investigative Journalism category for stories published in the series in the year 2020. The award goes to: Kavitha Muralidharan, Anubha Bhonsle, Priti David, Amruta Byatnal, Jyoti Shinoli, Sanskriti Talwar, Pallavi Prasad, Medha Kale and Jigyasa Mishra for their stories from February to November 2020 in the series: PARI series on women's health.
28	2021	Spoortidhamma	P. Sainath wins the Bodhivruksha Award for his journalism work and as the founder of PARI. The award is conferred every year on people who have dedicated their lives to enable and empower the socially excluded communities through their meaningful interventions.
27	2020	WAN-IFRA ‘s South Asian Digital Media Awards	The PARI Team won the silver prize of WAN-IFRA's South Asian Digital Media Awards, 2020. PARI bagged the Silver in the category 'Best Special Project for COVID-19'. Beginning from the last week of March, PARI has published nearly 150 landmark stories and documents related to impact of the lockdown on the livelihoods and daily lives of the most marginalised segments of India.
26	2020	Press Institute of India-International Committee of the Red Cross media award	PARI Reporter Jigyasa Mishra won a Press Institute of India-International Committee of the Red Cross media award for her story Footprints of protest in the sands of a mine (June 6, 2020) in the category Best Article on a Humanitarian Subject. The story records the courageous and inspirational battle of women farmers to save the Ken, one of Bundelkhand's major rivers, from the depredations of a sand mining mafia.
25	2020	Laadli Media and Advertising Award for Gender Sensitivity	PARI Reporter Jyoti Shinoli won a Laadli Media and Advertising Award for Gender Sensitivity, 2020 for the story No crime, unending punishment (August 10, 2018), a searing account of the unending persecution of the Pardhis, a de-notified tribe.
24	2020	Prem Bhatia Memorial Trust, New Delhi	The PARI Team won the Prem Bhatia Award for journalism on Environment and Development issues “for its extensive field reports, including climate change effects and the impact of the pandemic on rural India.”
23	2020	Public Relations Council of India, Bengaluru	PARI Fellow M. Palani Kumar won the Communicator of the Year – Best Story of the Year award for Tamil Nadu's seaweed harvesters in rough seas (October 31, 2019). This is a photo story about an unusual activity of the fisherwomen of Bharathinagar in Tamil Nadu, which keeps them more in the water than on boats. And how climate change and overexploitation of marine resources are eroding their livelihoods.
22	2020	Public Relations Council of India, Bengaluru	PARI Reporter Jyoti Shinoli won the Communicator of the Year – Best Content of the Year award for her story Pardhi school bull-dozed by Prosperity Highway (June 17, 2019). The story is about a school in Amravati district, Maharashtra, started by a Phanse Pardhi teacher for kids from his long-stigmatised and impoverished community, which was demolished on June 6, 2019, leaving them anxious and uncertain.
21	2019	Press Institute of India and the International Committee of the Red Cross, New Delhi	PARI Fellow Urvashi Sarkar won the first prize in the Best Article category for her article ‘Our houses are vanishing. Nobody cares’ (July 20, 2018). The story tracks climate-related displacement and looks at the migration of people between Sagar and Ghoramara Islands in West Bengal, and the vanishing of islands, homes and livelihoods.
20	2019	Jio MAMI Mumbai Film Festival 2019	PARI Fellow Yashaswini Raghunandan's film was selected for the INDIA GOLD category at the festival, for her film That Cloud Never Left.
19	2019	FILAF film festival, Perpignan, France: Festival International du Livre d'Art et du Film	PARI Fellow Yashaswini Raghunandan won the GOLD FILAF at the FILAF film festival in France (Festival International du Livre d'Art et du Film) for her film That Cloud Never Left.
18	2019	Tutti I Premi Del Pesaro Film Fest, Pesaro, Italy	PARI Fellow Yashashwini Raghunandan received a special mention for the film That Cloud Never Left at this festival in Pesaro, Italy.
17	2019	Mumbai Press Club	PARI Reporter Jyoti Shinoli won the Red Ink Award in the Women's Empowerment and Gender Equality category for her story Collecting 6,000 leaves a day for a living (May 3, 2018).
16	2019	Indian Express Group, New Delhi	PARI Fellow Parth M. N. won the Ramnath Goenka Award (in the Uncovering India Invisible category) for his series of stories on Marathwada published on PARI.
15	2018	The Statesman, Kolkata	PARI Author Puja Awasthi won the Statesman Prize for Rural Reporting for two stories published on PARI: Beaten but unbowed – Sunanda Sahoo's silent struggle (July 5, 2017). and Drums and dreams beyond pickle and papad (August 3, 2017).
14	2018	Population First, New Delhi	PARI Fellow Urvashi Sarkar received the Laadli Media and Advertising Award for Gender Sensitivity, 2017, in the Features category for her story Widowed by tigers, abandoned by the state, (October 12, 2017).
13	2018	European Commission, Brussels, Belgium	PARI Fellow Parth M. N. received the Lorenzo Natali Media Prize for the story Cutting cane for 2000 hours (February 6, 2018).
12	2018	South Asian Short Film Festival, Kolkata	15 of PARI's video films were selected for SASFF-2018: 13 films in the Competition Documentary category and 2 in the Official Panorama category. (For more on this see below.)
11	2018	Parigi Hanumantha Rao Foundation, Andhra Pradesh	PARI Fellow Rahul M. received the Parigi Hanumantha Rao journalism award for 2017–2018, for his stories published on PARI.
10	2018	Vasant Vyakhyanmala, Pune, Maharashtra	The first Justice M. G. Ranade Award (inaugural year), recognising the unique nature of the new journalism “initiative called the People's Archive of Rural India.”
9	2017	Sri Murugamath, Vhitradurga, Karnataka	The Basavashree Award for “service rendered through the People's Archive of Rural India to the rural folk in the way of a Journalism Movement.”
8	2017	Appan Menon Memorial Committee, New Delhi	Appan Menon Memorial Award for “the work being done by the People's Archive of Rural India to document life in rural India.”
7	2017	C-Shell Media and Literary Awards, Dubai	C-Shell Journalism Prize, for “extraordinary and in-depth reporting of rural India and the unique achievement that is PARI.”
6	2017	Kesari Mahratta Trust and Tilak Maharashtra Vidyapeeth, Pune	Lokmanya Bal Gangadhar Tilak award for Excellence in Journalism to P. Sainath/PARI (recognising his launch of PARI)
5	2016	Anant Bhalerao Smriti Foundation, Aurangabad	The Anant Bhalerao Smriti Puraskar for “incisive reporting of rural India, the People's Archive of Rural India and its approach to boosting journalism in Indian languages.”
4	2016	Krantisinh Nana Patil Foundation, Sangli, Maharashtra	Krantisinh Nana Patil Memorial Award to P. Sainath (recognising, also, the importance of PARI).
3	2016	National Film Awards, Government of India, New Delhi	PARI Fellows (2015) Nidhi Kamath and Keya Vaswani received the Silver Lotus (Rajat Kamal) for the Best Promotional Film at the 63rd National Film Awards 2016 for their film Weaves of Maheshwar (published on PARI on May 2, 2016).
2	2016	Praful Bidwai Memorial Committee, New Delhi	The first Praful Bidwai Memorial Prize for “his reportage and commentary on agrarian distress and the source of information and inspiration that is PARI.”
1	2015	Population First, Mumbai	PARI Fellow (2015) Purusottam Thakur received the Laadli Media and Advertising Award for Gender Sensitivity 2014–15 in the Best Investigative Story category for the story, Making history, heading for a hundred (published on PARI on March 20, 2015).
		Special Mention	In April 2020, the United States Library of Congress informed us that they had selected the PARI website for inclusion in their web archives: "We consider your website to be an important part of this collection and the historical record."

South Asian Short Film Festival 2018 and 2019

For the South Asian Short Film Festival in 2018, 15 PARI films were selected – 13 for the Competition Documentary category, and 2 for the Official Panorama Viewing category. These films ranged in duration from 6 to 18 minutes and were shot in Hindi, Bengali, Odia, Marathi, Malayalam, Ladakhi, Manipuri and Tamil. Some of the selected films were Tussar: the crumbling cocoon by Shreya Katyayini, Mending boats with music by V. Sasikumar, The fading weaves of Duajhar by Purusottam Thakur, Ima Keithel: every day is women's day by Anubha Bhonsle and others and Threadbare in Santipur by Sinchita Maji.

The South Asian Short Film Festival in 2019 selected five PARI films/videos for its Competition Documentary category. The films were shot in Bengali, Marathi, Malayalam, Manipuri and Hindi. The selected films were Ganpati Yadav's gripping life cycle by Sinchita Maji, Possessed by his art, a Bahurupi transforms by Ankan Roy and others, I feel so happy to see the paddy growing by Vishaka George and others, Into the chakshangs of Imphal by Anubha Bhonsle and others and Farming doesn't give us our sustenance by Subuhi Jiwani.
