= Namita Waikar =

Writer and entrepreneur

Namita Waikar is a novelist, entrepreneur and journalist from Pune, India. Waikar is the managing editor and co-founder of the People's Archive of Rural India.

In her debut novel, "The Long March", Waikar tells the story of an urban elite being forced to pay heed to the plight of the Indian farmers by a large march of rural farmers into the cities of the country. Written in 2012, this novel foresaw the long marches of farmers that captured the country's headlines in 2018.

Namita's debut novel was launched at the Jaipur Literature Festival where Namita has been a speaker since 2018.

Namita Waikar's leads and writes for the Grindmill Songs Project and oversees the translations program at People's Archive of Rural India
