= Shalini Singh =

Indian journalist

Shalini Singh is an Indian journalist. She was principal correspondent for The Week newsweekly in Delhi. She was part of the Delhi bureau writing on a range of news features and social trends with a focus on gender and women's issues, arts, and culture. On a Centre for Science and Environment fellowship in 2010, Shalini exposed the illegal mining in Goa and the devastation caused from unplanned tourism.

Singh is a founding member of the CounterMedia Trust and a regular contributor to the People's Archive of Rural India.

She is a fellow at the Nieman Foundation for Journalism at Harvard University for 2017-2018.

== Awards ==
For her work on environmental issues Singh received The Indian Express’ Ramnath Goenka award in 2013 and the first Cushrow Irani Prize given by The Statesman in 2011. Her citation for the Prem Bhatia award in 2012 commended her for her "vigilance, humane perspective and tenacity to pursue the issues that matter".
