= Palagummi Sainath =

Indian journalist

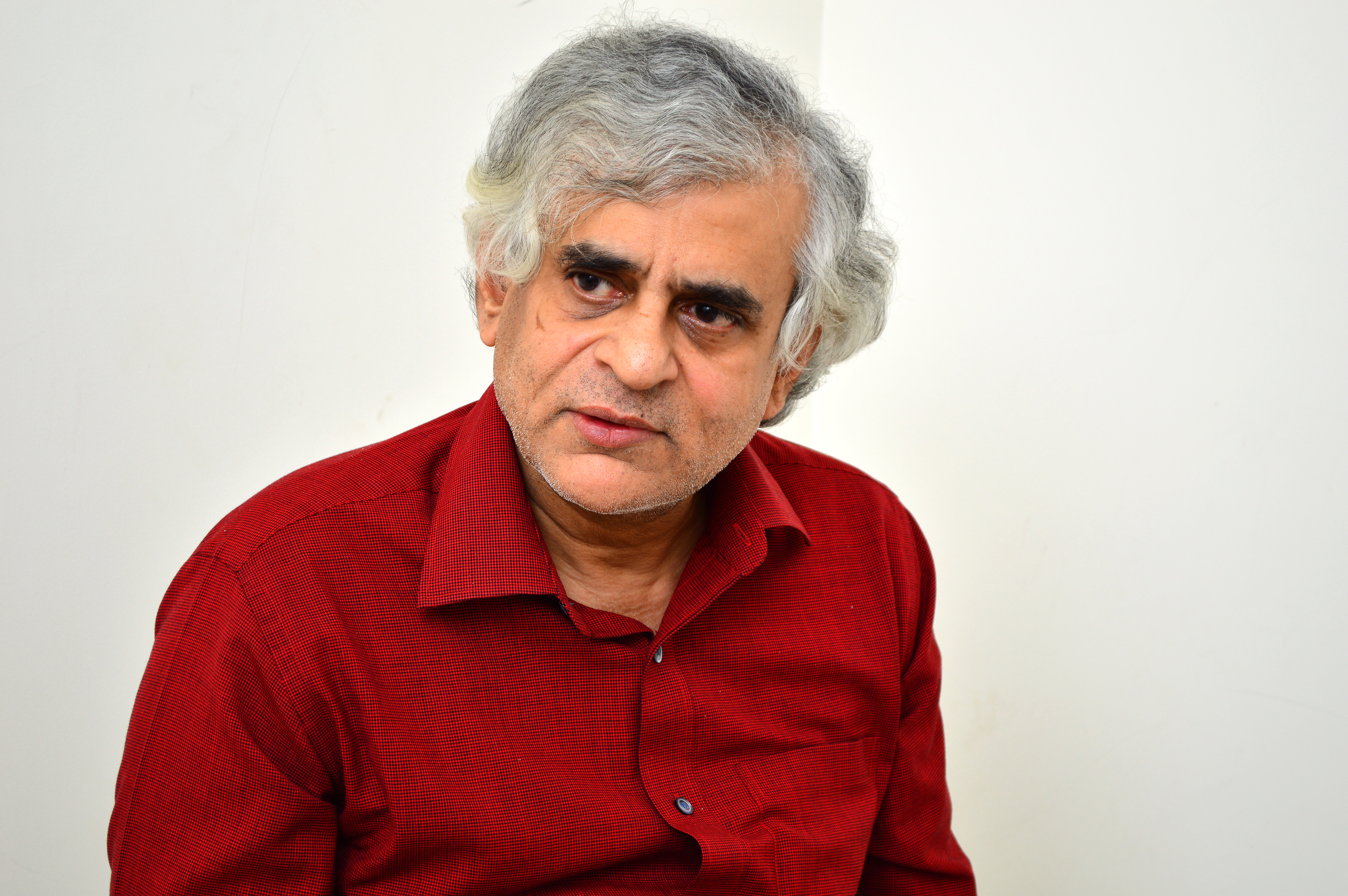
- Sainath in Attappadi, Kerala
- Born: 13 May 1957 (age 69); Madras, Madras State, India
- Education: Loyola College; Jawaharlal Nehru University
- Occupations: Journalist, Faculty Member at Sophia College for Women
- Notable work: Everybody Loves a Good Drought
- Relatives: V. V. Giri (grandfather)
- Awards: Ramon Magsaysay Award; PUCL Human Rights Journalism Award; Raja-Lakshmi Award
- Website: psainath.com

Palagummi Sainath (born 13 May 1957) is an Indian columnist and author of the acclaimed book Everybody Loves a Good Drought. He has extensively written on rural India, his notable interests are poverty, structural inequities, caste discrimination and farmers protests.

He founded the People's Archive of Rural India (PARI) in 2014, an online platform that focuses on social and economic inequality, rural affairs, poverty, and the aftermath of globalization in India. He was a senior fellow at Tricontinental: Institute for Social Research, and was earlier the Rural Affairs Editor at The Hindu until his resignation in 2014.

He has received many awards for his journalism. The economist Amartya Sen called him "one of the world's great experts on famine and hunger". His book Everybody Loves a Good Drought is a collection of his field reports as a journalist, and focuses on different aspects of rural deprivation in India.

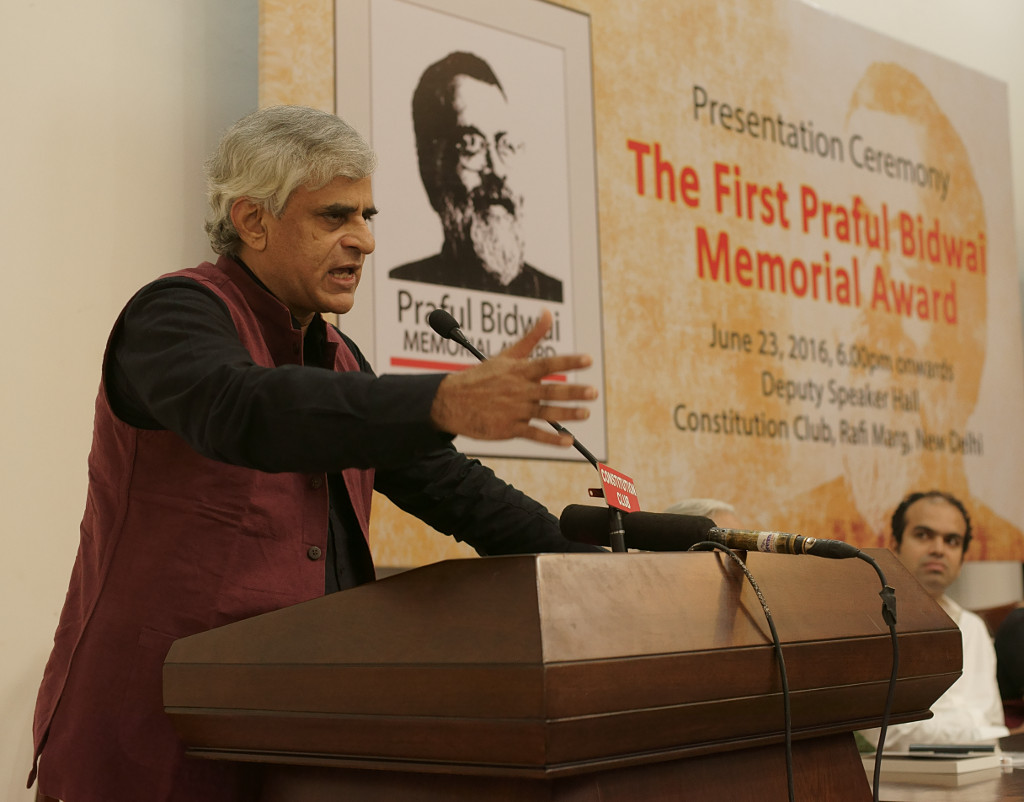
PARI receiving the Praful Bidwai Memorial Award

== Early life and education ==
Sainath was born into a Telugu speaking Brahmin family in Madras, Madras State (now Chennai, Tamil Nadu). He is the grandson of Indian politician and former President of India, V. V. Giri.

Sainath attended Loyola College in Chennai. He has a history degree from Jawaharlal Nehru University, Delhi.

== Career ==
Sainath started his career at the United News of India in 1980. He then worked for the Blitz, a major Indian weekly tabloid published from Mumbai, first as foreign affairs editor and then as deputy editor, which he continued for ten years.

In the fall of 2012, he served as the McGraw Professor of Writing at Princeton University. On 1 June 2015, Sainath became the first ThoughtWorks Chair Professor in Rural India and Digital Knowledge at the Asian College of Journalism. He won the inaugural World Media Summit Global Award for Excellence 2014 in Public Welfare for exemplary news professionals in developing countries.

Sainath served as the Coady Chair in Social Justice at St. Francis Xavier University.

Sainath is also a photographer. This exhibition Visible Work, Invisible Women: Women and work in rural India has been seen by more than 600,000 people in India alone. The exhibit toured internationally and included a showing at the Asia Society.

=== Research and books ===
The International Monetary Fund-led economic reforms launched in 1991 by Manmohan Singh constituted a watershed in India's economic history and in Sainath's career. He felt that the media's attention was moving from "news" to "entertainment" and consumerism and lifestyles of the urban elite gained prominence in the newspapers which rarely carried news of the reality of poverty in India.

He was awarded a fellowship and traveled to the ten poorest districts of five Indian states. He covered 100,000 km using sixteen forms of transportation and walked 5,000 km. He credits two editors at the Times with much of his success in getting the articles published, since it is one among the very newspapers that has been accused of shifting the onus from page one to page three. The paper ran 84 reports by Sainath across 18 months, many of them subsequently reprinted in his book Everybody Loves A Good Drought. The website India Together has archived the reports he filed at The Hindu.

His writing has provoked responses that include the revamping of the Drought Management Programs in the state of Tamil Nadu, development of a policy on indigenous medical systems in Malkangiri in Orissa, and revamping of the Area Development Program for tribal people in Madhya Pradesh state. The Times of India institutionalized his methods of reporting, and 60 other leading newspapers initiated columns on poverty and rural development.

In 2001, he was instrumental in the establishment of the Agriculture Commission in Andhra Pradesh to suggest ways for improving agriculture in that state:

The crisis states are AP, Rajasthan and Orissa. In the single district of Anantapur, in Andhra Pradesh, between 1997 and 2000, more than 1800 people have committed suicides, but when the state assembly requested these statistics, only 54 were listed. [see 29 April and 6 May 2001 issues of The Hindu, for more details]. Since suicide is considered a crime in India, the district crime records bureaus list categories for suicide – unrequited love, exams, husbands' and wives' behavior, etc.; in Anantapur, the total from these categories was less than 5%. The largest number, 1061 people, were listed as having committed suicide because of "stomach ache". This fatal condition results from consuming Ciba-Geigy's pesticide, which the government distributes free, and is almost the only thing the rural poor can readily acquire!!

Sainath, at an interaction program in Bangalore, revealed that the People's Archive of Rural India is going to commence operation on an experimental basis from June 2013. According to him this meant to serve as "an archive and living journal of history of rural India". He also clarified that the archive will not accept any direct funding by the government or corporate houses and that it will be an independent body. Sainath cited "Rural India is the most complex part of the planet" as the reason for launching PARI.

== In literature or pop culture ==
Writer Manu Joseph caricatures Sainath using a character named "P Sathya" in his 2017 political thriller.

== Awards and honours ==
Sainath became the first Indian reporter to win the European Commission's Lorenzo Natali Prize for journalism in 1995. In 2000, he won the inaugural Amnesty International Global Human Rights Journalism Prize. That same year, he was awarded the United Nations' Food & Agriculture Organisation's Boerma Prize.

In 2002, he was given the Inspiration Award at the Global Visions Film Festival in Edmonton, Canada. During the decade, Sainath toured ten drought-stricken states in India. This tour inspired him to write his book Everybody Loves a Good Drought.

He was awarded the Harry Chapin Media Award in New York in 2006.

Sainath was awarded the 2007 Ramon Magsaysay Award for Journalism Literature and Creative Communications Arts. He was given the award for his "passionate commitment as a journalist to restore the rural poor to India's national consciousness". He was the first Indian to win the Magsaysay in that category after R.K. Laxman in 1984.

He was the 2007 winner of Ramnath Goenka 'Journalist of the Year' award from The Indian Express.

Sainath has not accepted government awards, stating in 2009 that "Journalism should not be judged by government and journalists should not accept awards from governments they are covering or writing about". He therefore turned down the Padma Bhushan – India's third highest civilian award – in 2009.

On June 28, 2021, Sainath won the Fukuoka Grand Prize, one of Japan's most prestigious international awards that honours "individuals, groups or organisations who create as well as preserve the many distinct and diverse cultures of the Asian Region." In the 31-year history of the award, Sainath is the first Grand Prize Laureate from the field of journalism. Sainath contributed the 5-million-yen prize money for two purposes: Rs. 1 million to families of rural journalists who lost their lives to COVID-19, and Rs. 2.3 million to set up People's Archive of Rural India (PARI) fellowships for rural journalists from Dalit and Adivasi communities.

On July 7, 2021, the government of the state of Andhra Pradesh announced the winners of its new YSR Lifetime Achievement Awards. Sainath's was the first name in the journalist category for this prize that gives each winner Rs. 1 million. He, however, turned down the prize as it is his belief that journalists should not accept awards from governments they cover and critique. In his words "the journalist is an external auditor to government".

Canadian documentary film maker Joe Moulins made a film about Sainath titled A Tribe of his Own. When the jury at the Edmonton International Film Festival picked its winner, it decided to include Sainath in the award along with the maker of the film because this was 'an award about inspiration'. Another documentary film, Nero's Guests, looks at inequality (as manifest in India's agrarian crisis) through Sainath's reporting on the subject. Nero's Guests won the Indian Documentary Producers Association's gold medal for best documentary for 2010.

He was awarded a Doctor of Letters (D.Litt.) degree honoris causa by the University of Alberta in Edmonton in 2011 and another D.Litt by the St. Francis Xavier University, Nova Scotia, in 2017.

== Bibliography ==
Works by Palagummi Sainath

- Everybody Loves a Good Drought: Stories from India's Poorest Districts, Penguin Books, ISBN 0-14-025984-8
- The Last Heroes: Foot Soldiers of Indian Freedom, Penguin Books, ISBN 9780670096923

== See also ==
- Farmers' suicides in India
- Farmers' suicide in Western Orissa
