= Farmers' suicides in Canada =

Farmers' suicides in Canada refers to the occurrences of farmers who died by suicide across the country. Two of the most physically and mentally stressful occupations are farming and ranching, according to the Canadian Centre for Suicide Prevention and the Mental Health Commission of Canada. Based on the 2015 and 2016 surveys conducted by the University of Guelph researchers, compared to the general population, Canadian farmers were more prone to mental health issues, such as depression and anxiety because of the unique nature of agricultural work. Their risk of burnout was higher and their resilience lower.

== Overview ==
A study of farmers based on data gathered from 1971 to 1987, led by W. Pickett at Queen's University's Department of Emergency Medicine Canadian farmers, found that male farmer operators' suicide rates were lower than that of males in the general public. According to the study, whose findings were published in 1999 in the Chronic Diseases in Canada journal, during that period that ended in 1987, 1,457 cases of suicide were identified by the Canadian Farm Operator Cohort. The 1999 article said that the "high levels of social support" typical of farm communities in Canada may have been a factor in preventing the rate of suicide from reaching higher levels.

Pickett's findings in the 1999 report contrasted with those in more recent research including that undertaken by a team of researchers at the University of Guelph led by Andria Jones-Bitton, who is a veterinarian and an epidemiologist, as well as professor at the Ontario Veterinary College. In 2015–2016, Jones-Bitton's research team conducted an online survey of 1132 farmers using three psychometric scales—the Perceived Stress Scale (PSS), Hospital Anxiety and Depression Scale, and the Connor–Davidson Resilience Scale. The findings of their study were published in a 2020 journal article in Social Psychiatry and Psychiatric Epidemiology. Their research is believed to be the first in Canada to use these validated tools to "quantify resilience" and mental health in Canadian farmers. In the 2015–2016 poll, 45% of responders who participated reported high stress, 57% experienced anxiety, and 35% experienced depression.

Pickett's findings also contrasted with findings of the hearings and 2019 final report of the House of Commons Standing Committee on Agriculture and Agri-Food. The Committee held hearings from June 2018 through 9 May 2019 with various stakeholders to enhance understanding of mental health in the Canadian agriculture community. The resulting 70-page report was published in May 2019. The report cited a 2018 University of Regina study "found that suicide among agriculture, forestry and fishery workers was higher than in the rest of the population worldwide."

In the 2018 submission to the committee, Jones-Bitton, whose research informed the committee's "policy recommendations for farmers and mental illness", cautioned that Canadian farmers and ranchers compared to the general population, had lower levels of resilience and were prone to higher levels of stress and depression, which increased their risk of burnout. Jone-Bitton reported to the House that this not only threatened the well-being of the farming community, but also the Canadian agricultural sector's sustainability.

Since 2019, the mental health of farmers has been "identified as a priority" by the House of Commons Standing Committee on Agriculture and Agri-Food.

According to a 2021 fact sheet produced by the Centre for Suicide Prevention and the Mental Health Commission of Canada, "[i]n Canada, producers (farmers and ranchers) are especially prone to mental health challenges such as depression and anxiety, and they may have less resiliency because of the stressors they experience."

In a 2021 follow-up to their 2015–2016 University of Guelph study that examined farmers' mental health, a team of researchers under Jones-Bitton reported that "one in four farmers felt their life was not worth living."

In order to reduce farmer suicides in Ontario, the Ontario-based Guardian Network was established. The Guardian Network is a volunteer, peer-driven community of mental health advocates that supports Ontario’s farming community. According to the Agriculture Wellness Ontario program, of the Canadian Mental Health Association-Ontario, the Guardian Network equips volunteer guardians with strategies and tools to identify when someone is struggling with their mental health or having thoughts of suicide; have constructive conversations about their struggles and open up the discussion around mental health; and connect individuals with appropriate mental health and crisis resources.

Lead researcher Rebecca Purc-Stephenson, a psychology professor at the University of Alberta, studied the mental health crisis among farmers, aiming to move beyond simple death statistics and create a comprehensive profile of these individuals. As the lead researcher for AgKnow, a non-profit mental health initiative for farmers, she emphasized the importance of understanding the person behind the statistics to develop effective suicide prevention interventions. Purc-Stephenson and her team introduced the Farming Adversity-Resilience Management (FARM) framework, an analytical tool mapping the intertwining risk factors, guiding future research and improved prevention measures.

The study revealed that consecutive years of poor crop yields, livestock epidemics, or unexpected equipment breakdowns could lead to significant financial strain, trapping farmers in a cycle of adversity. Beyond financial concerns, the crisis often touched on questions of legacy, as farmers who died by suicide were deeply connected to their farms and could not envision themselves in any other occupation. Many of these individuals, especially men, were described as hard-working, strong, and private, taking pride in being the stoic breadwinners for their families. Purc-Stephenson identified stoicism and the pressure to succeed as a perilous combination.

Addressing the issue requires family and community support, reducing stigma, and prioritizing greater access to healthcare in rural areas, including farmer-tailored counseling services. Purc-Stephenson stressed the urgency of implementing these measures to prevent further tragedies in the farming community.

== Occupational stressors ==
Three main stressors include weather, workload, and finances. A second snowfall with "15 centimetres of heavy, wet snow" in October 2018 prevented the harvest on a third of one family farm Peace River Country, Alberta which meant that they did not have enough to pay all their bills. In Prince Edward Island the first hard frost appeared in September 2018 meant that farmers had to abandon crops like "potatoes, corn, soybeans and a lot of horticultural crops" making that winter much more difficult for many farmers.

=== COVID-19 pandemic related stressors ===
In 2020, farmers were also faced with new challenges such as increased costs and a lack of workers either because they were sick with COVID-19 or because of pandemic-related travel bans that prevented seasonal workers from entering the country. With fewer farm workers and truck drivers there were backlogs in farm processing.

== Saskatchewan ==
In June 2017, the #AgWeGottaDoMore hashtag was created by a Kim Keller, a Saskatchewan farmer who was alarmed that her peers had laughed at a recent farmer suicide. She had urged farmers to do more for those seeking help. Along with others they established the Do More Agriculture Foundation.

== International comparison ==
A 2018 article in The Guardian, described a global farmer suicide crisis citing countries such as the United States, the United Kingdom, Australia, France, and India. A 2005 literature review of 52 scholarly publications from Canada, India, Sri Lanka, the United States, and Australia identified farmers as having the highest rates of suicide compared to other industries. The 2005 review said that the causes include financial stress and the uncertainties associated with farming. In advanced economies there is a significantly higher suicide rate among farmers than the general population.

== See also ==
- Farmers' suicides in India
  - Farmers' suicides in western Odisha, India
- Farmers' suicides in the United States
