= Everybody Loves a Good Drought =

Nonfiction book

Everybody loves a good drought
- First edition
- Author: P. Sainath
- Language: English
- Genre: Social and Welfare
- Published: 1996
- Publisher: Penguin
- Publication place: India
- Pages: 470 (Paperback edition)
- ISBN: 0-14-025984-8 (Paperback edition)
- OCLC: 36806980
- Dewey Decimal: 823 21
- LC Class: HC440.P6 S245 1996

Everybody Loves a Good Drought is a book, by P. Sainath, about his research findings of poverty in the rural districts of India. The book won him the Ramon Magsaysay Award.

Sainath wrote the book by combining 84 articles that he had written from 1990 to 1992 for the Times of India, while residing in the poorest villages in the interiors of India, especially Tamil Nadu, what today is referred to as Telangana, Andhra Pradesh, Orissa, Madhya Pradesh and what is today referred to as Chhattisgarh on a two-year Bennett and Coleman fellowship. The articles give extensive detail of how various government projects do and do not work at the ground level, and whether they actually deliver any of their promised results in reality. He wrote the stories by detailing out the projects as well as the lives of villagers living in these places, supplementing them with detailed statistics.

Divided into separate sections based on the issues that the chapters deal with, the book scathingly unveils how trickle up and down theories do not work in reality in the country, and the stunningly high levels of corruption in so called development projects.

The book is considered one of the most detailed, authentic, highly regarded and readable studies of 1980s rural India.

To make rural stories more accessible, excerpts from the book have been also published on People's Archive of Rural India.
