= Farmers' suicides in India =

Public issue

Farmers' suicides in India refers to the event of farmers dying by suicide in India since the 1970s, due to their inability to repay loans mostly taken from private landlords and banks. India being an agrarian country with around 70% of its rural population depending directly or indirectly upon agriculture, the sector had a 15% share in the economy of India in 2023, and according to NSSO, around 45.5% of country's labor force was associated with agriculture in 2022. Activists and scholars have offered several conflicting reasons for farmer suicides, such as anti-farmer laws, high debt burdens, poor government policies, corruption in subsidies, crop failure, mental health, personal issues and family problems.

The National Crime Records Bureau data shows that while 296,438 farmers had died by suicide between 1995 and 2014, in the nine years between 2014 and 2022, the number stood at 100,474. In 2022, a total of 11,290 persons involved in the farming sector (5,207 farmers and 6,083 agricultural labourers) have died by suicide in India, accounting for 6.6% of total suicide victims in the country.

Earlier, governments had reported varying figures, from 5,650 farmer suicides in 2014 to the highest number of farmer suicides in 2004 of 18,241. The farmer's suicide rate in India had ranged between 1.4 and 1.8 per 100,000 population, over a 10-year period through 2005. However, the figures in 2017 and 2018 showed an average of more than 10 suicides daily or 5760 suicides per year. There are accusations of states manipulating the data on farmer suicides, hence the real figures could be even higher.

== History ==
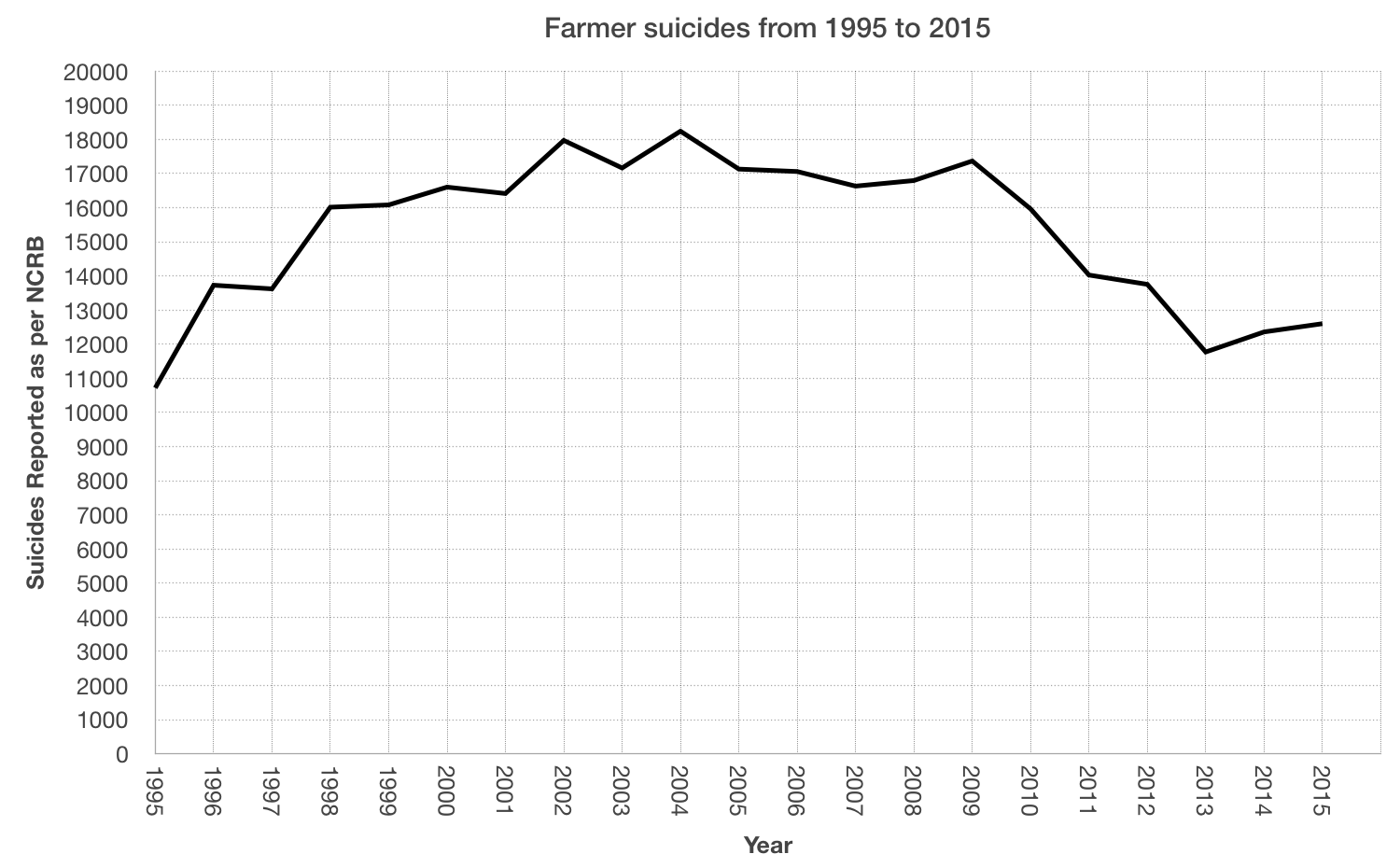
Total No of Farmer suicides reported in India per year as NCRBC, India

Historical records relating to frustration, revolts, and high mortality rates among farmers in India, particularly cash crop farmers, date back to the 19th century. The high land taxes of the 1870s, payable in cash regardless of the effects of frequent famines on farm output or productivity, combined with colonial protection of usury, money lenders, and landowner rights, contributed to widespread penury and frustration among cotton and other farmers, ultimately leading to the Deccan Riots of 1875–1877.

The colonial government enacted the Deccan Agriculturists' Relief Act in 1879, to limit the interest rate charged by money lenders to Deccan cotton farmers, but applied it selectively to areas that served foreign cotton trading interests. Rural mortality rates, in predominantly agrarian areas of colonial India, were very high between 1850 and the 1940s. However, starvation related deaths far exceeded those by suicide, the latter being officially classified under "injuries". The death rate classified under "injuries", in 1897, was 79 per 100,000 people in Central Provinces of India and 37 per 100,000 people in Bombay Presidency.

Ganapathi and Venkoba Rao analyzed suicides in parts of Tamil Nadu in 1966. They recommended that the distribution of agricultural organophosphorus compounds be restricted. Similarly, Nandi et al. in 1979 noted the role of freely available agricultural insecticides in suicides in rural West Bengal and suggested that their availability be regulated. Hegde studied rural suicides in villages of northern Karnataka over 1962 to 1970 and stated the suicide incidence rate to be 5.7 per 100,000 population. Reddy, in 1993, reviewed high rates of farmer suicides in Andhra Pradesh and its relationship to farming size and productivity.

Reporting in the popular press about farmers' suicides in India began in the mid-1990s, particularly by Palagummi Sainath. In the 2000s, the issue gained international attention and a variety of Indian government initiatives.

The National Crime Records Bureau, an office of the Ministry of Home Affairs, Government of India, which has been collecting and publishing suicide statistics for India since the 1950s (as annual Accidental Deaths & Suicides in India report) has started separately collecting and publishing farmer's suicide statistics from 1995.

== States affected ==
Maharashtra has been the state worst affected by suicides in farming sector with over 60,000 deaths between the period from 1995 to 2013.

According to the National Crime Records Bureau, the states with the highest incidence of farmer suicide in 2022 were Maharashtra (4,248), Karnataka (2,392), Andhra Pradesh (917), and Tamil Nadu (728) and Madhya Pradesh (641). Together, these five states recorded about 80 per cent of total suicides in the farming sector and about 85 per cent of farmers' suicides.

== Reasons ==
Various reasons have been offered to explain why farmers die by suicide in India, including floods, drought, debt, use of genetically modified seeds, public health, and use of lower quantity pesticides due to fewer investments producing a decreased yield. There is no consensus on what the main causes might be but studies show suicide victims are motivated by more than one cause, on average three or more causes for dying by suicide, the primary reason being the inability to repay loans. Panagariya, an economist at the World bank states, "farm-related reasons get cited only approximately 25 percent of the time as reasons for suicide" and "studies do consistently show greater debt burden and greater reliance on informal sources of credit" among farmers who die by suicide.

Reasons for farmers suicides. (in 2002)	Percent (of suicides)
Failure of crops	16.84
Other reasons (e.g. chit fund)	15.04
Family problems with spouse, others	13.27
Chronic illness	9.73
Marriage of daughters	5.31
Political affiliation	4.42
Property disputes	2.65
Debt burden	2.65
Price crash	2.65
Borrowing too much (for house construction)	2.65
Losses in non-farm activities	1.77
Failure of bore well	0.88
^{¶}Note: Reasons given by close relatives and friends. Every case cited more than one reason.

A study conducted in 2014, found that there are three specific characteristics associated with high-risk farmers: "those that grow cash crops such as coffee and cotton; those with 'marginal' farms of less than one hectare; and those with debts of 300 Rupees or more." The study also found that the Indian states in which these three characteristics are most common had the highest suicide rates and also accounted for "almost 75% of the variability in state-level suicides."

A 2012 study, did a regional survey on farmers' suicide in rural Vidarbha (Maharashtra) and applied a Smith's Saliency method to qualitatively rank the expressed causes among farming families who had lost someone to suicide. The expressed reasons in order of importance behind farmer suicides were – debt, alcohol addiction, environment, low produce prices, stress and family responsibilities, apathy, poor irrigation, increased cost of cultivation, private money lenders, use of chemical fertilizers and crop failure. In other words, debt to stress and family responsibilities were rated as significantly higher than fertilizers and crop failure. In a different study in the same region in 2006, indebtedness (87%) and deterioration in the economic status (74%) were found to be major factors for suicide.

Studies dated 2004 through 2006, identified several causes for farmers suicide, such as insufficient or risky credit systems, the difficulty of farming semi-arid regions, poor agricultural income, absence of alternative income opportunities, a downturn in the urban economy which forced non-farmers into farming, and the absence of suitable counseling services. In 2004, in response to a request from the All India Biodynamic and Organic Farming Association, the Mumbai High Court required the Tata Institute to produce a report on farmer suicides in Maharashtra, and the institute submitted its report in March 2005. The survey cited "government's lack of interest, the absence of a safety net for farmers and lack of access to information related to agriculture, as the chief causes for the desperate condition of farmers in the state."

An Indian study conducted in 2002, indicated an association between victims engaging in entrepreneurial activities (such as venturing into new crops, cash crops, and following market trends) and their failure in meeting expected goals due to a range of constraints.

=== Government economic policy ===
Economists like Utsa Patnaik, Jayati Ghosh, and Prabhat Patnaik suggest that structural changes in the macro-economic policy of the Indian Government that favored privatization, liberalization, and globalization are the root cause of farmer suicides. Business economists dispute this view.

=== GM crops ===
A number of social activist groups and studies proposed a link between expensive genetically modified crops and farmer suicides. Bt cotton (Bacillus thuringiensis cotton) was claimed to be responsible for farmer suicides. The Bt cotton seeds cost nearly twice as much as ordinary ones. The higher costs forced many farmers into taking ever larger loans, often from private moneylenders charging exorbitant interest rates (60% a year). The moneylenders force farmers to sell their cotton to them at a price lower than it fetches on the market. According to activists and studies, this created a source of debt and economic stress, ultimately suicides, among farmers. Increasing costs in farming associated with decreasing yields even with use of BT cotton seeds are often quoted cause of distress among farmers in central India. A 2015 study in Environmental Sciences Europe found that farmer suicide rates in India's rainfed areas were "directly related to increases in Bt cotton adoption." Factors leading to suicide included "high costs of BT cotton" and "ecological disruption and crop loss after the introduction of Bt cotton." Other scholars, however, say that this Bt cotton theory made certain assumptions and ignored field reality.

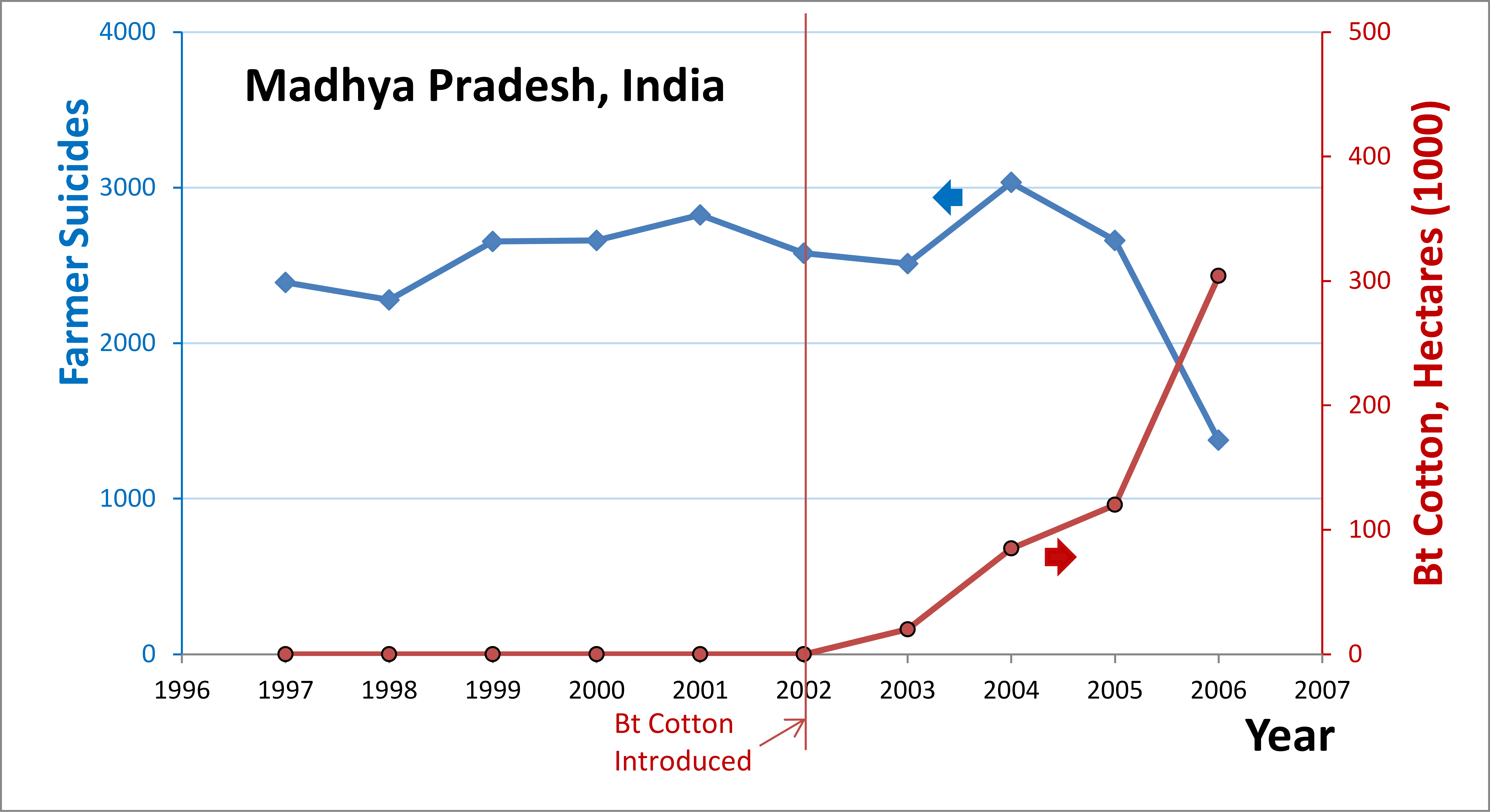
Crop coverage of bio-tech cotton (also called Bt cotton) and farmer suicides over time in Madhya Pradesh India, before and after the introduction of Bt cotton in 2002

In 2008, a report published by the International Food Policy Research Institute, an agriculture policy think tank formed to promote the adoption of innovations in agricultural technology, based in Washington, D.C., noted that there was an absence of data relating to "numbers on the actual share of farmers committing suicide who cultivated cotton, let alone Bt cotton." In order to evaluate the "possible (and hypothetical)" existence of a connection the study employed a "second-best" assessment of evidence relating to farmer suicides firstly, and to the effects of Bt cotton secondly. The analysis revealed that there was no "clear general relationship between Bt cotton and farmer suicides" but also stated that it could not reject the "potential role of Bt cotton varieties in the observed discrete increase in farmer suicides in certain states and years, especially during the peak of 2004 in Andhra Pradesh and Maharashtra." The report also noted that farmer suicides predate the official commercial introduction of Bt cotton by Monsanto Mahyco in 2002 (and its unofficial introduction by Navbharat Seeds in 2001) and that such suicides were a fairly constant portion of the overall national suicide rate since 1997. The report noted that while Bt cotton may have been a factor in specific suicides, the contribution was likely marginal compared to socio-economic factors. Elsewhere, Gruere et al. discuss the introduction and increase in use of Bt cotton in the state of Madhya Pradesh since 2002, and the observed drop in total suicides among that state's farmers in 2006. They then question whether the impact of the increase in use of Bt cotton on farmers suicide in Madhya Pradesh has been to improve or worsen the situation.

In 2011, a review of the evidence regarding the relationship between Bt cotton and farmers' suicides in India was published in the Journal of Development Studies, also by researchers from IFPRI, which found that "Available data show no evidence of a 'resurgence' of farmer suicides. Moreover, Bt cotton technology has been very effective overall in India." Matin Qaim finds that Bt cotton is controversial in India, irrespective of the scholarly evidence. Anti-biotech activist groups in India repeat their claim that there is evidence of a link between Bt cotton and farmer's suicides, a claim that is perpetuated by mass media. This linking of farmer's suicide and the biotech industry has led to negative opinions in the public policy-making process.

Stone suggests that the arrival and expansion of GM cotton led to a campaign of misinformation, by all sides, exacerbating the farmer's situation; activists have fuelled the persistence of a legend of failure and rejection of Bt cotton with sensational claims of livestock death and farmer suicide, while the other side has been incorrectly pronouncing Bt cotton a major success based on literature that is actually inconclusive. The cotton cash crop farmer's situation is complex and continues to evolve, suggests Stone. Gilbert, in a 2013 article published in Nature, states, "contrary to popular myth, the introduction in 2002 of genetically modified Bt cotton is not associated with a rise in suicide rates among Indian farmers".

In another 2014 review, Ian Plewis states, "the available data does not support the view that farmer suicides have increased following the introduction of Bt cotton. Taking all states together, there is evidence to support the hypothesis that the reverse is true: male farmer suicide rates have actually declined after 2005 having been increasing before then".

=== Misdirection of government subsidies and funds ===
As per reports by the central government and NCRB, government farming subsidies from 1993 to 2018 mostly went to producers and dealers of seeds and fertilizers, and not to farmers. In 2017, Rs. 35,000 crores of loans and subsidies were given to entities in the cities of New Delhi and Chandigarh, cities that do not have any farmers. Similarly, in Maharashtra, 60% of government loans and subsidies were given to people and entities residing in Mumbai. This has resulted in money being circulated between the government, banks large and small corporations, and politicians, without any of it reaching farmers, aggravating their woes. Most farmer loans were less than Rs. 50,000.

=== Deadly drought ===
Due to poor artificial irrigation facilities, as much as 79.5% of India's farmland relies on flooding during monsoon season, so inadequate rainfall can cause droughts, making crop failure more common. Climate change has increased the frequency and coverage of droughts in India. According to UN Convention to Combat Desertification, in 2020-2022, nearly two-thirds of India was drought-prone. In regions that have experienced droughts, crop yields have declined and food for cattle has become scarcer, subsequently increasing their suicide rates.

=== Suicide idea ===
Economist Patel found that southern Indian states have ten times higher rates of suicides than some northern states. This difference, they say, is not because of misclassification of a person's death. The most common cause of suicide in South India is a combination of social issues, such as interpersonal and family problems, financial difficulties, and pre-existing mental illness. Suicidal ideation is as culturally accepted in south India as in some high-income countries. The high suicide rates in southern states of India may be, suggest Patel el al., in part because of social acceptance of suicide as a method to deal with difficulties. Suicide ideation among surviving family members of farmers' suicide victims is another worry. A recent study shows that almost a third of suicide survivors (family members left behind) had suicide ideation in one month prior to assessment.

=== Debt ===
Many of the suicides by Indian farmers have been linked to the large amounts of debt and interest that many of these individuals accumulate. According to a 2006 study by P. Sainath, the percentage of farmers who were in debt in Andhra Pradesh, Punjab, Karnataka, and Maharashtra was 70%, 65%, 61%, and 60%, respectively.

=== Maharashtra's government field surveys ===
The Government of Maharashtra, concerned about the highest total number of farmer suicides among its rural populations, commissioned its own study into reasons. At its behest, Indira Gandhi Institute of Development Research in Mumbai did field research and found the top causes of farmers suicides to be: debt, low income, and crop failure, family issues such as illness and inability to pay celebration expenses for daughter's marriage, lack of secondary income occupations and lack of value-added opportunities.

== Statistics of farmer suicide ==
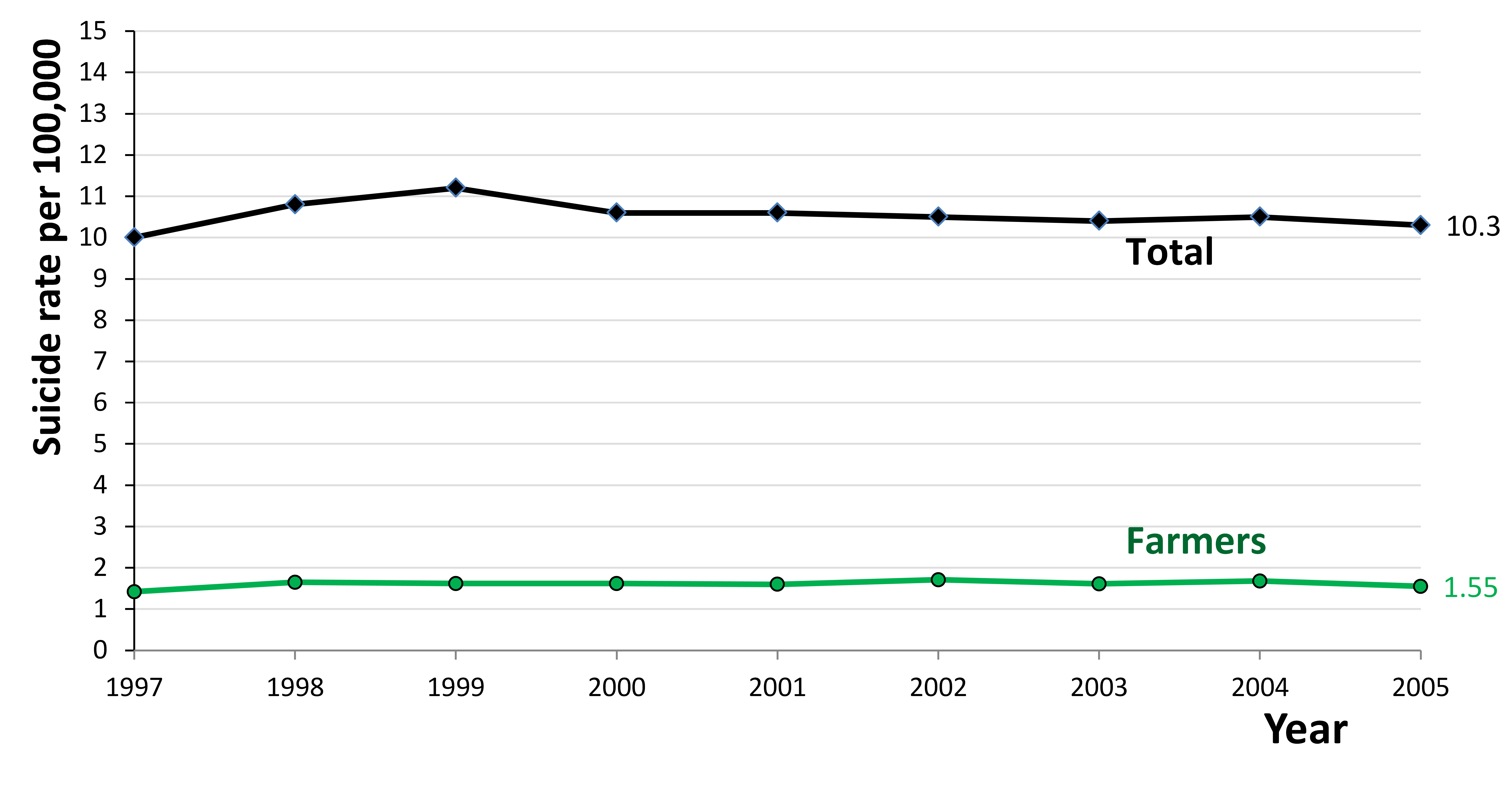
Farmers and total suicide rates per 100,000 people in India

The National Crime Records Bureau of India reported in its 2012 annual report, that 135,445 people died by suicide in India, of which 13,755 were farmers (11.2%). Of these, 5 out of 29 states accounted for 10,486 farmers suicides (76%) – Maharashtra, Andhra Pradesh, Karnataka, Madhya Pradesh and Kerala.

In 2011, a total of 135,585 people died by suicide, of which 14,027 were farmers. In 2010, 15,963 farmers in India died by suicide, while total suicides were 134,599. From 1995 to 2013, a total of 296,438 Indian farmers died by suicide. During the same period, about 9.5 million people died per year in India from other causes including malnutrition, diseases and suicides that were non-farming related, or about 171 million deaths from 1995 to 2013.

In 2012, the state of Maharashtra, with 3,786 farmers' suicides, accounted for about a quarter of the all India's farmer suicides total (13,754). From 2009 to 2016, a total of 25,613 farmers died by suicide in the state.

Farmer suicides rates in Bihar and Uttar Pradesh – two large states of India by size and population – have been about 10 times lower than Maharashtra, Kerala and Pondicherry. In 2012, there were 745 farmer suicides in Uttar Pradesh, a state with an estimated population of 205.43 million. In 2014, there were eight farmer suicides in Uttar Pradesh.

According to an IFPRI study, the number of suicides from 2005 to 2009 were 387, 905, 75, and 26, in Gujarat, Kerala, Punjab, and Tamil Nadu, respectively. While 1802 farmers died by suicide in Chhattisgarh in 2009 and 1126 in 2010, its farmers suicide dropped to zero in 2011, leading to accusations of data manipulation.

According to the 2012 statistics, from the National Crime Records Bureau, the farmer suicides statistics are as follows (Note: The NCRB lists suicides in the different employment categories, but it is not necessary that farming or crop-failure is the cause of the suicides listed in the "farmer" category):

As per National Crime Records Bureau, the number of suicides by farmers and farm labourers increased to 12,360 in 2014, against 11,772 in 2013. Of these suicides, 5,650 were farmers suicides.

As of 2018, the Indian government has not published data on farmer suicides since 2015. National Crime Records Bureau director Ish Kumar said that the data is under scrutiny and the report for 2016 is likely to be published later.

Farmer suicides in the Indian states (2012)

Farmer suicides in the Indian states (2012)
State	Total farmer suicides (Not normalised for different populations of different states)
Maharashtra	3,786
Andhra Pradesh	2,572
Karnataka	1,875
Madhya Pradesh	1,172
Kerala	1,081
Uttar Pradesh	745
Gujarat	564
Tamil Nadu	499
Assam	344
Haryana	276
Rajasthan	270
Odisha	146
Jharkhand	119
Punjab	75
Bihar	68
Himachal Pradesh	29
Sikkim	19
Tripura	18
Uttarakhand	14
Arunachal Pradesh	11
Meghalaya	10
Mizoram	10
Jammu & Kashmir	10
Chhattisgarh	4
Goa	1
Manipur	0

Farmer suicides rate per 100,000 people in the state (2012)

Farmer suicides rate per 100,000 people in the state (2012)
State	Farmer suicides rate per 100,000 people (Top 25 states)
Maharashtra	3.3
Karnataka	3.12
Kerala	3.09
Sikkim	3.05
Andhra Pradesh	3.0
West Bengal	5.02
Madhya Pradesh	1.59
INDIA AVERAGE	1.36
Assam	1.11
Haryana	1.06
Mizoram	0.98
Gujarat	0.94
Arunachal Pradesh	0.87
Tamil Nadu	0.73
Tripura	0.49
Himachal Pradesh	0.42
Rajasthan	0.39
Nagaland	0.39
Meghalaya	0.38
Uttar Pradesh	0.37
Jharkhand	0.37
Odisha	0.35
Punjab	0.27
Uttarakhand	0.14
Jammu & Kashmir	0.1
Bihar	.072
Goa	0.1
Chhattisgarh	0.02
Manipur	0.00

Farmer suicides as a % of total suicides in the state (2012)

Farmer suicides as a % of total suicides in the state (2012)
State	Farmer suicides as a % of total suicides
Maharashtra	23.50
Andhra Pradesh	18.10
Uttar Pradesh	16.80
Karnataka	14.70
Kerala	12.70
Madhya Pradesh	12.00
Assam	10.50
Sikkim	10.50
Haryana	9.80
Jharkhand	9.00
Bihar	9.00
Arunachal Pradesh	8.50
Gujarat	7.90
Meghalaya	7.80
Punjab	7.30
Mizoram	5.80
Rajasthan	5.60
Himachal Pradesh	5.50
Uttarakhand	3.30
Tamil Nadu	2.90
Odisha	2.90
Jammu & Kashmir	2.40
Tripura	2.10
Goa	0.30
Chhattisgarh	0.10
Manipur	0.00

All India figures for Farmer suicides from 1995 to 2022

All India figures for Farmer suicides as per NCRB
Year	Total farmer suicides (Not normalised for different populations of different states)
1995	10,720
1996	13,729
1997	13,622
1998	16,015
1999	16,082
2000	16,603
2001	16,415
2002	17,971
2003	17,164
2004	18,241
2005	17,131
2006	17,060
2007	16,632
2008	16,796
2009	17,368
2010	15,964
2011	14,027
2012	13,754
2013	11,772
2014	12,360
2015	12,602
2016	11,379
2017	10,655
2018	10,349
2019	10,281
2020	10,677
2021	10,881
2022	11,290

=== Farmers versus other professions ===
Patel et al., using a representative survey sample-based statistical study from 2001 and 2003, extrapolated likely suicide patterns in 2010 for India. They say suicide deaths in India among unemployed individuals and individuals in professions other than agricultural work were, collectively, about three times more frequent than they were in agricultural labourers and landowning cultivators. Even across professions in rural areas, Patel et al. find suicide among agricultural workers (including farmers) in India is not more frequent than any other profession.

The suicide incidence rate in India, on a 100,000 farmers basis, is unclear. All estimates are speculative because the actual total number of farmers by state or India in each year is not available. Farm suicides per 100,000 farmers can be reliably calculated for 2001 because accurate data on the number of farmers in the country and states are available for 2001 from the Census of India. The farm suicide rate was 12.9 suicides per 100,000 farmers, which was higher than the general suicide rate at 10.6 for 2001 in India. By gender, the suicide rate was 16.2 male farmer suicides per 100,000 male farmers compared to 12.5 male suicides per 100,000 for the general population. Among women, the suicide rate was 6.2 female farmer suicides per 100,000 female farmers compared to 8.5 female suicides per 100,000 for the general population.

=== Total number of farmers ===
Annual farmers' suicide incidence rate data on a 100,000 farmers basis, depending on the estimated total number of farmers for that year. Estimates for the total number of farmers in India vary widely. Some count the total number of cultivators, some include cultivators and agricultural laborers in their definition of total farmers, while others include anyone engaged in any form of farming and agriculture activity. Estimates for a total number of farmers in India, for 2011, accordingly range from 95.8 million (8%) to 263 million (22%) to 450 million (38%), out of a total population of over 1.2 billion. Others estimate the total number of farmers in India to be about 600 million (50% of the total population). With about 14,000 suicides in 2011 by those engaged in farming and agricultural activities, the different estimates of total farmers has led to different suicide incidence rate estimates on per 100,000 farmers basis. Additionally, the reliability of official statistics has been questioned. K. Nagaraj suggests that official data may be overestimating the number of total farmers in India, and undercounting the total number of farmer suicides every year. Tom Brass, in contrast, suggests that official census and surveys in India systematically underestimate the total number of people engaged in agriculture in India.

== Responses to farmers' suicides ==
The government appointed several inquiries to look into the causes of farmers' suicide and farm-related distress in general. Krishak Ayog (National Farmer Commission) visited all suicide-prone farming regions of India, then in 2006 published three reports with its recommendations. Subsequently, former prime minister Manmohan Singh visited Vidarbha in 2006 and promised a package of ₹110 billion (about $2.4 billion). The families of farmers who had died by suicide were also offered an ex gratia grant of ₹100,000 (US$1,100) by the government, though this amount was changed several times.

=== 2006 relief package ===
In 2006, the Government of India identified 31 districts in the four states of Andhra Pradesh, Maharashtra, Karnataka, and Kerala with a high relative incidence of farmer suicides. A special rehabilitation package was launched to mitigate the distress of these farmers. The package provided debt relief to farmers, improved the supply of institutional credit, improved irrigation facilities, employed experts and social service personnel to provide farming support services, and introduced subsidiary income opportunities through horticulture, livestock, dairy, and fisheries. The Government of India also announced ex-gratia cash assistance from Prime Ministers National Relief Fund to the farmers. Additionally, among other things, the Government of India announced:

- In the Vidarbha region of Maharashtra, which had received considerable mass media news coverage on farmer suicides, all farmer families of Vidarbha in six affected districts of Maharashtra were given a cash sum of ₹05 million (US$53,000) each, to help pay off the debt principal.
- ₹7.12 billion (US$76 million) in interest owed, as of 30 June 2006, was waived. The burden of payment was shared equally between the Central and the State government.
- The Government created a special credit vehicle for Vidarbha farmers, to the tune of ₹12.75 billion (US$140 million). Special teams comprising NABARD and banks were deputed to ensure fresh credit starts flowing to all farmers of the region.
- An allocation of ₹21.77 billion (US$230 million) was made to improve the irrigation infrastructure so that the farmers of the Vidarbha region had assured irrigation facilities in the future.

=== Agricultural debt waiver and debt relief scheme, 2008 ===
The Government of India next implemented the Agricultural debt Waiver and Debt Relief Scheme in 2008 to benefit over 36 million farmers at a cost of ₹653 billion (US$7.0 billion). This spending was aimed at the writing part of the loan principal as well as the interest owed by the farmers. Direct agricultural loan by stressed farmers under the so-called Kisan Credit Card was also to be covered under this Scheme.

=== Regional initiatives ===
Various state governments in India have launched their own initiatives to help prevent farmer suicides. The government of Maharashtra set up a dedicated group to deal with farm distress in 2006 known as the Vasantrao Naik Sheti Swavlamban Mission, based in Amravati. A group to study the Farmers Suicides was also constituted by the Government of Karnataka under the chairmanship of Dr. Veeresh, former vice-chancellor of Agricultural University and Prof Deshpande as a member.

==== Maharashtra Bill to regulate farmer loan terms, 2008 ====
The State government of Maharashtra, one of the most farmer suicide-affected states, passed the Money Lending (Regulation) Act, 2008 to regulate all private money lending to farmers. The bill set maximum not legally allowed interest rates on any loans to farmers, setting it to be slightly above the money lending rate by Reserve Bank of India, and it also covered pending loans.

==== Maharashtra Relief Package, 2010 ====
The State Government of Maharashtra made it illegal, in 2010, for non-licensed moneylenders from seeking loan repayment. The State Government also announced that it will form Village Farmer Self Help Groups to disburse government-financed loans, a low rate Crop Insurance program whose premium will be paid 50% by the farmer and 50% by the government, and the launch of alternate income opportunities such as poultry, dairy, and sericulture for farmers in suicide-prone districts. The government further announced that it will finance a marriage fund under its Samudaik Lagna with ₹10 million (US$110,000) per year per district, for community marriage celebrations, where many couples get married at the same time to help minimize the cost of marriage celebrations – a cause of suicides among farmers as identified by its own study.

==== Kerala Farmers' Debt Relief Commission (Amendment) Bill, 2012 ====
Kerala, in 2012, amended the Kerala Farmers' Debt Relief Commission Act, 2006 to extend benefits to all distressed farmers with loans through 2011. It cited continuing farmer suicides as a motivation.

=== 2013 diversify income sources package ===
In 2013, the Government of India launched a Special Livestock Sector and Fisheries Package for farmers in suicide-prone regions of Andhra Pradesh, Maharashtra, Karnataka, and Kerala. The package was aimed to diversify the income sources of farmers. The total welfare package consisted of ₹912 million (US$9.7 million).

=== Effectiveness of government response ===
The government's response and relief packages have generally been ineffective, misdirected, and flawed, states Surinder Sud. It has focused on credit and loan, rather than income, productivity, and farmer prosperity. Due to Anti Farmer laws, there is no scope for farmers to do the business or sell or lease farm or farm products. Assistance in paying off outstanding principal and interest helps the money lenders but has failed to create reliable and good sources of income for the farmer going forward. The usurious moneylenders continue to offer loans at interest rates between 24 and 50 percent, while the income-generating potential of the land the farmer works on has remained low and subject to weather conditions. Sud states that the government has failed to understand that debt relief just postpones the problem and a more lasting answer to farmer distress can only come from reliable income sources, higher crop yields per hectare, irrigation and other infrastructure security. Golait, in a Reserve Bank of India paper, acknowledged the positive role of crop diversification initiative announced in government's response to reports of farmer suicides. Golait added, "Indian agriculture still suffers from: i) poor productivity, ii) falling water levels, iii) expensive credit, iv) a distorted market, v) many middlemen and intermediaries who increase cost but do not add much value, vi) laws that stifle private investment, vii) controlled prices, viii) poor infrastructure and ix) inappropriate research. Thus the approach with a mere emphasis on credit in isolation from the above factors will not help agriculture". Furthermore, recommended Golait, a more pro-active role in creating and maintaining reliable irrigation and other agriculture infrastructure is necessary to address farmer distress in India.

== Punjabi Farmers' Suicides in India ==
The economy of Punjab is primarily driven by agriculture. Punjab accounts for about 3% of India's farmable land, and it grows approximately 20% of India's wheat and 12% of the nation's rice. There has been a rise in Punjabi farmers' suicides mainly due to increasing debt, difficulties in paying back loans, rising costs, and low profits, which are exacerbated by other factors.

Map of Punjab.

The average farmer household in Punjab earned approximately Rs 320,412 a year, but took out Rs 343,000 in loans in 2020. Punjab's agriculture industry is becoming less profitable due to rising costs in land rent, diesel, and fertilizers. They have also incurred losses due to their main crops, cotton and wheat being damaged by pests, high temperatures, pesticide overuse, soil infertility, and groundwater depletion.

According to The Union Agriculture Minister, Narendra Tomar, a total of 1,056 farmers died by suicide from 2017 to 2021 in Punjab. Punjabi farmers' suicides have increased in frequency since 2015. Between 2000 and 2014, there had been about 70 suicides a year. After 2015, that number quadrupled to 263 suicides a year. Most of these farmers dying by suicide are young to middle-aged men. The average median age of suicide was 33 and 39 years for agricultural and other workers, respectively.

=== Loans and debt ===
Debt is being passed down from one deceased son to the next, leading to multiple suicides in one family. Children in these families have to be pulled out of school because their families cannot afford to educate them. Smaller farmers are the first to suffer. With rising production costs, they must take on debts they cannot repay.

In a 2020 survey conducted by Arcus Policy Research Private Limited in Punjab, Uttar Pradesh, and Maharashtra, 3,000 farmers were surveyed on the topic of loans. Punjabi farmers were found to take out the highest amount of loans. On average, a farmer in Punjab took out loans of Rs 343,000, while in Maharashtra, a farmer took out Rs 61,000 in loans, and in UP, a farmer took out Rs 84,000.

Interest rates ranged from 5.96% to 7.72% for institutional loans and 10% to 21% for non-institutional loans for farmers in all three states. Interest was highest for loans taken out by Punjabi farmers. For them, interest was 7.35% to 7.72% for institutional loans and 17% to 21% for non-institutional loans.

The survey also showed that farmers diverted a portion of their farming loans to non-farming needs. In Punjab, 41% of farming loan amounts were diverted towards family care expenses. In Maharashtra, 26% was diverted towards family care and in UP it was only 13%.

This higher need for borrowing is due to the higher cost of cultivation in Punjab. According to data from 2018–19 from the Directorate of Economics and Statistics, Ministry of Agriculture, producing a quintal of maize costs Rs 1,200 in the state of Bihar, Rs 1,485 in the state of Karnataka, and Rs 1,800 in Punjab. For mustard, the state of Rajasthan produces a quintal for Rs 2,700, the state of Madhya Pradesh produces it for Rs 2,600, and Punjab requires Rs 3,550.

=== Green Revolution ===
Punjab and much of Asia experienced what is referred to as the Green Revolution in the 1960s and 1970s. It was led by politicians, scientists, and philanthropists in the U.S. and other countries, driven by humanitarianism and Cold War politics. They believed that they could mitigate hunger and prevent the spread of communism by making farmers in developing countries like India switch from traditional methods of farming to the Western method with pesticides, fertilizers, and high-yield seeds.

The Green Revolution in Punjab started in the 1960s when high-yielding varieties of wheat and rice started being used to fight hunger and poverty. Wheat and rice production doubled from government initiatives, while production of crops like millet and indigenous rice varieties decreased. Then, Punjab experienced a loss of indigenous crops from cultivation, causing extinction and a sharp decline in biodiversity.

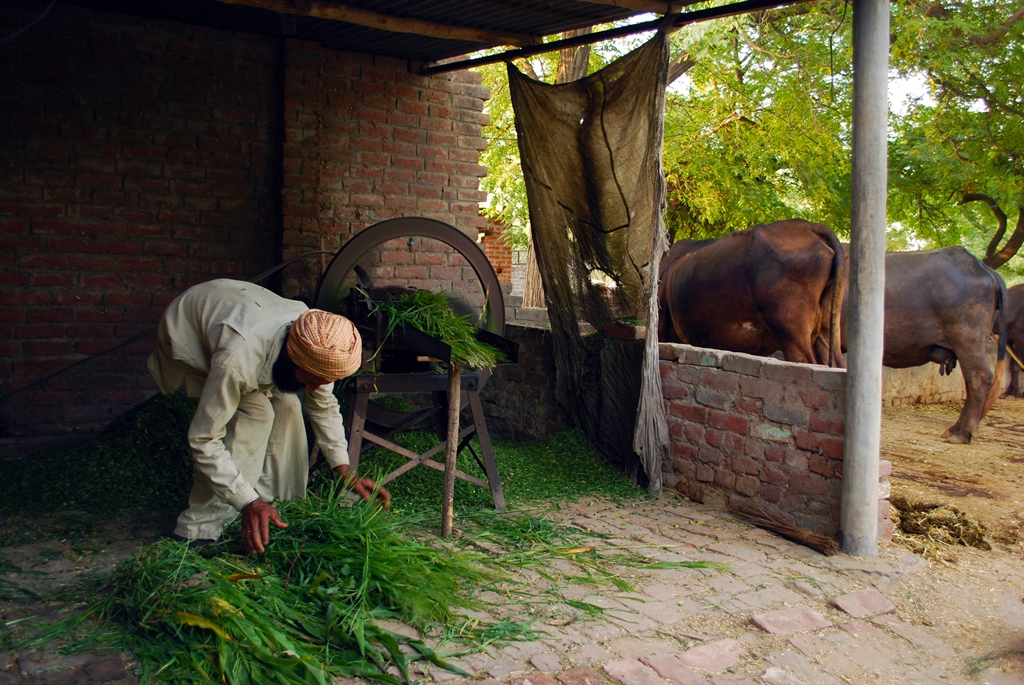
Punjabi farmer preparing cattle feed.

Researchers at Punjab's School of Public Health found that farming villages using large amounts of pesticides have an increase in cancer rates than villages using less pesticides. Some farmers in Punjab say they spray their crops 10 or more times each season even though the pesticide labels suggest once or twice. Many of these farmers have also said they do not wear protective clothing.

Through the overuse of pesticides, new generations of pesticide-resistant pests have developed. These superpests like the pink bollworm have led to crop failures of mainly cotton and wheat in Punjab. Overuse of chemical fertilizers and decreased use of organic manure for soil fertilization has led to reduced carbon, nitrogen, phosphorus, iron, and manganese in soil, resulting in lower soil quality overall. Profits decreased due to input costs such as chemical fertilizers, pesticides, and herbicides, all of which were introduced with the Green Revolution in an effort to maximize crop yield. As a result, the effects of soil infertility and groundwater depletion have added to the Punjabi farmers' debt burden due to increased expenditure on cultivation to overcome these problems.

=== Water crisis ===
Annual rice/wheat cropping is associated with the use of large amounts of electricity needed to pump declining groundwater. Specifically, rice is a crop that requires great amounts of water. Farmers drill deeper into the ground where they tap older aquifers that can take several years to recharge with groundwater. As the Green Revolution initiative calls for higher yields and production of staple crops, electricity consumption by farmers has increased over the years as more energy is required to pump water from deeper depths.

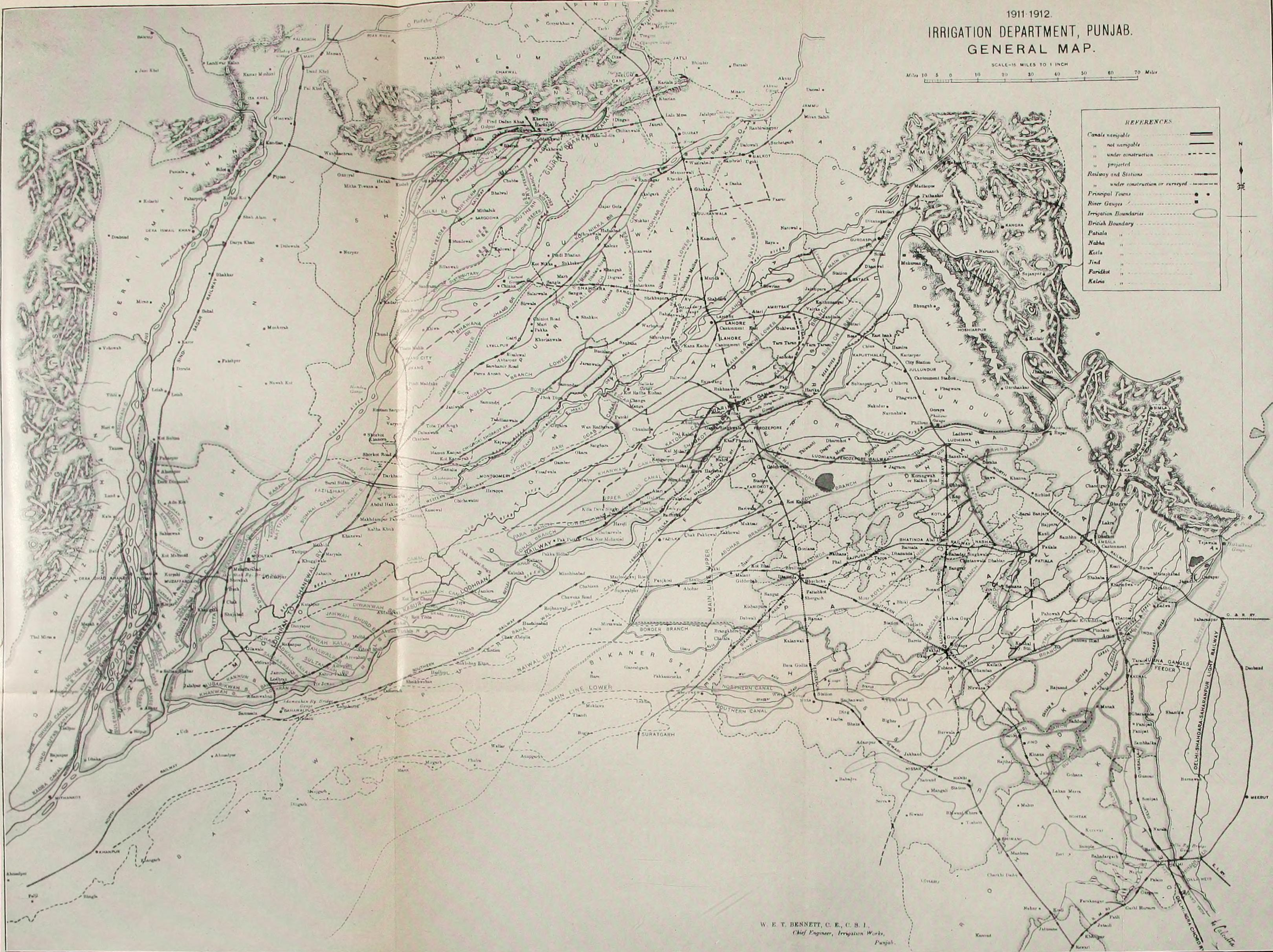
An irrigation map of Punjab from 1911.

Water tables have been declining rapidly due to excessive groundwater tapping for farming. 79% of groundwater blocks in Punjab are classified as overexploited with extraction surpassing supply. The water table in Punjab was declining at an average of 18 cm per year from 1982-1987. From 1997-2002, the rate of decline was 42 cm per year. The rate of decline then increased to 75 cm from 2002-2006.

The effects of groundwater depletion include drying of wells, decreased stream flows, poor water quality, sinking land, increased costs, and lower profits for farmers in Punjab, contributing to the suicide crisis.

=== 2020 Farmer bills ===
In September 2020, the Central Government enacted three agricultural bills into law. These laws were:

1. The Farmers' Produce Trade and Commerce (Promotion and Facilitation) Act
  - allows farmers to sell produce outside of government-protected markets known as Agriculture Produce Market Committees (APMC) to new, private markets.
2. The Farmers (Empowerment and Protection) Agreement of Price Assurance and Farm Services Act
  - allows farmers to engage in contract farming and market their produce without government regulation.
3. The Essential Commodities (Amendment) Act
  - the government can no longer regulate supply of essential food items, like grains, oils, etc., giving private corporations more freedom in the buying, selling, and storage of produce.

These three bills aimed to bring significant changes to the agricultural framework in Punjab and across India. However, they were enacted without consultation with farmers' unions. Supporters viewed the legislation as a means to empower farmers by allowing them to set their own prices, foster competition, and sell directly to private corporations for potentially higher profits. Critics, on the other hand, feared that the reforms would enable corporate giants to exploit farmers by reducing market competition, driving down prices, and ultimately diminishing farmers' earnings.

Previously, farmers had to sell their goods at auction at the government agreed minimum support price (MSP) for each crop. The MSP serves as a minimum wage or a safety net for farmers. The original rules surrounding the sale, pricing, and storage of produce protected farmers from an unrestricted free market for decades. The new bills loosened the rules of the sale, pricing, and storage of produce with the goal of deregulation, giving power to private corporations. The farmers said that with the new bills, market forces could push prices even lower. Struggling farmers would see even lower profit margins as they could find it difficult to negotiate favorable deals with corporations.

=== Farmer protests ===
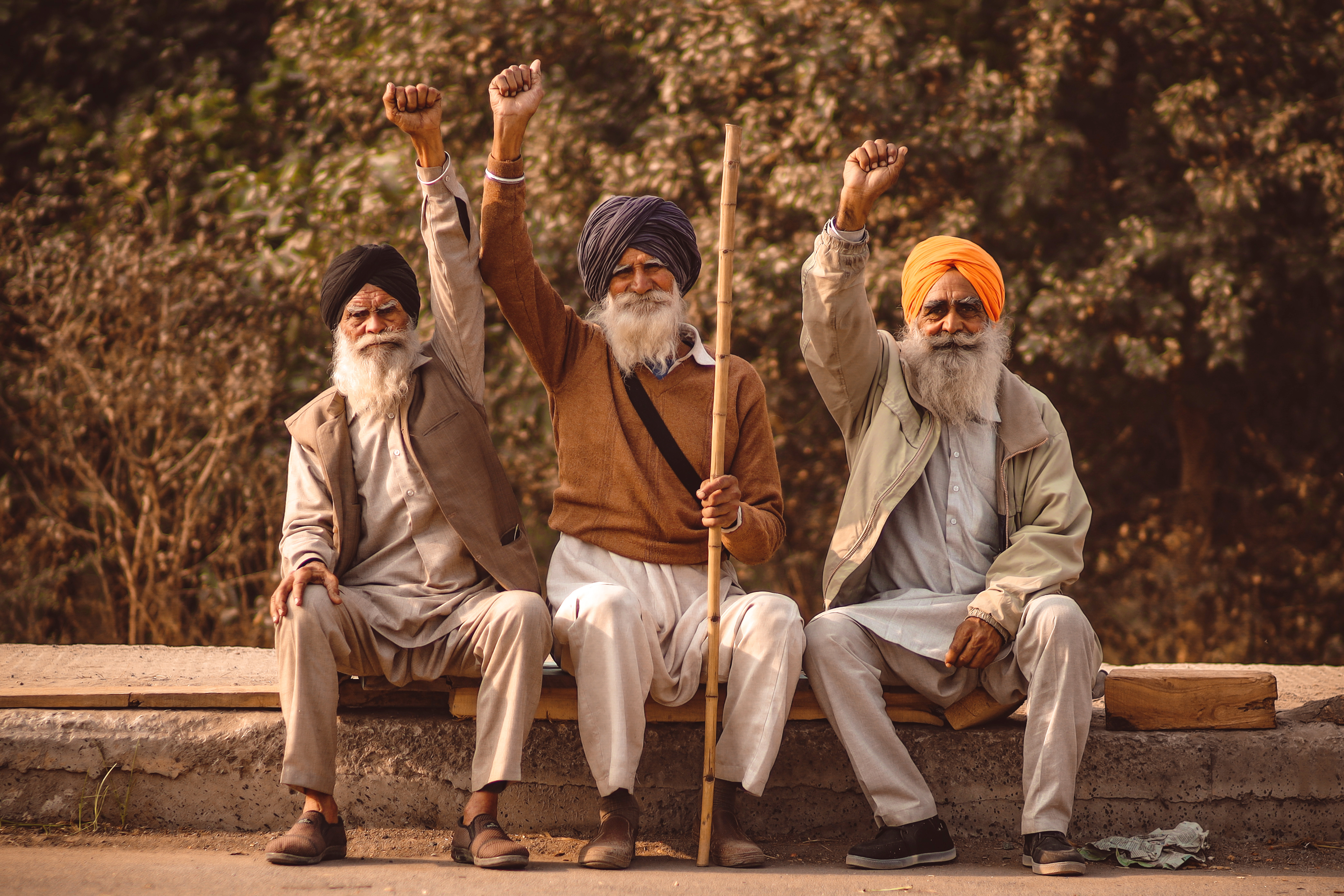
Three protesters during the India Farmer Protests.

In response to the three new farming laws, farmers began protesting in September 2020. The protests began in New Delhi, the capital of India and quickly spread to many of India's major cities. A majority of these protesters were Punjabi Sikhs. Protesters blocked railway tracks and highways with their trucks and tractors. Protesters also set up encampments in the Singhu area outside of New Delhi. Farmers wanted these laws to be repealed as they believed it would be damaging to their livelihoods. Farm organizations began calling for country-wide farmer strikes after the government was unwilling to repeal these laws. Protests even occurred at the Indian Embassy in London, gaining worldwide attention.

After pushback against these laws, India's Supreme Court paused the implementation of the new farming laws on January 12, 2021 for an indefinite period. Protests continued for many months after until November 19, 2021, almost a year later, when Prime Minister Narendra Modi repealed all three farming laws.

=== Mental health stigma ===
There is a stigma that exists around mental health in rural Punjab that has a contributing factor towards farmer suicides. Suicide is illegal in India, threatening prison time for anyone who attempts or has assisted with suicide. This policy originated in British colonial rule and makes it difficult to gather accurate data on farmer suicides. Because of this law, it is said that the number of farmer suicides is underreported. Poor families are more reluctant to report suicide to authorities because the state does not provide families the support they need, especially in impoverished areas of rural Punjab. Instead, authorities will open lengthy investigations into the family members of the victim to make sure the suicide was not merely a cover-up or if someone else had assisted.

== International comparison ==
Farmer's suicide is a global phenomenon. Outside India, studies in Sri Lanka, the United States, Canada, and Australia have identified farming as a high-stress profession that is associated with a higher suicide rate than the general population. This is particularly true among small-scale farmers and after periods of economic distress. Fraser et al., similarly, after a review of 52 scholarly publications, conclude that farming populations in the United Kingdom, Europe, Australia, Canada, and the United States have the highest rates of suicide of any industry and there is growing evidence that those involved in farming are at higher risk of developing mental health problems. Their review claims a wide range of reasons behind farmers suicide globally including mental health issues, physical environment, family problems, economic stress, and uncertainties. Significantly higher suicide rate among farmers than the general population has been reported in developed countries such as the UK and the US.

== In popular culture ==
One of the most acclaimed works is Nero's Guests, a first-person documentary that follows the journey of P. Sainath, Rural Affairs Editor at The Hindu, as he reports on the alarming cases of farmer suicides in the Vidarbha and Marathwada regions of Maharashtra. His investigative reporting drew immediate attention from the government, prompting a visit to the affected areas by the Prime Minister.

The 2008 film Summer 2007 by producer Atul Pandey, focused on the issue of farmer suicides in Maharashtra's Vidarbha region, as did the 2010s Bollywood films Kissan and Peepli Live, Jawan (2023) and the 2014 Tamil film Kaththi. Prior to this The Dying Fields, a documentary directed by Fred de Sam Lazaro was aired in August 2007 on Wide Angle (TV series). The 2010 award-winning film Jhing Chik Jhing is based around the emotive issue of farmer suicides in Maharashtra. It looks at how the farmer has very little in his control and looks at the impact of indebtedness on his family. Mitti: Back to the Roots, a movie by Anshul Sinha released in 2018 showcased the agrarian crisis and its possible solutions.

In 2009, the International Museum of Women included an examination of the impact of farmers' suicides on the lives of the farmers' wives and children in their exhibition Economica: Women and the Global Economy. Their slideshow "Growing Debt" and accompanying essay by curator Masum Momaya entitled "Money of Her Own" showed how many widows were left with the burden of their husbands' debts, and were forced to work as indentured servants to repay the debt. The widows were also unlikely to remarry because other men in the community were unwilling to take on the widows' debts for themselves.

== See also ==
- Agricultural insurance in India
- Debt bondage in India
- Farmers' suicides in Canada
- Farmers' suicides in the United States
- Farmers' suicides in western Odisha
- Navdanya
- Suicide in India
- Health effects of pesticides
- Pesticide poisoning
- List of countries by employment in agriculture
- 2017 Tamil Nadu farmers' protest
- 2020–2021 Indian farmers' protest
