= Farmers' suicides in western Odisha =

In the 21st century, suicides by farmers in Western Odisha, India have been an ongoing problem.

== Background ==
Historically, Western Odisha had abundant natural resources and a self-sufficient economy. Flooding was an uncommon occurrence in the region, while droughts were frequent.

The Hirakud Dam (completed 1955) and other dam projects were built by the government primarily to decrease the damage by flooding in Coastal Odisha and to facilitate irrigation in the western region. As these dams were built, many villages in the region were displaced. Moreover, the displaced people, mainly farmers, were not given compensation for damages. The displaced people migrated to other places, including Jharsuguda, Sambalpur, Bargarh, Sonepur, Angul, and the Boudh district. There, they bought land and lived on low incomes generated from their small land holdings. Irrigation and rain saved these people from facing severe sustained drought.

Forest coverage of the catchment area of Hirakud Dam, which lies mostly in Chhattisgarh, has declined drastically. Most of the perennial water sources and streams come from the bauxite-rich mountains due to the water affinity of the mineral. As bauxite and iron ores are extracted, the water-holding capacity of the mountains have declined, causing siltation and flash floods during rain and drought during summer. These conditions have been worsened by unsustainable industrialization and its use of water resources, high level of pollution, and indiscriminate deforestation.

== Investigations ==
It is reported that more than 60 farmers in Western Odisha have committed suicide. It is also reported that forty-three farmers killed themselves towards the end of 2009. Some of the reasons for farmer suicide are: all of them were small farmers, entirely dependent on monsoons for irrigation, sudden Inflation had limited their access to expensive fertilizers and pesticides and all of them had borrowed from moneylenders between Rs 10,000 to 25,000 at exorbitant rates, some as high as 25 per cent.

The Biju Janata Dal and Bharatiya Janata Party have sent teams to the region to investigate the causes and effects of farmer suicides.

== See also ==
- Farmers' suicides in Canada
- Farmers' suicides in India
- Farmers' suicides in the United States
