= Mental health in United States agricultural workers =

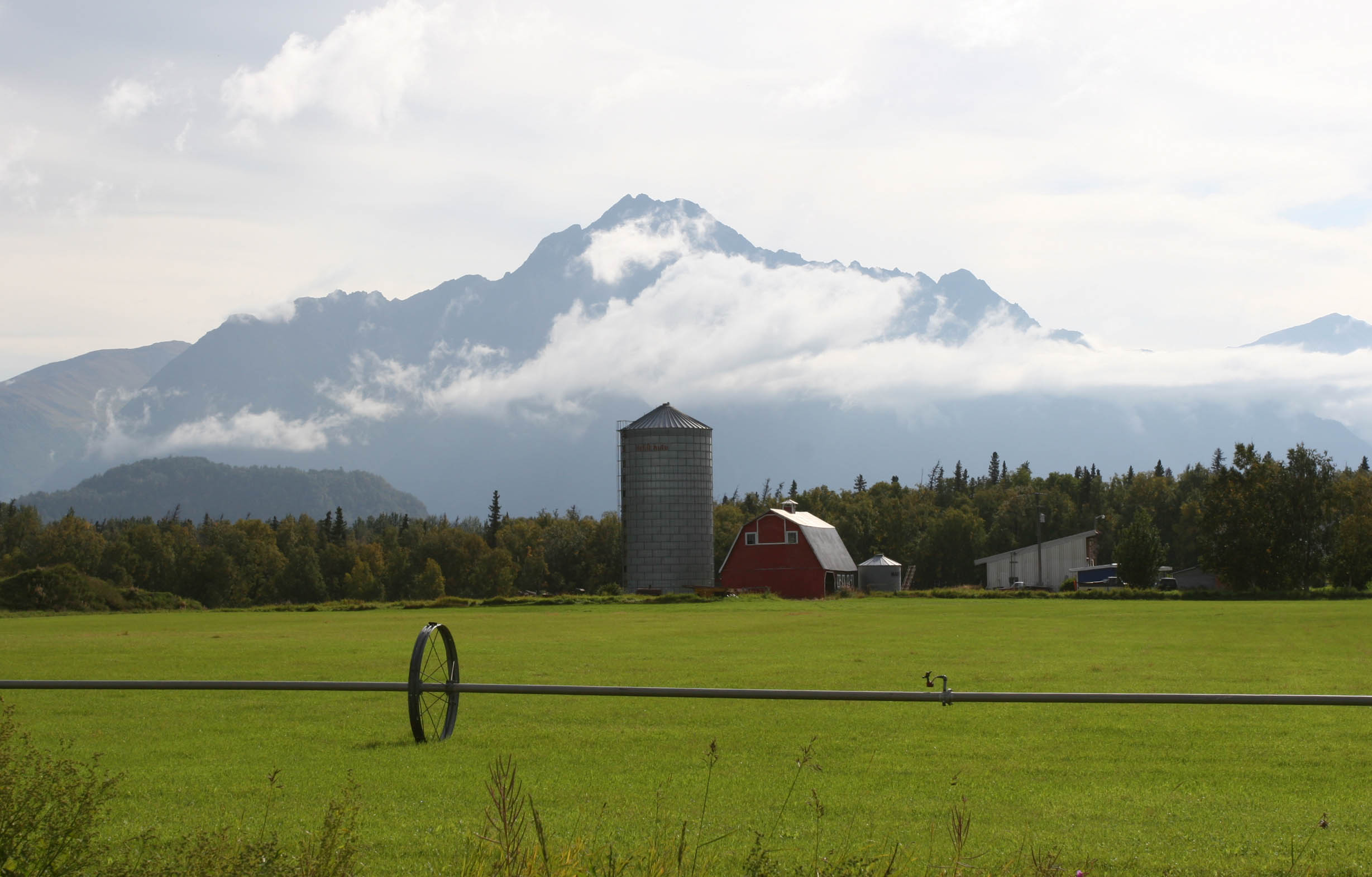
A family farm located in Palmer, Matanuska-Susitna Borough, Alaska, United States.

Examination of mental health of agricultural workers in the United States shows that the agricultural workforce suffering from mental illnesses and disorders is widespread. A 2018 report highlighted the fact that male farmers, ranchers, and agricultural managers were nearly twice as likely to die by suicide as the general working population (32.2 suicides per 100,000 people compared to 17.3 suicides per 100,000 people, respectively). Note, in 2020 male suicide rates are 3.88 times higher than female rates.

== Background ==
Farming is defined as "the science and art of cultivating plants and livestock." Thus, the agricultural workforce includes farmers, ranchers, and workers engaged in agriculture. In addition to the workforce, the agricultural community also includes family members of workers, in particular, spouses and children.

Mental health, or mental well-being, is defined by the World Health Organization (WHO) as "a state of well-being in which an individual realizes his or her own abilities, can cope with the normal stresses of life, can work productively and is able to make a contribution to his or her community." On the other hand, the terms mental illness and mental disorder refer to a broad range of illnesses that often include "some combination of disturbed thoughts, emotions, behavior and relationships with others."

While sometimes used interchangeably with mental health, the term behavioral health, or behavioral well-being, specifically refers to the connection between individual behaviors and health. Behavioral disorders include conditions that have a genetic or biological component (e.g. Attention Deficit Hyperactivity Disorder, ADHD) as well as behaviors, such as drug and alcohol abuse, gambling addictions, or other behaviors that can have negative consequences on an individual health and quality of life. The latter category of behavioral disorders often develop as a result of mental illness, and are therefore often considered together.

The fields of mental and behavioral health focus on 1) promoting, supporting, and sustaining mental and behavioral well-being and 2) reducing the presence, severity, and impact of mental and behavioral disorders.

== Epidemiology ==
Mental illnesses often stem from multiple sources but as an occupation, agriculture ranks as one of the most stressful occupations and one that experiences high suicide rates.

For example, in a 2019 international review article, 71% of studies that compared farming to non-farming populations found that farmers showed worse mental health. In the US, a 2019 study among young Midwestern farmers found that 53% and 71% of study participants met criteria for Major Depressive Disorder and Generalized Anxiety Disorder, respectively. This is compared to the general population, where 2.7% of US adults suffer from Generalized Anxiety Disorder and another 7.1% suffer from Major Depressive Disorder.

Each of these conditions has the potential to lead to suicide. As previously indicated, 2015 data from the U.S. National Violent Death Registry System (NVDRS), maintained by the Centers for Disease Control and Prevention (CDC) reported a suicide rate of 32.2 per 100,000 farmers, ranchers, and agricultural managers. This report also highlights a suicide rate of 17.3 per 100,000 people for both agriculture employees and the general working-age population, indicating a much higher risk to farmers compared to the general population.

Although assessments of mental health in rural regions have been sparse over time, studies indicate that there has been no noteworthy progress in the past four decades. This stagnation is particularly striking given that scholars initially brought attention to mental health and well-being challenges in rural communities during the late twentieth century.

== Risk factors ==
A wide range of factors affect the mental health of agricultural populations, particularly farm families. Some of these factors are similar to the general population and have in recent years been summarized within the social determinants of mental health framework with consideration of both individual and structural level factors. Others are specific to the agricultural sector.

=== Family farming as a lifestyle/culture (not just occupation) ===
Family farming is a family business where the family members are the employees, their workplace is their home, and success is a function of the capabilities of the family members. The intermixing of family roles with economic roles means that stressed farms are stressed families and the needs of the farm, not the individual family members, come first and foremost.

Often, the operators of family farms are caretakers of a piece of earth that has been maintained by generations of farmers before them. If they lose the farm, they lose their home, their identity, and their legacy. They hope their children will choose the farming life and continue this legacy for generations to come. Farming is a family activity in an environment with strong cultural values. Children work before and after school to contribute to the farm's success. As a farm family ages, the stresses of transitioning the farm to the next generation become a source of stress with legal implications and role conflicts as intergenerational opinions differ as to how to manage the future of the farm.

Caregiving responsibilities across multiple generations also place financial and emotional strain on farm families. A 2026 survey of 704 farming caregivers in the U.S. Northeast and Midwest found that 60% cared for both children and older or disabled adults simultaneously, with dual-caregiving households reporting greater financial pressure and higher demand for formal caregiving support.

=== Farm characteristics ===
Farm characteristics shape mental health in a variety of ways, including seasonality of the work, type of work, and workplace environment. Farmers work long days alone in an isolated environment during the growing season. They spend the "off-season" making repairs and getting caught up on the work not done during the busy season while preparing for spring planting. For livestock farmers, there is no "off-season" since the animals require daily attention.

Farmers are required to make important business decisions daily with inadequate information about the projected prices of inputs, future demand for their products, and market prices for their crops and animals. If any of these factors are unfavorable, they face increasing levels of debt and stress. Agricultural work is equivalent to being an entrepreneur without the access to capital and where the probability of showing a profit is not only uncertain, but unpredictable. Job satisfaction requires a balance between effort and reward, but economically this balance does not exist for most family farmers. For farmers, the reward is far more than economic because it is wrapped up in legacy and personal identity.

=== Macro-level stressors ===
When facing economic challenges, farmers can choose to reduce the number of paid employees that they hire, which leads to longer workdays, or they may choose to diversify or change what they produce. Changes in production are limited to the equipment available to plant and harvest, and the climate that is required for crop production, reducing the flexibility that most businesses need to react to consumer behavior.

Even when farms are successful and can afford to hire workers, they cannot easily hire them. There is a shortage of U.S.-born workers willing to work in agricultural jobs. While U.S. farmers can use the H-2A Temporary Agricultural Worker program, the system has been called burdensome, as it requires legal assistance and extensive paperwork. Moreover, a farmer must initiate the process at least three months in advance with no knowledge of what the growing season will look like. Farmers must pay the travel and living expenses of those they hire to work their farms as well as pay a U.S. Department of Labor pre-determined hourly wage, often making the process more expensive than hiring a U.S.-based worker.

Workers in the United States agricultural sector have the highest rate of fatal and non-fatal injury of any sector. The working conditions involve direct contact with farm machinery and large animals. Machinery breaks down and needs repairing, resulting in costly delays. Handling animals requires training, experience, and a calm mental and physical presence. Aside from the physical demands of farm work, exposures to pesticides and other chemicals, viruses, bacteria, and other human health pathogens are also likely. Children living and working on the farm are frequently exposed to many of the same hazards as their parents.

Environmental stressors such as climate variability will make farming a greater challenge in the future as droughts and extreme weather events become more frequent. Climate has always been a challenge for the farming community, the Dust Bowl of the 1930s being the best example of the devastation that drought can cause. Extreme heat stress, made worse by climate change, will reduce product yields; increase the use of inputs such as pesticides and fertilizers; and impact the health of farmers and field workers. Policy directed at climate change mediation will become important to addressing food security and sustaining agricultural markets, but farmers have no control of these factors. Weather variability, especially related to drought, is one of the most important stressors being reported by farmers in developed countries.

=== Meso-level stressors ===
The personal, interpersonal, and external challenges that farmers face cause extreme stress in an environment where healthcare is not affordable when it is accessible, mental healthcare is lacking, and stigmatization poses a barrier to help-seeking because confidentiality is lacking. Farmers often feel that traditional medical care professionals do not understand farm culture and healthcare workers do not communicate with them in a way that encourages honest discourse.

Individuals in rural farming communities are connected and there are social bonds between individuals within these communities. The cultural norms and expectations of rugged individualism regardless of the circumstances leads farmers to not seek the help they might need. Farmers expect to be capable of solving their own problems, not complaining, and being unwavering in their responsibilities to their families, even when strained beyond measure.

== Diverse sub-populations ==
A diversity of individuals are engaged in agriculture and previous research has shown that these sub-populations can be affected with a different range of stressors, which in turn may call for a range of interventions.

=== Farm men ===
Compared to the general adult male population, the prevalence of depression is higher amongst male farmers (5.3% versus 9.8%, respectively). Agriculture Health Study reports show that 3.0% of the sample population has taken medication for their depression, compared to 13.2% in the general population. The reason for this difference in antidepressant usage is that male farmers have stigmatized attitudes towards mental health but are still just as likely to seek help from a doctor for mental health issues. However, they will seek help for the physical manifestations of stress like hair loss, back pain, headaches, and fatigue.

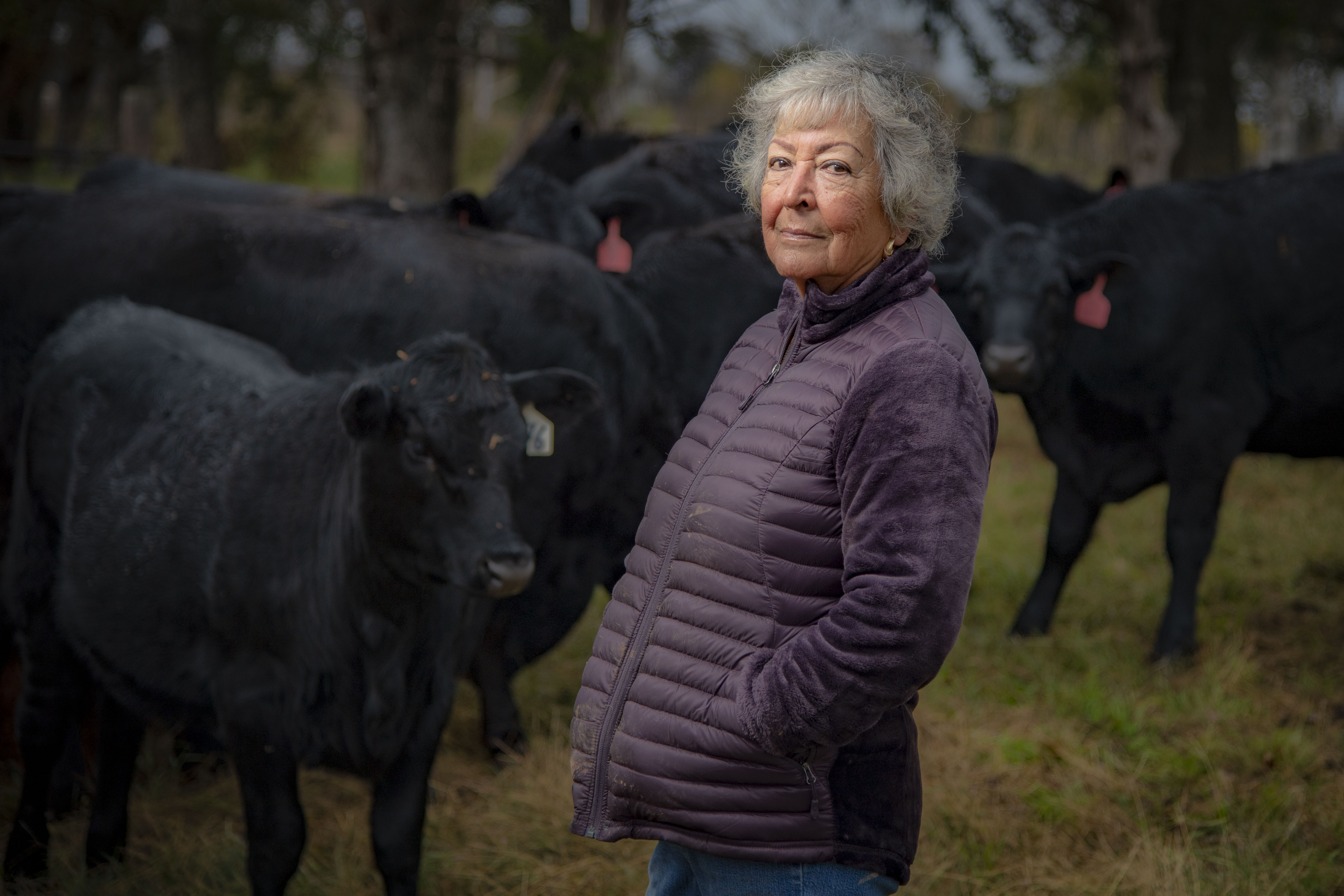
As reported by the USDA in 2017, 36% of farm owners are women, and may take on additional jobs including producer, homemaker, caregiver, and family supporter. Many women may also take jobs off the farm in order to access affordable health insurance.

=== Farm women ===
The U.S. Department of Agriculture's 2017 Census of Agriculture shows that 36% of producers are female. Most take on many different roles within the farm, including producer, homemaker, caregiver, and family supporter. In addition, many women take jobs off of the farm in order to access affordable health insurance. This can also lead to a greater need for childcare, thus creating more financial strain. Combining traditional responsibilities with their work as a farmer can also lead to increased work hours, greater challenges creating an appropriate work-life balance, and increased stress. A 2025 qualitative study of farm women in Ohio, Vermont, and Wisconsin further found that limited rural childcare availability and ongoing worry over keeping children safe from farm hazards were major, persistent stressors that increased rather than diminished as children grew older. Compared to non-agriculture Latina workers, Latina women in the field of agriculture displayed higher rates of stress, anxiety, and depression.

Other issues farming women may deal with is sexism, discrimination based on a person's sex or gender, including the belief that farming is a male profession. Latina migrant farmworkers not only face marginalization due to their sex but also their immigration status and race. Much like their male counterparts, they face job security, home security, violence, home-sickness, and chronic pain from on the job injuries. These stressors are manifested in the form of depression, anxiety, and alcohol abuse which they experience at a higher rate than non-farmworker Latinas.

Women have always played a crucial role in agriculture through their work on the farm, caring for the family and the household, and off-farm employment. Yet, similar to their essential contributions to agriculture, their mental health and well-being have largely been invisible since much of the focus of the research on mental health in agriculture has been on older, male farmers.

=== Children ===
Many family farms will have children that will assist with the farming duties; however, this can increase stresses that are already faced by children such as time for education. Children may work even longer hours during times of economic or environmental stress. For example, a 2019 UNICEF report on the impacts of Australia's ongoing drought, children often had to wake before school to assist with farming tasks before heading to school, then working on the farm into the night before they do homework, going to bed a few hours before having to rise again. Sometimes these farming tasks can prevent students from participating in recreational activities such as sports and other clubs, and at times prevent the child from attending school. This is not to say that parents do not want their children to participate in events, the parents try the best they can; however, most children want to help reduce the workload faced by their parents. Most of these children will have the same attitudes as their parents, that someone else can always be doing worse than them. Despite this attitude, most farmers as well as their children see no rest building their stresses.

Although there are many downsides to children working on farms, a cross-sectional study based on the Health Behavior in School-aged Children survey found that girls from rural farms had "more positive mental health" than those not from farms. However, this study also concluded that farm girls had higher overt risk-taking, which is associated with mental health issues and stress.

=== LGBTQ+ ===
Discrimination, prejudice, and stigma towards the LGBTQ+ community is higher in rural areas than in urban areas due to rural communities prizing cultural homogeneity, religion and 'traditional views'. This lack of social support and stigma may lead to a sense of isolation, poor mental health, and a reluctance to access rural primary and preventative healthcare. Some studies have reported higher levels of threats, property damage, and discrimination in rural LGBTQ+ individuals, as well as homophobia from neighbors.

=== Racial and ethnic groups ===
According to the U.S. Department of Agriculture (USDA) 2017 Census of Agriculture, only 5% of producers identified themselves as nonwhite. These farmers experience additional stresses and adversity due to racism, prejudice, low socioeconomic status, and poor social support. Nonwhite farmers' voices and histories are often excluded from discussions of US agricultural history and practices. For example, the regenerative agriculture movement has gained popularity in farming communities in recent years, but many nonwhite farmers have felt left out of the discussion, despite these 'new' farming practices being used by nonwhite communities for many generations.

In the 1990s, after continued complaints from Black farmers that the USDA had discriminatory loan and disaster relief practices, class action lawsuits were brought against the USDA and became collectively known as Pigford v. Glickman. While a settlement was finally negotiated, many saw it as inadequate for addressing past discrimination as a whole. In 2021, the American Rescue Plan Act created a US$123 million USDA debt relief and loan forgiveness program for nonwhite farmers in another attempt to correct past discriminatory practices, but its future is currently uncertain.

=== Migrant/seasonal workers ===
Migrant workers face many stresses including high job demands, low job security and low job control, meaning that there is a lot expected of them and it is very easy to replace workers if they are unable to perform such tasks. In a study of North Carolina migrant farm workers, Hiott et al. (2008) found that migrant farm workers who experienced social isolation and poor work conditions were more likely to have symptoms of anxiety and depression, and Sandberg et al. (2012) found that 28% of Latino farmworkers reported depressive symptoms.

Migrant and seasonal worker health is also impacted by income, as one study showed personal health improved as income rose. These workers also are disproportionately affected by healthcare access issues, including lack of insurance, poverty, and cultural and language barriers. Moreover, some workers may not seek help for health issues due to fears over their immigration status, lack of transportation, and inability to get time off from their job.

== Coping strategies ==
There are a variety of strategies that are recommended to help farmers improve their mental health. Those experiencing mental health issues are recommended to seek professional help. Those who think someone else is experiencing or at risk of experiencing mental health issues, are recommended to express interest, listen in a non-judgmental way, acknowledge what they are going through, and encourage seeking appropriate professional help.

There are many steps that can be taken to cope with or reduce agriculture-related stressors. One is to develop a family and business plan for emergencies, which may include uncontrollable weather, machinery breakdowns, unexpected illness, fluctuating commodity prices, or other issues. Additionally, the American Academy of Sleep Medicine recommends getting at least seven to eight hours of sleep each night, though this may be difficult for farmers, especially during planting and harvesting seasons. Short breaks can be taken as needed, particularly when stressors emerge and before decisions are made.

Creating a professional and social network they can reach out to for guidance when needed, and listen to when their community needs help, is another recommended coping strategy. This also assists with setting goals around healthy habits and share these with others in their network to help hold each other accountable. Even while physical distancing, frequent contact can be maintained through phone, email, or video calls. Being mindful of diet and of alcohol and drug consumption can ensure that these substances are not being used to mask a mental health condition. When an event can't be controlled, farmers can find ways to control their attitude and their response instead.

=== Barriers to help-seeking ===
Agricultural populations face many barriers to seeking help. Farmers often experience stress or exhaustion that can delay seeking treatment. Choosing to seek help requires complex decision-making, which may be challenging while experiencing a mental health disorder, or from barriers such as lack of access, knowledge of resources, or community of support (stigma). Many living in rural areas lack access to local mental health services, the time and resources needed to travel to more distant providers, or the technology resources to connect with telehealth providers remotely. The perception of high treatment fees or lack of insurance coverage may also prevent some farmers from seeking help, as agriculture sector workers are less likely to have health insurance.

In addition, agricultural communities may normalize certain types of mental illness, such as depression, which propagates a perception that treatments are not necessary or worthwhile, or can be addressed through self-reliant means. Some may feel that they cannot receive treatment in a private way—either their car will be recognized in a parking lot, or they lack the privacy in their home to have a telehealth visit that won't be overheard. Healthcare providers also face the challenge of providing culturally appropriate treatment options that accommodate patients' beliefs and practices, preferred languages, individual and family histories, differences in symptoms, and preferred approaches to treatment.

== History ==
The early days of research on mental health on farmers, their families, and farmworkers was predominantly focused on alcohol and drug abuse. Rural individuals were recognizing that there were members of their communities that were mentally ill (depression, schizophrenia). Due to a lack of medical/psychiatric network in rural U.S. many of these cases would go untreated and uncounted. In 1963 there was an attempt at surveilling mental health of youth and young children by Jenkins. He found that there was lower incidence of "mental disturbance" and "mental illness" amongst rural youth.

In interviews of rural leaders, Bentz et al. (1971) found that participants recognized mental illnesses such as schizophrenia and depression within their communities, but families could not do much to help them. A 1978 Rural Task Force on Mental Health report to President Jimmy Carter noted a lack of understanding of the mental health needs of rural communities as well as lack of research into the causes and barriers to treatment.

Also known as the 1980s U.S. farm debt crisis, sudden shifts in federal fiscal policies, export declines due to a Soviet Union embargo, and record production left farmers largely based in the Midwest saddled with debts they could not repay. In response to the challenges faced by farmers and the epidemic proportion of suicides. As a result of farmer suicide, research on farmers' mental health increased sharply with a focus on financial difficulties farms faced during the 1980s and depression. A spotlight on rural mental health and specifically on farmers led to calls for more mental health access in rural communities along with government action. Likewise, the U.S government passed the Family Farmer Bankruptcy Act in 1986 to help keep farmers on their land, and rolled out subsidies and loans to provide some economic relief to struggling farmers with the 1990 Farm Bill. Responses to mental health challenges came from state agencies of agriculture, university extension, and farmer organizations through suicide hotlines, fundraising to support household needs, and family mediation services.

Published research pertaining to farmer suicides and mental health more generally waned in the late 1990s and through the 2000s. However, there was a gradual shift to include migrant farmworkers within the narratives of agricultural mental health. Research on migrant farmworkers has focused on stressors, presentation of stress, depression, anxiety, violence, and the impact of the lack of medical care.

Following the 2008 economic recession, there was another peak in agricultural mental health research to assess the effects of the Great Recession on farmer stress. However, the evidence for an uptick in worsening mental health and suicides was inconclusive. Soon after the recession, a near-decade-long drought in the Western United States and particularly in California brought to the forefront the woes of climate change.
