= Farmers' suicides in the United States =

Phenomenon in the rural United States

- Part of suicide in the United States
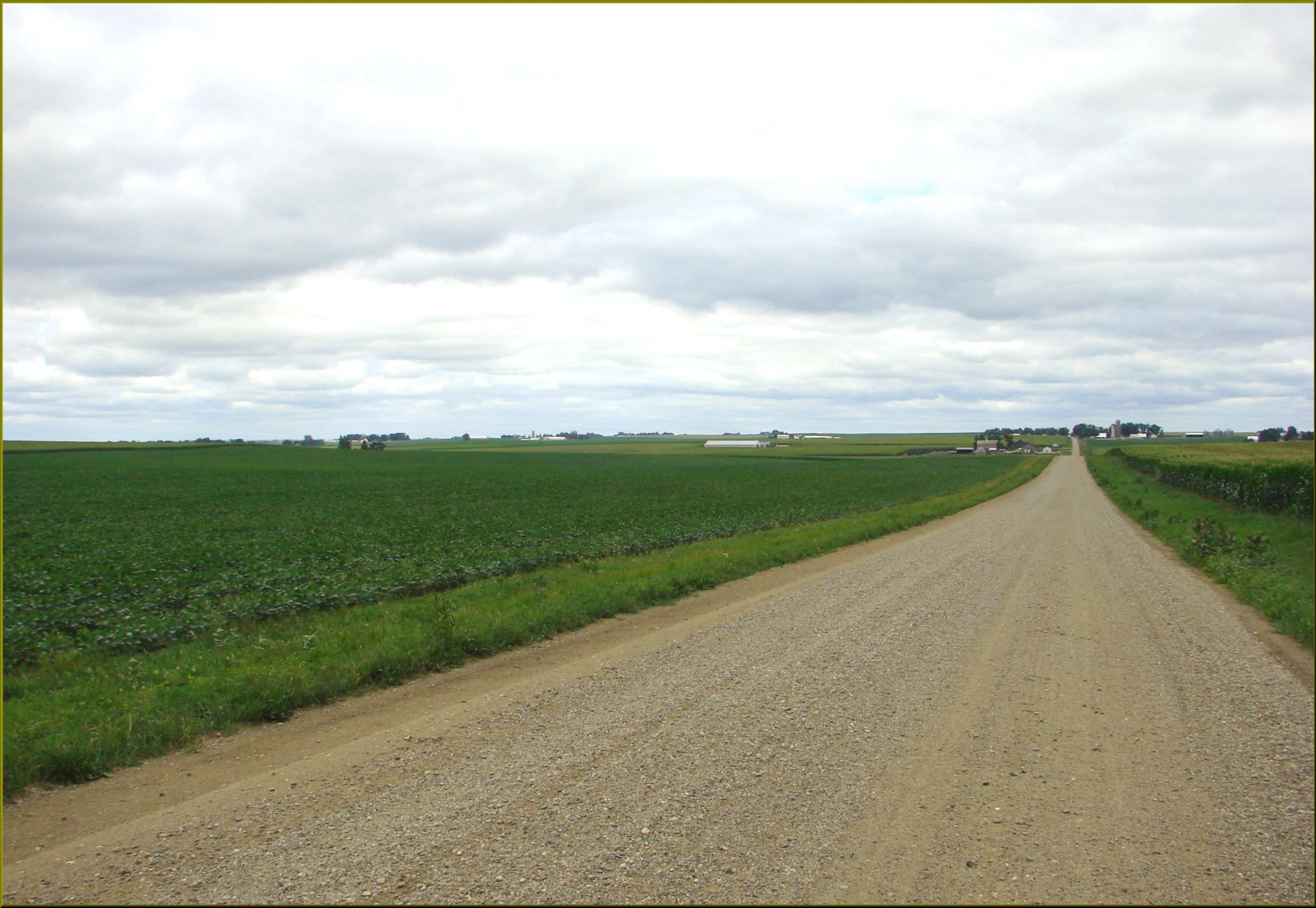
- Farmland in Hull, Iowa, one of the states experiencing high levels of suicide among farmers

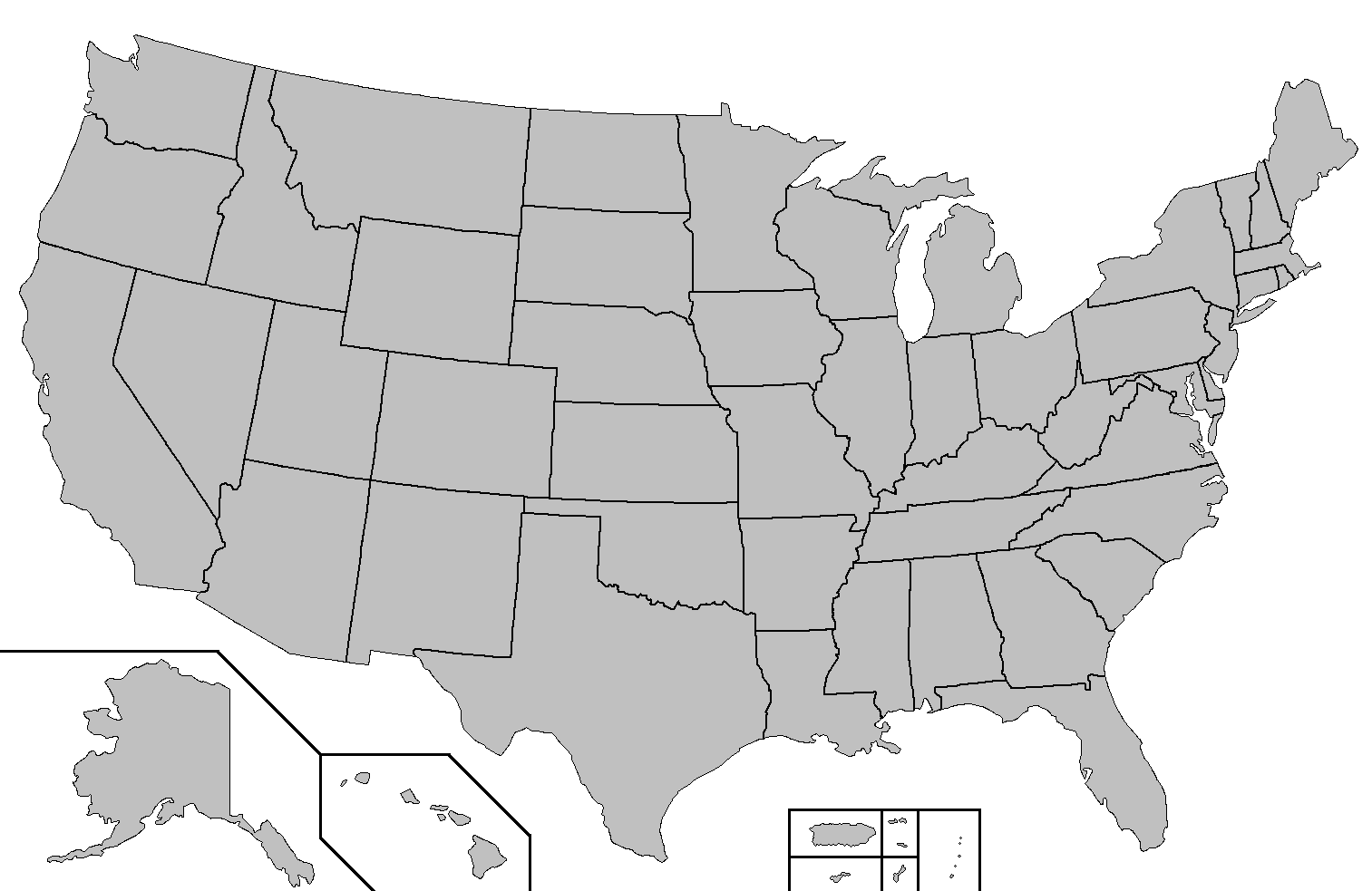
- Location: United States
- Type: Ongoing
- Cause: Debt, indignity, isolation

Farmers' suicides in the United States refers to the instances of American farmers taking their own lives, largely since the 1980s, partly due to their falling into debt, but mainly as a larger mental-health crisis among U.S. agriculture workers. In the Midwest alone, over 1,500 farmers have taken their own lives since the 1980s. It mirrors a crisis happening globally: in Australia, a farmer dies by suicide every ten days; in the United Kingdom, one farmer a week takes their own life; and in France it is one every two days. Almost 300,000 farmers have died by suicide since 1995 in India.

Farmers are among the most likely to die by suicide, in comparison to other occupations, according to a study published in January 2020 by the Centers for Disease Control and Prevention (CDC). Researchers at the University of Iowa found that farmers, and others in the agricultural trade, had the highest suicide rate of all occupations from 1992 to 2010, the years covered in a 2017 study. The rate was 3.5 times that of the general population. This echoed a study conducted the previous year by the CDC and another undertaken by the National Rural Health Association (NRHA).

Most family farmers seem to agree on what led to their plight: government policy. In the years after the New Deal, they say, the United States set a price floor for farmers, essentially ensuring they received a minimum wage for the crops they produced. But the government began rolling back this policy in the 1970s, and now the global market largely determines the price they get for their crops. Big farms can make do with lower prices for crops by increasing their scale; a few cents per gallon of cow's milk adds up if you have thousands of cows.

—Time, November 27, 2019

As of April 2023, the suicide rate within the farming community exceeds that of the general population by three and a half times.

== Background ==
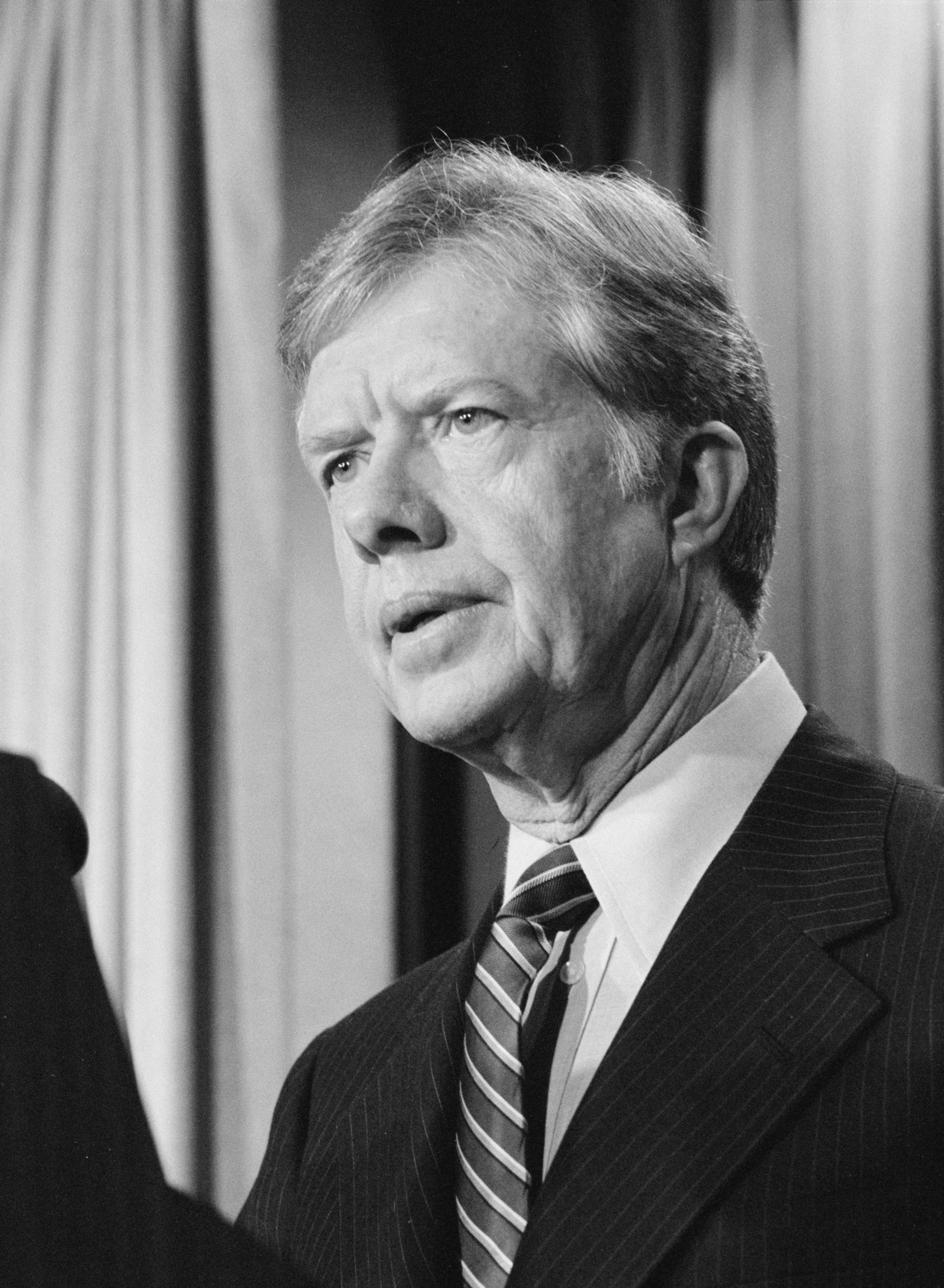
Jimmy Carter in 1980

In 1980, Federal Reserve actions to stem stagflation and president Jimmy Carter's implementation of a grain embargo against the Soviet Union resulted in the 1980s farm crisis, resulting in a large increase in farm foreclosures.

In 1985, after Ronald Reagan had been president for four years, the Farm Credit System (FCS) lost $2.7 billion – the largest one-year loss of any financial institution in U.S. history. That same year, 40-year-old farmer Dean Hagedorn walked into a bank in Spencer, Iowa, with a check for $94,000, the proceeds of that year's corn crop from his farm of 560 acres (230 ha). He planned to use three-quarters to keep his bank loan payments up to date, and to parcel the remainder out to other creditors, but the bank kept the entire amount.

"There's a silent atrophy creeping across the heartland", said Joan Blundall, a mental-health counselor in rural Iowa, in 1987. "And I don't think anyone knows yet where we are headed." As of 2019, farm debt was at $416 billion, an all-time high, and median farm income was projected to be −$1,644. Over half of all farmers have lost money every year since 2013, and farm loan delinquencies are increasing.

According to the National Rural Health Association (NRHA), farmers' suicide rate is 3.5 times greater than that observed in the broader population. From 2000 to 2018, there was a 34% increase in the suicide rate in urban areas compared to 48% in rural areas. In March 2023, the association, which has a membership of 21,000 including rural hospitals and clinics, submitted a letter to House and Senate agricultural committees calling on them to respond to what the NRHA's chief executive officer called "a deep-seated and longstanding problem." The association requested a tailored national crisis line to respond to farmers, along with funding increase for the stress assistance network.

== Causes of farmers' suicides ==
Several causes of the farmers' suicides have been pinpointed:

- Farmers experienced a loss of pride in being able to either keep their farm, or run it to its full potential. Some farmers expect to reach certain milestones, such as passing the farm on to the next generation or expanding their facility.
- Prices for commodities such as corn, soybeans, milk and meat had shrunk by around half between 2012 and 2020.

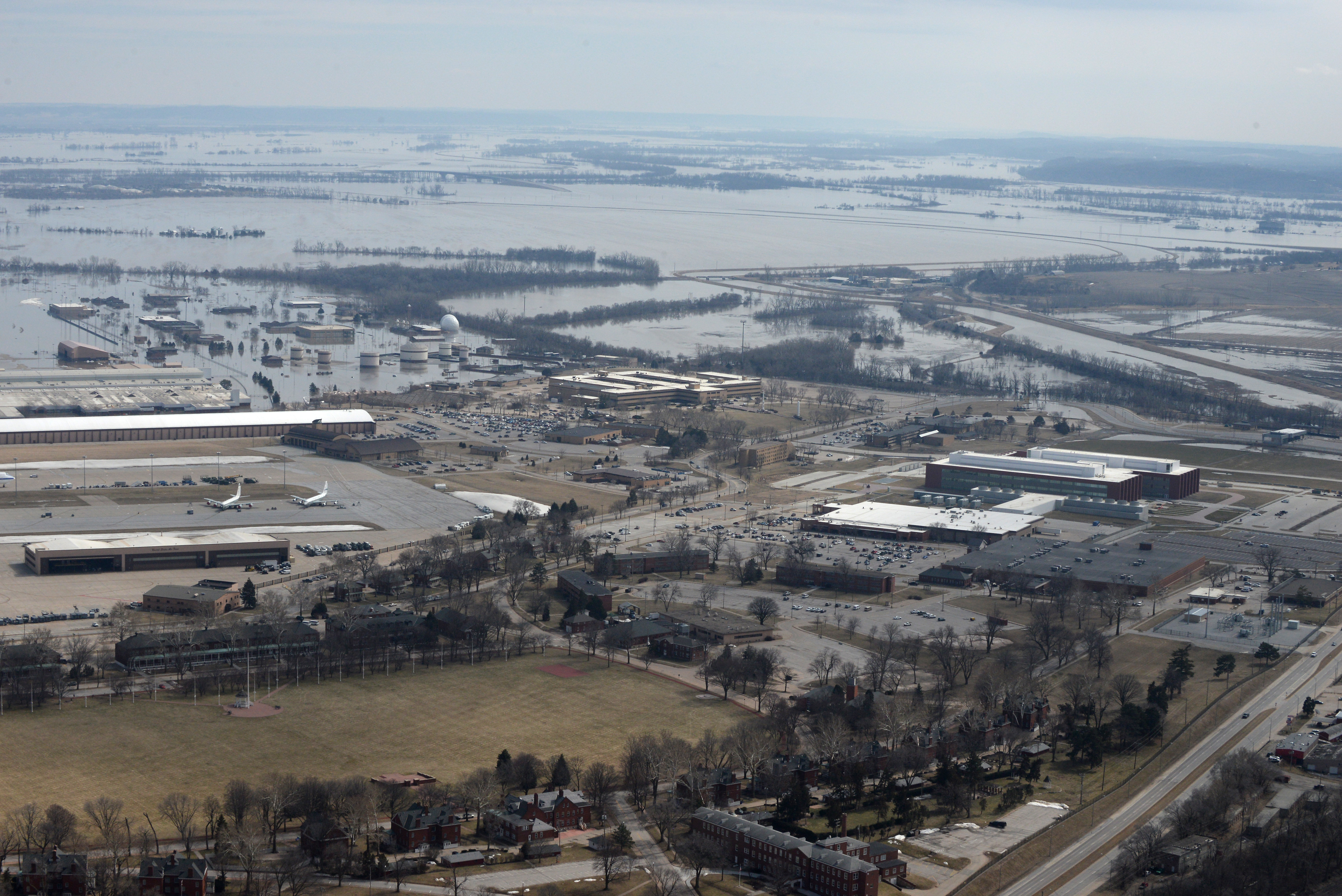
Flooding in Nebraska in 2019

- Farm debt had increased by around a third since 2007, rising to levels last experienced in the 1980s. Interest rates rose from single digits to 21.5% in 1981. A $28-billion federal-aid provision, rolled out by the Trump administration over two years, did not provide enough to recoup income lost during the China–United States trade war.
- Physical isolation can make it hard for farmers to get assistance for their mental-health problems.
- Farmers often own guns, thus providing "an immediate means to act on deadly impulses".
- The consolidation of rural schools resulted in farm children having to ride on the bus for hours each day.
- Inclement weather, including the Midwestern floods and the droughts of 1983 and 1988, prevented farmers from utilizing almost 20,000,000 acres (8,100,000 ha) in just 2019.
- Soybean exports to China dropped 75% from 2017 to 2018.

A study published in 2021 found that food producers have higher rates of depression, anxiety and suicide risk (with self-blame being the only variable that had a significant association with this risk).

In Oklahoma, specifically, Eric Ramírez-Ferrero (who grew up in Enid) found that "large numbers of people could not keep up with technological progress and have had their expectations of a comfortable life frustrated."

Zach Ducheneaux, administrator of the Farm Service Agency, said: "Our producers are constantly expected to do more with less, innovate and improve, raise a family, preserve a legacy—and let's not forget feeding and clothing the world while we're at it."

Financial pressures are exacerbated by international trade, pandemics that decimate livestock, and other global forces, as well as weather-related natural forces. Farmers perceive mental illness, such as depression, as a weakness to be overcome with hard work, and avoid seeking treatment.

Between April 2024 and March 2025, over 250 farms in the United States went bankrupt.

== Localities affected ==
=== Midwest ===
More than 900 farmers took their own lives in five upper Midwestern states during the 1980s farm crisis, described as "the worst agricultural economic crisis since the Great Depression". Between 2014 and 2018, over 450 more committed suicide (around one-third of them between 2017 and 2018), although the actual total is believed to be higher because not every state provided suicide data for each year, some redacted portions of the data, and some reported the deaths as agricultural accidents. 75 farmers committed suicide across six Midwestern states in 2017. That total increased by one the following year. Of those 76 farmers, eighteen lived in Missouri and Kansas, fifteen in Wisconsin, thirteen in Illinois and twelve in North Dakota.

==== Iowa ====
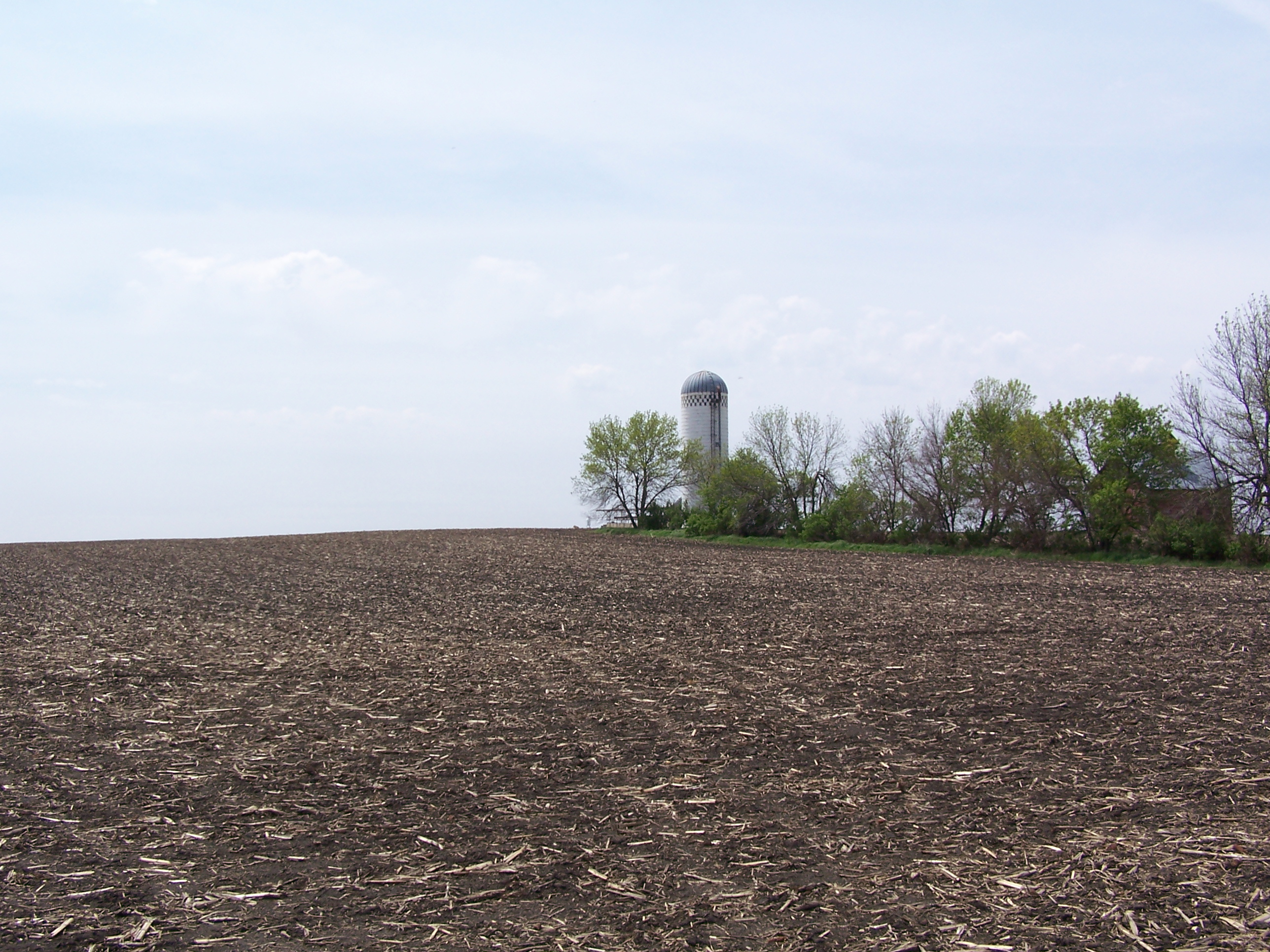
Sibley, Iowa

47-year-old Philip Fetter, of Chelsea, took his own life on July 25, 1982, leaving his wife of 24 years, Norma, to care for ten children on her own, and to cope with overwhelming debt. Their farm and house were sold back to the Federal Land Bank at a substantial loss. Norma survived her husband by 37 years. She died in 2019, aged 85.

On July 31, 1984, 56-year-old Kenneth Meisgeier hanged himself in the machine shed on his farm in Arlington after declaring bankruptcy. He was found by his son. Meisgeier belonged to the most at-risk group of farmers, who were over 50 and could not see a way forward.

On April 3, 1985, Daniel Cutler, of Sioux City, shot himself at an abandoned farmstead on his way back home to his wife, Karen, after visiting family. Cutler, 38, left a message hinting at where his suicide note could be found. "The opening statement of the suicide note was 'The farm killed me,'" Karen (now Heidman) said. Cutler became deeply indebted and the value of his farmland had depreciated significantly.

On December 9, 1985, Dale Burr, 63, of Lone Tree fatally shot himself, in the presence of a police officer, after killing his wife Emily, 64; John Hughes, 46, a bank president; and a neighboring farmer, Richard Goody. 38. At the time of his death, Burr was in debt more than $500,000. He left a note beside his wife's body that said, "I'm sorry. I can't take the problems anymore." The news shocked the entire state, including Governor Terry Branstad, who knew the banker's family. Burr had been pressured by his bank, Hills Bank and Trust Company, to sell his livestock and machinery to pay some of his debt. He had been in a dispute with Goody regarding farming 80 acres (32 ha) of land.

Herman "Charlie" Behrens, of Sibley, tried to keep his family's 124-year farming tradition alive, but ultimately had to admit defeat. "I only had about $19,000 in loans", he said in 1987. "The same banker I dealt with all my life, he comes out one day and says the value of my machinery is $5,000 below the value of my loan. I said, 'You know me. I'm Charlie. I never missed a payment in all my years.' Then he points to the top line of my loan where it says payable on demand. They'd call up at 7:30 in the morning. 'You got any money yet, Charlie?' they'd ask. And then they'd call back at 8:30 at night. I didn't know people could get that way. But, you see, they were scared, too, with all the problems around. And they figured they'd better get something out of some of us while they could. There were a lot of heart attacks around these parts. And then Jean fell sick." She died in 1986.

On May 11, 2011, Matt Peters left a suicide note for his wife, Ginnie, on the desk in his workshop in Perry. He killed himself in his truck the following day.

Barb Kalbach, a corn and soybean farmer in Dexter, says that on the square mile of land where she lives, five different families used to grow corn, beans, hay, cattle and pigs. Since around 2005, the other four families have given up and moved out of town. Kalbach also now has to travel 75 miles to buy chemicals, and there is no longer a local farm equipment repair business. "All the thousands of farmers that have left the land — all the businesses have gone with them."

==== Kansas ====
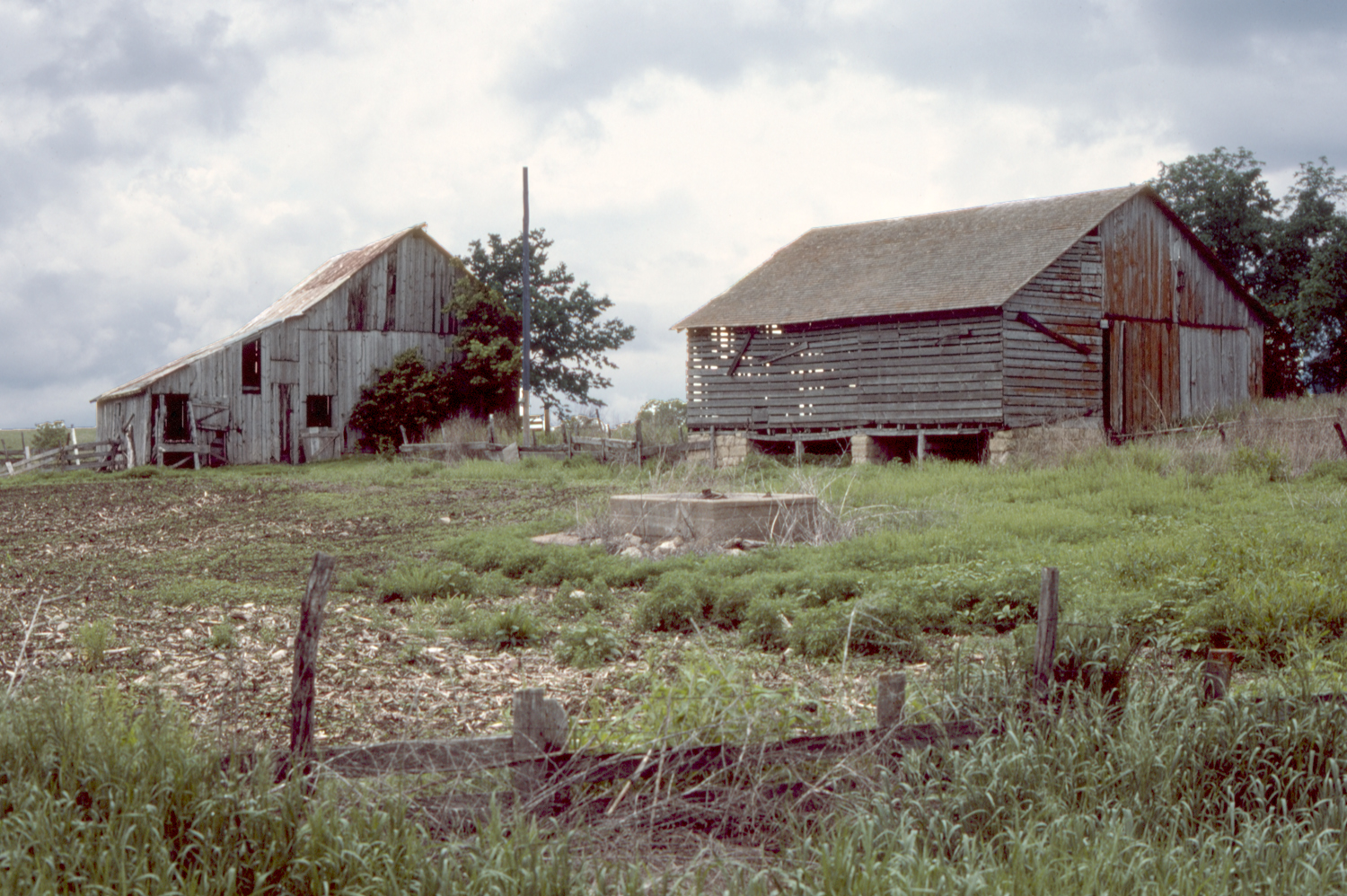
Barns in Hanover, Kansas

John Blaske, of Onaga, said in 2017: "In the last 25 to 30 years, there's not a day that goes by that I don't think about suicide." He lost his house in a fire on Thanksgiving Day in 1982 which left him and his wife homeless. The farm crisis intensified around the same time, and their bank raised their interest rate from 7% to 18%. Blaske filed for bankruptcy and lost 265 acres (107 ha).

In 2017, suicide was the eighth-highest cause of death in Kansas. This ranked at 13th nationally for suicides.

==== Michigan ====
Farmers are among those with the highest rates of suicide in Michigan, and it is a rate over five times that of the other working sectors of the state. In 2023, eleven people working in agricultural industries, including farming, died by suicide. Farming families own 95% of the state's farms, but in 2023 less than half of those had an income that was net positive. Michigan has seen a 7% decline in farms since 2017, with around 44,000 remaining as of 2025.

==== Minnesota ====
Larry Ruhland, 56, of Watkins, died in 2006. He killed himself on the farm he operated with his wife, Barbara. "I didn't put it together, because I didn't even think of the fact that Larry was under as much stress as he was under," she said. Barbara reached out to Ted Matthews, director of MN Rural Mental Health in Hutchinson. "He was a real, real guy who understood farmers and understood farm life and respected it but, at the same time, wanted you to understand how it could really suck you in and drain you completely dry", continued Ruhland. She rues the fact that her husband and Matthews did not meet.

Meg Moynihan runs a dairy farm with her husband around ten miles west of New Prague. Her husband struggled with depression and anxiety, but recovered. Moynihan realized the importance of mental health and, in 2021, wrote a grant proposal that resulted in that year's United States Department of Agriculture (USDA) award.

In 2023, Minnesota clergy began training to prevent farmers' suicides. Around eighty pastors enrolled in a month-long suicide-prevention program.

==== Ohio ====
Rural areas of Ohio have some of the highest rates of suicide state-wide, according to the Ohio Department of Health.

Three farmers from the close-knit community of Georgetown committed suicide between mid-2015 and 2017.

Several initiatives have been launched to combat the problem, including the "Ohio's Got Your Back" campaign.

==== Wisconsin ====
In Fremont, the Rieckmann family has been raising cattle for nearly two centuries. John Rieckmann and his wife, Mary, purchased a dairy farm from John's father, on land that had been in the family for three generations. As of 2019, the farm was $300,000 in debt, and it was making only $16 for every 100 pounds of milk sold, a 40% decrease from 2013. In January 2019, Wisconsin had 8,110 milk-cow herds, according to the state Department of Agriculture, Trade and Consumer Protection — 691 down on the previous year.

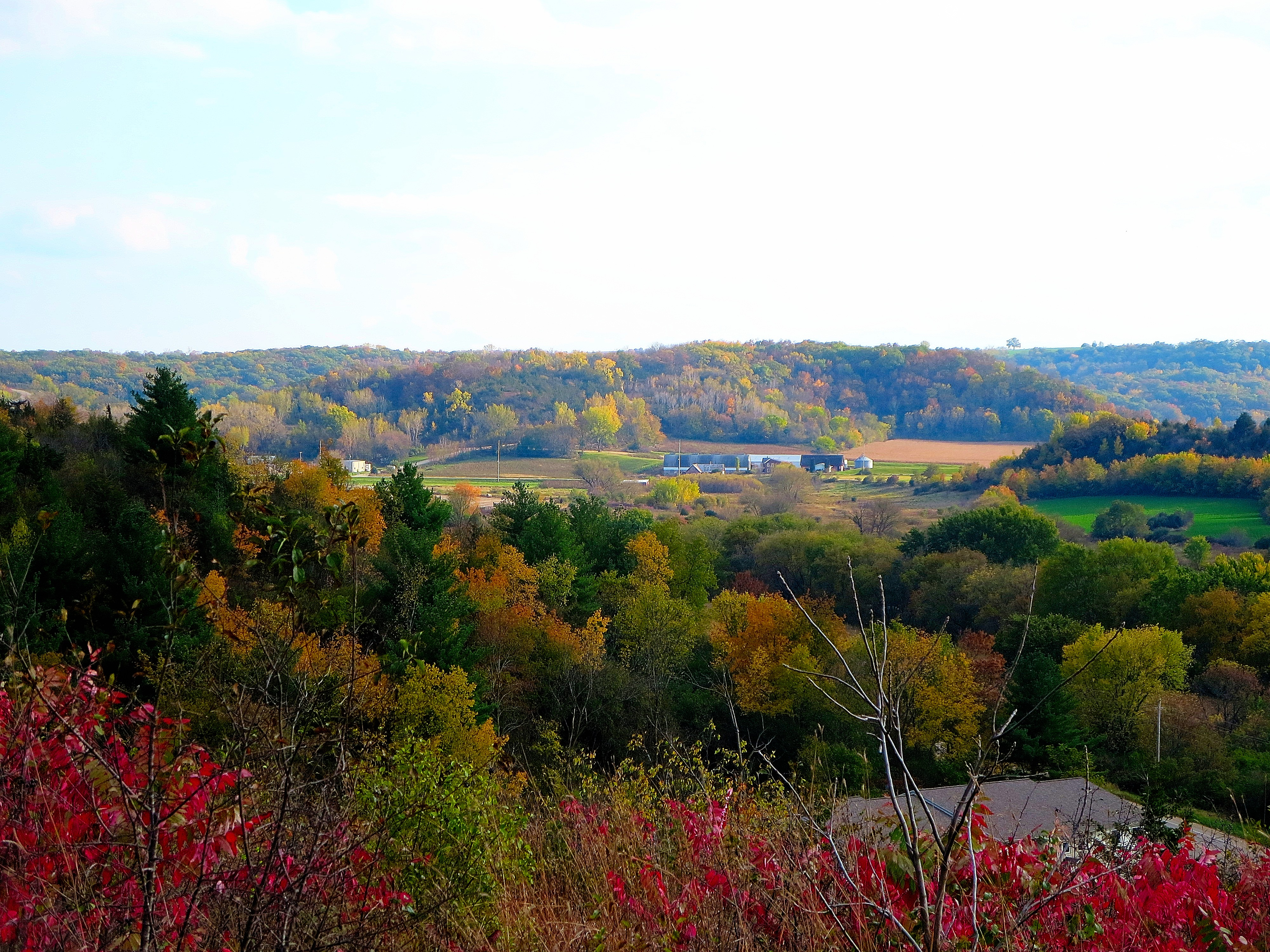
Farmland in Wisconsin's Driftless Area

Randy Roecker, a dairy farmer in Loganville, was losing $30,000 a month in 2019. He inherited his grandparents' farm, which they started around ninety years earlier. In 2008, when milk prices went down significantly, Roecker said: "I would get in the truck, and I would drive out on our back 40-acre field and sit in the truck and just cry. I never thought depression would happen to me. But this financial struggle and feeling that you're losing this legacy that your grandfather started and it just really played a lot with my mind."

Roecker's neighbor, 57-year-old Leon A. Statz, committed suicide in October 2018 after financial struggles forced him to sell the fifty Holstein dairy cows he had on his 200-acre (81 ha) farm, instead moving into grain and beef farming. The relative uncertainty of their new venture caused Statz endless anxiety, even though the farm was actually prospering. Statz, who had inherited the family farm from his parents, began a part-time role as a meat cutter in a local grocery store, his wife later saying it was to punish himself because he thought he was a failure. Statz attempted suicide four months after the sale of the cows. He said goodbye to his children over the telephone, then swallowed a handful of pills while locking himself in a shed with farm equipment running inside it. His suicide note read: "I wish I never sold (our, my) cows! I'm a dairy farmer. I want my old life back, but I can't get it anymore. Every thing I do fails. I didn't plan ahead for this ... I really screwed up!"

Leon's wife, Brenda, heard the tractor equipment running and shut them down, despite her husband's attempts to prevent her doing so. She opened the shed's door, to let air pass through, and called the police and Rev. Donald Glanzer Jr., the pastor of their church, St. Peter's Lutherhan in Loganville. Statz was hospitalized for three days.

Shortly before he died, Statz explained to his wife how he felt:

Like you're in the bottom of this hole, this pit, and you can see the top and you're climbing, climbing, and struggling your way to the top. And just when you get to the top, it goes higher, and you keep climbing, and pretty soon you get tired and you can't climb anymore.

Ethan Statz found his father's body in the shed for the farm's heifers on October 8, 2018. In 2023, Statz's wife, his sons and his daughter-in-law were running the farm. "Whether he's here or not, somebody still had to get up the next day and feed the cows. Somebody had to get up and do the chores. The crops still had to be harvested that year. There's so much that has to do you didn't have time to just stop," Brenda said.

As a direct result of the incident, Roecker, Statz and Dorothy Harms set up Farmer Angel Network, a support group for local families in the farming industry. In April 2023, the New York Times reported on Statz's widow and mother to three children. Rain had been falling in the Driftless Area for weeks, which caused their fields to flood and delayed their harvest. "A note in the pocket of his work pants described how depression had robbed him of the hope and pride he had in running a third-generation dairy farm," wrote Elizabeth Williamson. Brenda was involved in the formation of the Farmer Angel Network.

Emily Harris, a farmer in Monroe, is blunt with her perspective: "Just stop complaining about farming and quit. You can't make any money. Just be done." She and Brandi Harris shut down their 40-cow dairy in May 2019 after becoming several hundred thousand dollars in debt. They sold their cows but kept their barn, their house and about 90 acres (36 ha) of farmland.

In 2023, the Green Bay Press-Gazette reported that suicides in rural areas of the state continued to climb.

=== Colorado ===
As reported in 2021, drought conditions in western Colorado over two decades also led to suicides amongst its farmers.

=== Montana ===
Montana saw drought conditions from mid-2020 and throughout 2021. On top of that, an invasion of grasshoppers destroyed rangeland and crops. In August 2021, the U.S. Department of Agriculture put the quality of the state's spring wheat crop was 67%, "poor to very poor", with just 16% being "good". This led to mental-health concerns in the farming communities.

=== New York ===
Farmland in the Catskills

After decreasing demand for dairy, as customers turned to milk alternatives, a spike in suicides occurred in the state of New York around 2015, resulting in the closure of several hundreds of farms. Dairy sales accounted for about half of total farm sales annually. New York was the third-largest milk-producing state in the U.S. in 2018, according to a New York Times article, over 500 dairy farms around the state closed between 2012 and 2017. The population of dairy cows, however, was on the increase. After a local farmer took his life in January 2018, Agri-Mark, a large co-operative that was one of his customers, sent its 550 members in the state a list of suicide and mental-health hotline numbers. "It's not unusual to get woken up in the middle of the night by a farmer who is potentially suicidal", said Hal McCabe, outreach director for FarmNet.

Fred Morgan, of Eaton, was talked out of suicide by his wife, Judy. The family had become unable to repay six bank loans and debts to various entities. They declared bankruptcy, restructured their finances, and switched to producing organic milk. They were able to sell at $43 per hundredweight, which is about three times the average price for conventional milk. Switching to an organic operation is costly, however; for farmers in debt, it is not an option.

In January 2010, Dean Pierson, a 59-year-old dairy farmer in Copake shot all 51 of his milking cows before turning the gun on himself. He had left suicide notes on cow tag cards, saying he was "overwhelmed" by financial and personal issues.

=== Oklahoma ===
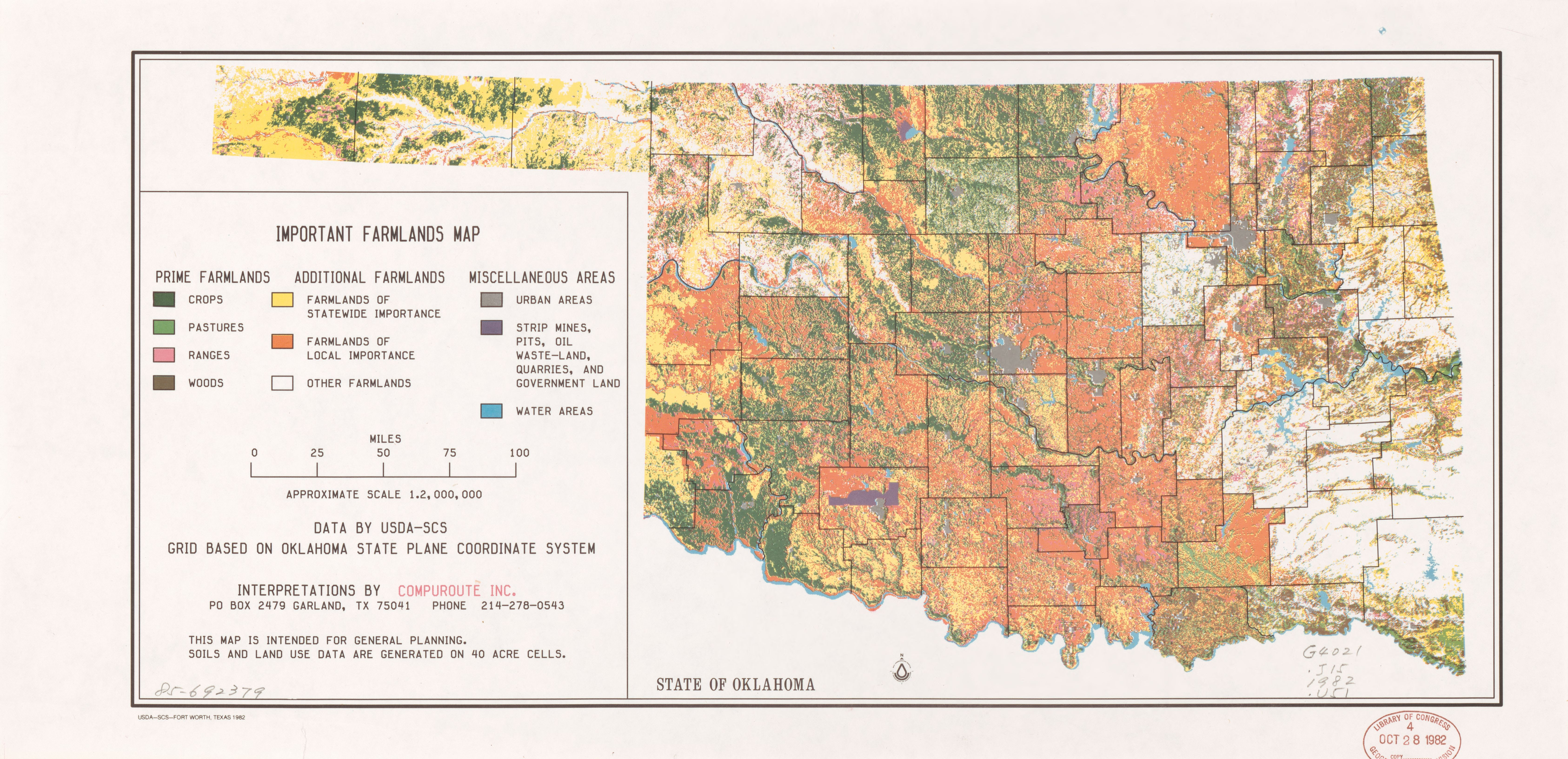
Important farmlands map of Oklahoma (1982)

Between 1983 and 1989, a study revealed that 160 Oklahoman farmers took their own lives – an average of 26 for each of the six years. 43 of the 160 cases occurred between 1988 and 1989. Self-inflicted gunshots to the head or chest were the most common method of suicide.

The existing agricultural crisis line in the state, AG-Link, increased its services and expanded its team, allowing them to respond anywhere in the state. In the build-up to 1988, the team made an average of 120 annual intervention calls. By 1990, it averaged 175.

I hear Mr. Melrose say that he is in financial trouble.

"I'm one of those farmers your project is about, Eric."

As he continued to talk, I listened intently, though my eyes followed a gaggle of geese across the sky until it was nearly out of sight. On this farm, only thirty miles from where I grew up, I knew not to make a spectacle of my acknowledgment of his situation, of his pain. This I had learned.

— Eric Ramírez-Ferrero, Troubled Fields: Men, Emotions, and the Crisis in American Farming (2005)

=== Pennsylvania ===
Brenda Cochran has been a farmer in Westfield since 1975, along with her husband, Joseph. She said she knows of nine suicides related to low milk prices between 2017 and 2019. "It's very, very bleak for us, and many farmers I know are in the same boat. It would take a miracle to sustain us for five years."

A member of Farm Women United, Cochran once had 300 cows; as of 2019 she had around 80.

=== Utah ===
In 2021, drought conditions in Moroni led to Wade and Tina Eliason suffering crop loss valued at over $300,000. Their 700-acre (280 ha) farm received 20% of the normal level of rainfall, which is not a lot, given that Utah is the second-driest state in the country behind Nevada. State agriculture officials estimate crop yields are down by 20% across the 18,400 farms in Utah. Water allotments were reduced by up to 75%, the deciding factors being how much moisture river drainages received and what kind of water right was in place (known as "first in time, first in right"). Wade Eliason said his talks with fellow farmers and ranchers has, on occasion, touched on the risk of suicide.

Newton farmer ValJay Rigby is a dry farmer, which means he is completely reliant on nature to water his crops. He dry farms 1,300 acres (530 ha) and has access to irrigation water on another 300 acres (120 ha) on his Cache County land.

=== Kentucky ===
Between 2004 and 2017, over 100 Kentucky farmers died by suicide. In 2020, Joe Moore, who runs a 475-acre (192 ha) farm, in Glasgow, went to visit his neighbor who was concerned about the lack of rainfall that summer and being able to grow enough hay to feed his cattle. Moore tried to reassure him, but three days later a state trooper visited his door to inform him that his neighbor had gone missing. They found his body several hours later. He had taken his own life.

=== Vermont ===
In 1964, Romaine Tenney died by suicide after the land his farm sat on was acquired by eminent domain to build an interstate. He was born on the family farm and had only left the property for military service.

== Gender ==
In a six-year study undertaken in Oklahoma, of the 160 farmer deaths by suicide, only three were women. This ratio is reflected nationwide.

== Assistance ==
Crisis hotlines, such as Iowa Rural Concern, began to appear nationwide during the 1980s.

In 1985, Kaye Hagedorn got her husband, Dean, in touch with a counselor, who told the farmer something shocking: he wasn't alone; countless other farmers were in trouble too. "And I learned", he said, "that I may have made some mistakes, but I wasn't a failure." Conversely, there can be a stigma about being seen going to a therapist, with one example given that, if a local bank knows a farmer is seeking mental-health assistance, it may become an obstacle toward receiving a loan.

Calls to a hotline operated by Farm Aid nearly doubled, resulting in a drop in suicide rates. "Every state that had a telephone hotline reduced the number of farming-related suicides", says Mike Rosmann, an Iowan farmer-turned-psychologist. Rosmann received an average of seven calls per week in the spring of 2019 from distressed farmers. Conversely, mental-health care is often regarded as a "luxury" or an "unnecessary expense."

An organization called Sowing Seeds of Hope (SSOH), formed in Wisconsin, connected uninsured and underinsured farmers in seven Midwestern states to behavioral-health services. It ran for fourteen years, fielding approximately 500,000 calls from farmers, as well as training over 10,000 behavioral-health professionals in rural communities and providing subsidized behavioral-health resources to over 100,000 families in the farming industry. It became the blueprint for a nationwide program called the Farm and Ranch Stress Assistance Network (FRSAN). Although the program was approved as part of the 2008 United States farm bill, it was not funded.

Many American farmers live in rural areas far removed from their nearest mental-health practitioner. Urban counties in the United States average ten psychiatrists per 100,000 people, whereas those in rural areas have around three for the same number of people. "I would really give about anything to go and talk to people", said John Blaske. "If any one person thinks they are the only one in this boat, they are badly mistaken. It's like Noah's Ark. It's running over."

In 2019, John Hanson, who runs an assistance hotline in Nebraska, says that he has received calls late at night from desperate farmers, "including one sitting in his kitchen with a loaded shotgun and the lights out."

In the state of New York, NY FarmNet, a farm support group, set up suicide-prevention training after a downturn in its farmers' fortunes.

It is not just the heads of the families who have been affected. High-school students in Oklahoma revealed that there was an unwritten rule prohibiting talk of their family's financial situation outside the home. This resulted in loneliness and depression, with the assumption that their situation was unique. Their parents' stress also affected them directly, often leaving them feeling like a burden. Effects of their situations were displayed by some with disruption of the classroom, while others endured "almost catatonic depression". They did want to talk; they wanted to talk to each other about their experiences.

One young woman described her intense feeling of relief and almost joy when she finally decided to tell her best friend about her family's financial trouble. She discovered that her friend's family was in the same predicament. Talking, she said, helped her feel less alone.

— Eric Ramírez-Ferrero, Troubled Fields: Men, Emotions, and the Crisis in American Farming (2005)

As the 52nd executive order signed since his taking office in January 2021, president Joe Biden wanted farmers to have the right to repair equipment and to access to retail markets. The order looked to broaden competition in several agricultural areas:

- a review of the Packers and Stockyards Act (including protection for whistleblowers regarding infringements of the act)
- more funds for meat processing
- transparency in food labeling and contracts

The National Farmers Union (NFU) called these anti-concentration amendments a "monumental" step. "After suffering corporate abuse for so many years, it is reassuring that farmers may finally get a level playing field", NFU president Rob Larew said. "It will go a long way towards building the resilient, equitable food system that farmers and consumers deserve."

As of August 2021, if a farmer wants to sue a company for anti-competitive behavior under the act, they would need to prove the malpractice hurt not only them but the entire industry.

That creates a very high bar that the Obama rules would have lowered, but the Trump administration withdrew the rules, leaving groups like the Organization for Competitive Markets disappointed.

— Bloomberg.com, July 9, 2021

"This time seems to be different", Christopher Leonard, author of The Meat Racket, said, referring to the attempt Barack Obama made during his terms in office, albeit with the same Agriculture Secretary (Tom Vilsack). "There is a groundswell of support for antitrust reforms on both the left and right in Congress. If a program like this could ever get implemented, it seems like now is the best time in the past 20 years."

The United Food and Commercial Workers International Union (UFCW), which represents over one million workers in the food, healthcare and pharmacy industries, said the order was a "strong step to support American workers".

President of the American Farm Bureau Federation (AFBF), Zippy Duvall, said that the group would study the order's details and would work with the administration "to ensure changes are consistent with our grassroots policy, and farmers and ranchers are provided greater flexibility to remain competitive in our growing economy."

In addition, the USDA announced a plan to invest around $500 million to increase the capacity of meat-processing, with the aim of giving farmers, ranchers and consumers more choices. It also said that over $150 million will be given to existing smaller processing facilities to assist them during the COVID-19 pandemic.

In August 2021, Iowa Secretary of Agriculture Mike Naig joined forces with Iowa State University to provide funding to build an outreach program. This included a $500,000 grant to increase mental-health support to Iowan farmers. For direct assistance, Farm Family Wellness is open 24/7, while IowaCrisisChat.org offers live communication with trained health professionals daily between 9 A.M. and 2 A.M.

Two months later, U.S. Senators Jerry Moran and Roger Marshall announced $500,000 USDA Farm and Ranch Stress Assistance Network grant to the Kansas Department of Agriculture, with the aim of connecting farmers, ranchers and others in agriculture-centric occupations to mental-health resources.

Also in 2021, Michigan State University (MSU) introduced a Health & Farm Stress Extension Educator. Remington Rice will provide outreach throughout Michigan but particularly in Antrim County, Benzie County, Grand Traverse County, Kalkaska County, Leelanau County and Manistee County. Rice is the fifth generation of a farming family in Benzie County. MSU was forced to shut down the program in 2025 after funding for it was ended.

In 2021, the Minnesota Department of Agriculture distributed funds to eleven local project partners via the department's "Bend, Don't Break" scheme.

Also in 2021, Frank King, a self-described "mental-health" comedian who has written for Jay Leno's Tonight Show, spoke to farmers and ranchers during the Montana Farm Bureau Federation convention, drawing on his personal story of depression and suicide (his grandmother and aunt killed themselves). In 2010, King filed a Chapter 7 bankruptcy and lost everything. He began making plans to take his own life, including looking over his $1-million life insurance policy. "I was worth more dead than alive", he said. King has given TED Talks on how to recognize signs of suicide and intervention methods.

The North Central Farm and Ranch Stress Assistance Center, based in Illinois, offers assistance to farmers in twelve Midwestern states. As part of its five-year study, North Central found that almost 60% of the parents in a survey of 122 farm families had at least mild symptoms of anxiety or depression. This statistic was mirrored in their children, as was the level of the depression.

Raising Hope is a partnership between the Kentucky Department of Agriculture, the Cabinet for Health and Family Services, plus various state universities. The Kentucky General Assembly has appropriated $500,000 to the support group annually.

The Wisconsin Farm Center was established in the mid-1980s. In August 2025, a month with an unusually high number of farmer suicides, they were alerted that a 14-year-old farmer had taken their own life. Wisconsin senator Tammy Baldwin (D) is seeking $10 million in the 2023 farm bill, to support an Agricultural Department stress-assistance network. It is the same total authorized in the 2018 bill. It is hoped that Congress will increase the network's funding to $15 million annually via the farm bill, as well as making it permanent. A telephone number, separate from the 988 Suicide and Crisis Lifeline, specifically for agricultural workers, is also being requested.

Kaila Anderson, a native of rural Sabetha, Kansas, founded LandLogic Model, which uses farmers' relationships to their land to identify and treat depression, anxiety and other emotional issues within a hard-to-reach population. LandLogic draws heavily on cognitive behavioral therapy.

Weeks before the 2026 midterms, President Trump promised farmers $15 billion in financial assistance, with another $13.8 billion going to eligible producers for the 2025 crop year, offsetting shortfalls for farmers who grow key crops such as corn, soybeans, wheat and rice.

== See also ==
- Farmers' suicides in Canada
- Farmers' suicides in India
- Farmers' suicides in western Odisha
