= Agricultural recession =

Time of low crop prices and low farm incomes

An agricultural recession describes a period of low crop prices and sharply reduced farm incomes. Consequences may include second order effects such as rural flight of people to towns and also had political effects.

A common feature of agricultural recessions, in contrast to famines and crop failure, is a link to market conditions, such as the opening up of new areas of production or crops reaching markets previously protected, either by transport costs, or a war blockade (as after the Napoleonic and First World Wars).

== Examples ==
An early agricultural recession was the Post-Napoleonic Depression where British agriculture was faced with cheap grain from Europe as Continental producers could freely export grain after two decades. This led to the introduction of the Corn Laws to protect farmers.

The Great depression of British agriculture, which had parallels in other European countries like France and Italy, was largely as a result of globalization as railways and steam ships together with some farm mechanisation meant that fertile but sparsely populated areas such as the Great Plains and Ukraine could now export grain far further from harvest to market without it rotting.

After the First World War there were agricultural recessions, most deeply in the United States, but in many other countries both traditional exporters like Australia but also in traditional importers like France.

The 1980s farm crisis in the USA was more localized as the strong dollar, high oil prices and the grain embargo against the Soviet Union conspired to raise farming costs and lower grain prices.
