= Farm crisis =

Time of agricultural recession, low crop prices and low farm incomes

A farm crisis is an American term for a time of agricultural recession, low crop prices and low farm incomes. The Interwar farm crisis was an extended period of depressed agricultural incomes from the end of the First to the start of the Second World War. The most recent US farm crisis occurred during the 1980s.
