= Statz (surname) =

Statz is a surname. Notable people with the surname include:

- Brenda Statz (born 1963), American mental-health activist
- Georg Statz (1894–1945), German taxonomist
- Jigger Statz (1897–1988), American professional baseball player
- K. A. Statz, American author
- Nick Statz (born 1996), Canadian football player
- Vincenz Statz (1819–1898), German architect
