= 1980s farm crisis =

Agricultural recession in the United States

The United States experienced a major farm crisis during the 1980s due to economic conditions. The crisis had reached its peak in the mid-1980s, resulting in numerous foreclosures and ultimately rural flight.

== Background ==
American farmers in the 20th century tended to over-produce crops compared to the prices the crops could sell for, leading to an effect known as a "cost-price squeeze" where the income received did not meet the cost of production. Farming in the mid-twentieth century was becoming increasingly mechanized, which reduced the cost of labor. However, the 1973 oil crisis increased the cost of fuel, further depressing the net income of farmers. In an attempt to curtail the grain surplus, the US signed the 1973 United States–Soviet Union wheat deal. The period between 1973-1974 saw the prices of crops double or triple.

With low interest rates and rising costs of increasingly profitable agricultural land, many farmers took out loans to purchase more land. As farmers began to increase production, profits again decreased, and farmers frequently borrowed against their land equity to keep operations running.

== Crisis ==
The late 1970s were marked by severe inflation. To address this, the Federal Reserve enacted contractionary monetary policy, which resulted in the federal funds rate reaching a high of 20% and interest rates on loans to reach 21.5%. The Soviet Union's invasion of Afghanistan in December 1979 prompted the United States to impose a a grain embargo against the Soviet Union in 1980, causing grain exports to drop by 20%. This further lowered the prices of commodities and farmland. In Iowa, farmland lost 60% of its value between 1981 and 1986. As farmers no longer had collateral for their loans, many farms and homes went into foreclosure. The effects of the crisis were generally not felt until 1984, when grass-roots movements such as Farm Aid were established to halt foreclosures.

Agricultural banks felt the impact of the crisis. The Farm Credit System experienced large losses, the first since the Great Depression. Farm debt for land and equipment purchases soared during the 1970s and early 1980s, doubling between 1978 and 1984. Bank failures rose from ten in 1981, only one of which was an agricultural bank, to 62 in 1985, of which agricultural banks accounted for over half. By the end of the decade, approximately 300,000 farmers had defaulted on loans.

== Aftermath ==
The Food Security Act of 1985, Chapter 12 bankruptcy in 1986, and the Agricultural Credit Act of 1987 were enacted by Congress to mitigate the damage caused by the crisis. Also in 1985, Farm Aid concerts began in an effort to protect family farmers from foreclosure. Later, the 1988–1990 North American drought increased commodity prices to a sustainable level.

The height of the crisis resulted in increased rural flight, an increased number of suicides, a decline in retail sales, a decrease in live births, and an acceleration of the shift from many small farms to few large farms. Over time, the crisis would contribute to the on-going depopulation of the Great Plains.

The crisis is often cited for aiding the rise of the patriot movement in the early 1990s.
