= Sidra Capital =

- Company type: Private
- Industry: Investment bank
- Founded: 2009; 16 years ago
- Website: sidracapital.com

Sidra Capital is a Saudi Arabian investment bank and asset management company headquartered in Saudi Arabia and is licensed by the Saudi Arabian Capital Market Authority. The company provides and offers vast portfolio of services including corporate finance and advisory, investment banking and real estate. It is a pioneer of private Islamic finance in Saudi Arabia.

== Corporate history ==
The company was founded in 2009. The company has established offices in Riyadh, London, Singapore and Dubai. Sidra Capital has predominantly engaged in the real estate development in both the Middle East and European regions. Sidra also provided consultancy for two mixed-use real estate developments in Saudi Arabia.

In 2014, Sidra Capital began its debt conversion transaction for the Ivory Coast-based real estate developer, OPES Holdings. Sidra Capital collaborated with Switzerland-based company INOKS Capital to facilitate the delivery of hybrid debt-equity financing to OPES Holdings for the purpose of construction of 441 units of social housing in Abidjan, Nigeria. Sidra Capital also began its real estate development in the United Arab Emirates with the project titled Project Phonenix estimating roughly around 450 million Dirhams. The Jamestown Group sold the adjoining office building of the Madison Hotel (Washington, D. C.) to Sidra Capital for a whopping $35 million in 2016.

In October 2022, Sidra Capital completed the acquisition of The Bower and a fund managed by the Clearbell Capital for around 74 million pounds. In June 2023, Sidra Capital announced that it is planning to acquire London Square for worth 40 million pounds equivalent to US$51 million.
