= Farmer Angel Network =

American nonprofit organization

- Founded: 2019 (7 years ago)
- Founders: Dorothy Harms, Randy Roecker and Brenda Statz
- Type: 501(c)(3)
- Purpose: Farmer to farmer suicide prevention
- Location: Wisconsin
- Origins: Founded in 2019, a year after the death of Statz's husband, Leon, from suicide
- Region served: Wisconsin
- Method: Mental-health wellness advocacy
- Website: www.farmerangelnetwork.com

Farmer Angel Network is an American nonprofit organization, based in Wisconsin, known for its advocacy of mental health wellness in farmers and its focus as an anti-suicide initiative. The company was founded in 2019, a year after the suicide of Leon Statz, the 57-year-old farmer husband of Brenda Statz. She is one of the company's three co-founders, alongside Statz's friend Dorothy Harms and her neighbor Randy Roecker. Harms is also the board president.

The company has a suicide and crisis lifeline telephone number, which can be used to call or text, and a 24/7 farmer wellness helpline.

The company has three chapters: South Central Wisconsin, Southwest Wisconsin and Western Wisconsin.

== See also ==
- Farmers' suicides in the United States
