= Romaine Tenney =

American farmer

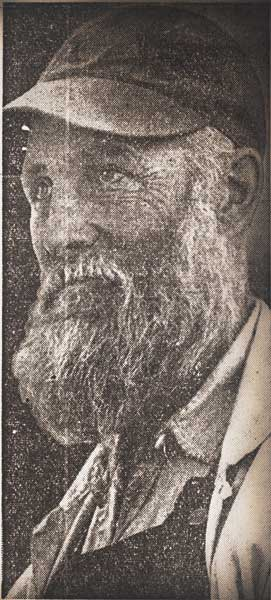
- Romaine Tenney in 1964
- Born: September 6, 1900
- Died: September 12, 1964 (aged 64)
- Cause of death: Suicide
- Occupation: Farmer

Romaine Tenney (September 6, 1900 - September 12, 1964) was an American farmer, known for committing suicide to protest the seizure of his farm by eminent domain to construct Interstate 91. Instead of waiting for bulldozers to tear down his home and farm buildings, Tenney burned them down himself. He then nailed himself shut in his bedroom and shot himself, his body burning with his house.

== Early life ==
Romaine Tenney was born in 1900, the fourth of nine children of Myron and Rosa Tenney. His father died when he was 14, leaving his mother to raise the family and run the farm. He left the family farm only once for an extended period, to serve in the military.

== Death ==
In the early morning hours of September 12, 1964, Tenney released his animals, set fire to his barns and shed, and ultimately barricaded himself inside his burning farmhouse. It was later determined he died from a self-inflicted gunshot wound before the flames claimed him.

== Legacy ==
=== Park ===
The Romaine Tenney Memorial Park is located at the I-91 Exit 8 park-and-ride in Ascutney, Vermont. The park features a picnic pavilion and the stump of the last large maple tree from Tenney's farm, which was cut down on March 17, 2021, due to poor health. The park was built with a $30,000 grant from the Vermont Agency of Transportation.

=== In remembrance ===
Tenney's life has been the inspiration for songs, books, and poetry.

- "Spark" by Ben Fuller
- "Romaine Tenney" by Dan Lindner
- A poem by Neil Shepard
- "Love of the Land" by Travis Van Alstyne
- ”Romaine Tenney” (song) by Andy Davis

== See also ==
- Farmers' suicides in the United States
