= National Rural Health Association =

US nonprofit organization

- Formation: 1978
- Type: Professional association
- Headquarters: Kansas City, Missouri, and Washington, D.C.
- Location: United States
- Origins: National Rural Primary Care Association, American Small and Rural Hospital Association, and American Rural Hospital Association
- Region served: Health care
- Members: Approximately 18,000
- Website: www.ruralhealth.us

The National Rural Health Association (NRHA) is a national nonprofit professional association in the United States with more than 18,000 members. The association's mission is to provide leadership on rural health issues, which it attempts to carry out through education, communication, and advocacy. The NRHA membership is made up of a diverse collection of individuals and organizations, all of whom share the common bond of an interest in rural health. Many member organizations have specific facility designations such as critical access hospitals, rural health clinics, or community health centers.

== History ==
In the mid to late 1970s, a small group of rural community health centers began to coalesce around the need for an independent association to make sure the rural-specific needs of the community health center movement was represented. In 1978, the National Rural Primary Care Association (NRPCA) was founded and based in Waterville, Maine. The NRPCA moved its headquarters to Kansas City, Missouri, in 1983, where it remains today.

In the early 1980s two additional rural health associations were formed with similar desires to represent the rural-specific needs within their larger professional groups. The American Rural Health Association (ARHA) was formed in 1980 primarily made up of rural health researchers. The goal of the ARHA was to "become a definitive source of information on rural health." In February 1981, the American Small and Rural Hospital Association (ASRHA) was formed.

In 1984, the Board of the NRPCA changed the association's name to the National Rural Health Care Association (NRHCA). In doing so, the association moved past its mainly community health center roots and allowed other providers as segments of its membership. This change prepared the way for the NRHCA to eventually merge with both the ARHA and the ASRHA. These mergers took place in 1987 and 1986, respectively. These mergers led to a change of the name to the National Rural Health Association, a "new unified voice for rural health."

NRHA's roots in professional-specific rural organizations has led to a membership structure that contains specific constituency groups for different rural health interests. For example, student members of NRHA are invited to join the student constituency group. These constituencies within the association each have seats on the NRHA board of trustees and its policy setting body. Many also have their own conference or tracks within larger NRHA conferences.

== See also ==
- Farmers' suicides in the United States
- Rural areas in the United States
