= Madison Hotel (Washington, D.C.) =

Hotel in Washington, D.C., U.S.

Le Méridien Washington, D.C., The Madison
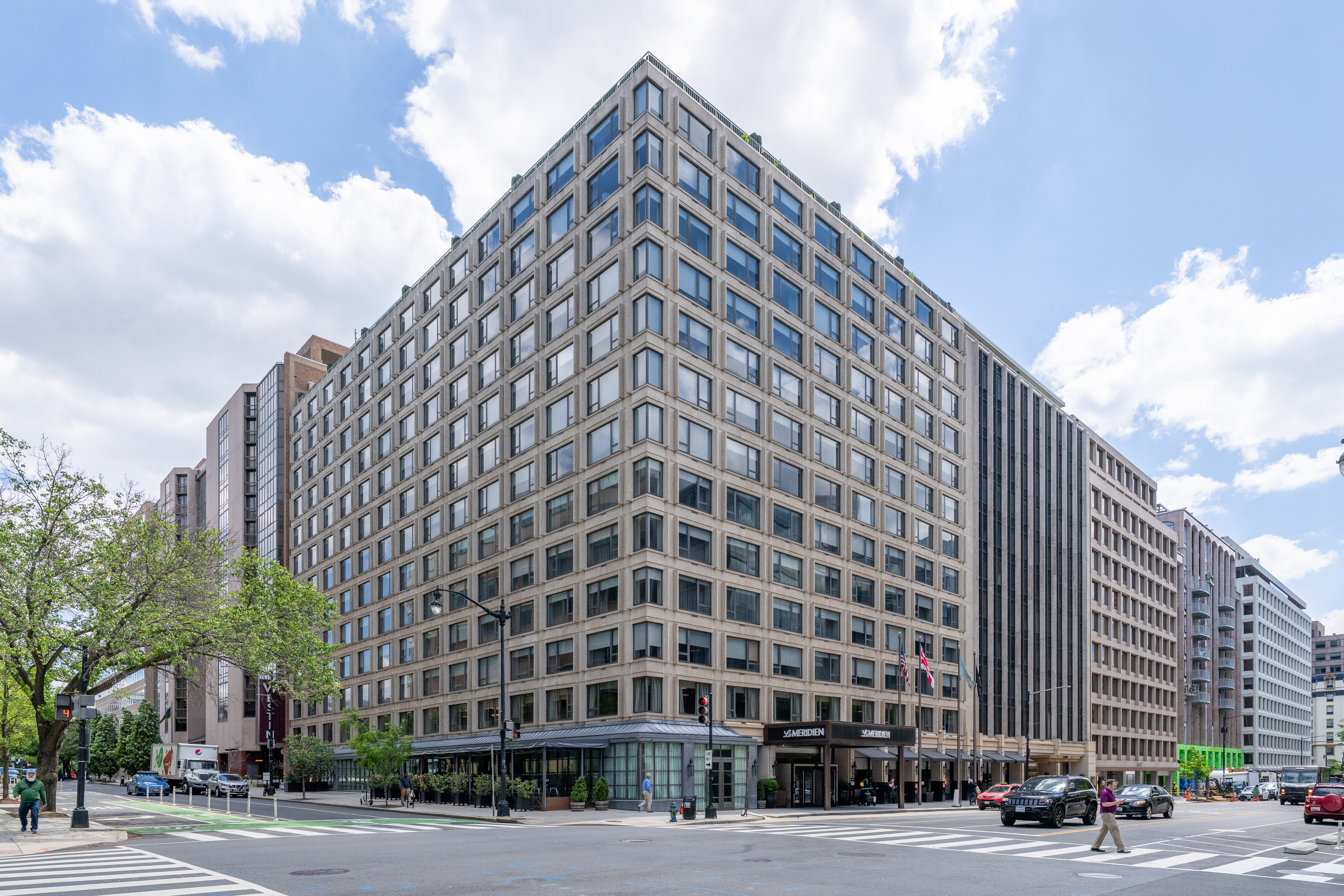
- Le Méridien Washington, D.C., The Madison photographed in 2026.
- Interactive map of the Le Méridien Washington, D.C., The Madison area

General information
- Location: Washington, D.C., 1177 Fifteenth St. NW
- Coordinates: 38°54′19″N 77°2′2″W
- Opening: 1963
- Owner: Crescent Real Estate
- Operator: HEI Hotels & Resorts

Other information
- Number of rooms: 356
- Number of suites: 49

Website
- Le Méridien Washington, D.C., The Madison

Le Méridien Washington, D.C., The Madison is a luxury hotel in Washington, D.C., built in 1963.

== History ==
The Madison was constructed by developer Marshall Coyne, along with the adjoining 100,000 sq ft Madison Office Building. The hotel was opened in February 1963, by President John F. Kennedy. When opened, it was Washington's first modern luxury hotel, with rooms renting at the then-unheard-of rate of $27 a night. In 1978, Coyne opened the Dolley Madison Hotel across M Street from the main hotel. The 42-room Dolley Madison operated as an ultra-luxury adjunct to The Madison until 1988, when Coyne sold it and it was demolished for construction of an office building.

Loews Hotels assumed management of the hotel in April 2006, and it was renamed The Madison, A Loews Hotel. The hotel and its adjoining office building were sold to the Jamestown Group in January 2011 for $123 million, and Destination Hotels & Resorts assumed management from Loews, returning the hotel to its original name. The group renovated the property in 2012 at a cost of $22 million. Loews Corp approached the Jamestown Group and offered to buy the hotel, and the sale was completed for approximately $145 million in December 2012, with Jamestown retaining the office building. The hotel rejoined the Loews chain in January 2013, becoming the Loews Madison Hotel. Jamestown sold the adjoining office building to Saudi investment bank Sidra Capital for $35 million in 2016.

In September 2017, Loews sold the hotel to Walton Street Capital for $72.5 million. The Washington Business Journal reported that the actual sales price was likely higher, since the sale of the building did not include the price of intangible assets. Walton Street Capital retained Hilton Hotels & Resorts to manage the hotel, which was rebranded as The Madison Washington DC, a Hilton Hotel. Walton Street Capital sold the hotel to AllianceBernstein in October 2020 for $65.3 million. The hotel left Hilton on March 31, 2022, joining Marriott International as The Madison Hotel, and planned to convert it into Marriott International's Le Meridien Hotels & Resorts brand. The following day, on April 1, 2022, the hotel's sale to Fort Worth-based Crescent Real Estate for $61.2 million was announced. On September 23, 2024, at the completion of a $15 million renovation, the hotel joined Marriott's Le Méridien brand and was renamed Le Méridien Washington, D.C., The Madison.

== Rating ==
The AAA gave the hotel four diamonds out of five in 2012. The hotel has maintained that rating every year, and received four diamonds again for 2016. Forbes Travel Guide (formerly known as Mobil Guide) declined to give the hotel five stars in 2016, nor did the hotel make its "recommended" list.
