= Brenda Statz =

American mental-health activist

- Born: Brenda M. Farber; May 11, 1963 (age 63)
- Occupation: Mental-health activist
- Known for: Co-founding the Farmer Angel Network
- Spouse: Leon A. Statz (m. 1984–2018; his death)
- Website: https://www.farmerangelnetwork.com

Brenda M. Statz (née Farber; born May 11, 1963) is an American mental-health activist. After the death of her husband, a farmer, from suicide, she co-founded the Farmer Angel Network, a support group for local families in the farming industry.

== Background ==
In October 2018, Leon A. Statz, a 57-year-old farmer from Loganville, Wisconsin, committed suicide after financial struggles forced him to sell the fifty Holstein dairy cows he had on his 200-acre (81 ha) farm, instead moving into grain and beef farming. The relative uncertainty of their new venture caused Statz endless anxiety, even though the farm was actually prospering. Statz, who had inherited the family farm from his parents, began a part-time role as a meat cutter in a local grocery store―his wife of 34 years, Brenda, later saying it was to punish himself because he thought he was a failure. Statz attempted suicide four months after the sale of the cows. He said goodbye to his children over the telephone, then swallowed a handful of pills while locking himself in a shed with farm equipment running inside it. His suicide note read: "I wish I never sold (our, my) cows! I'm a dairy farmer. I want my old life back, but I can't get it anymore. Every thing I do fails. I didn't plan ahead for this ... I really screwed up!" Brenda heard the tractor equipment running and shut them down, despite her husband's attempts to prevent her doing so. She opened the shed's door, to let air pass through, and called the police and Rev. Donald Glanzer Jr., the pastor of their church, St. Peter's Lutherhan in Loganville. Statz was hospitalized for three days.

Ethan Statz found his father's body in the shed for the farm's heifers on October 8, 2018. In 2023, Statz's wife, his sons and his daughter-in-law were running the farm. They family later formed Statz Circle S Farms LLC, raising beef cattle and crops.

== Farmer Angel Network ==
As a direct result of the incident, in 2019, Statz, Dorothy Harms and Randy Roecker, a neighboring farmer, set up Farmer Angel Network, a support group for local families in the farming industry. Brenda has trained with SafeTALK on has been educated on QPR (Question, Persuade, Refer).

== See also ==
- Farmers' suicides in the United States
