= 1973 United States–Soviet Union wheat deal =

Large Soviet purchases of U.S. grain negotiated in 1972 and delivered into 1973

The 1973 United States–Soviet Union wheat deal was a series of large Soviet purchases of American wheat and other grains. It was negotiated with private U.S. exporters during July and August 1972, with deliveries scheduled through August 1973. The Soviets contracted for about 440 million bushels of wheat (roughly US$700 million) along with additional grain purchases, tightening world supplies and contributing to sharp rises in grain and food prices in 1972–1973.

The sales were facilitated by a July 1972 U.S. government credit agreement making up to US$750 million available over three years for Soviet purchases of U.S. grains, and by export-subsidy mechanisms that supported contracting at fixed export “target” prices despite rising domestic market prices. In the United States the episode became widely known as the “Great Grain Robbery” (or “Great Russian Grain Robbery”), and Congress subsequently mandated an export sales reporting system in 1973 to improve transparency around large agricultural export transactions.

== Background ==
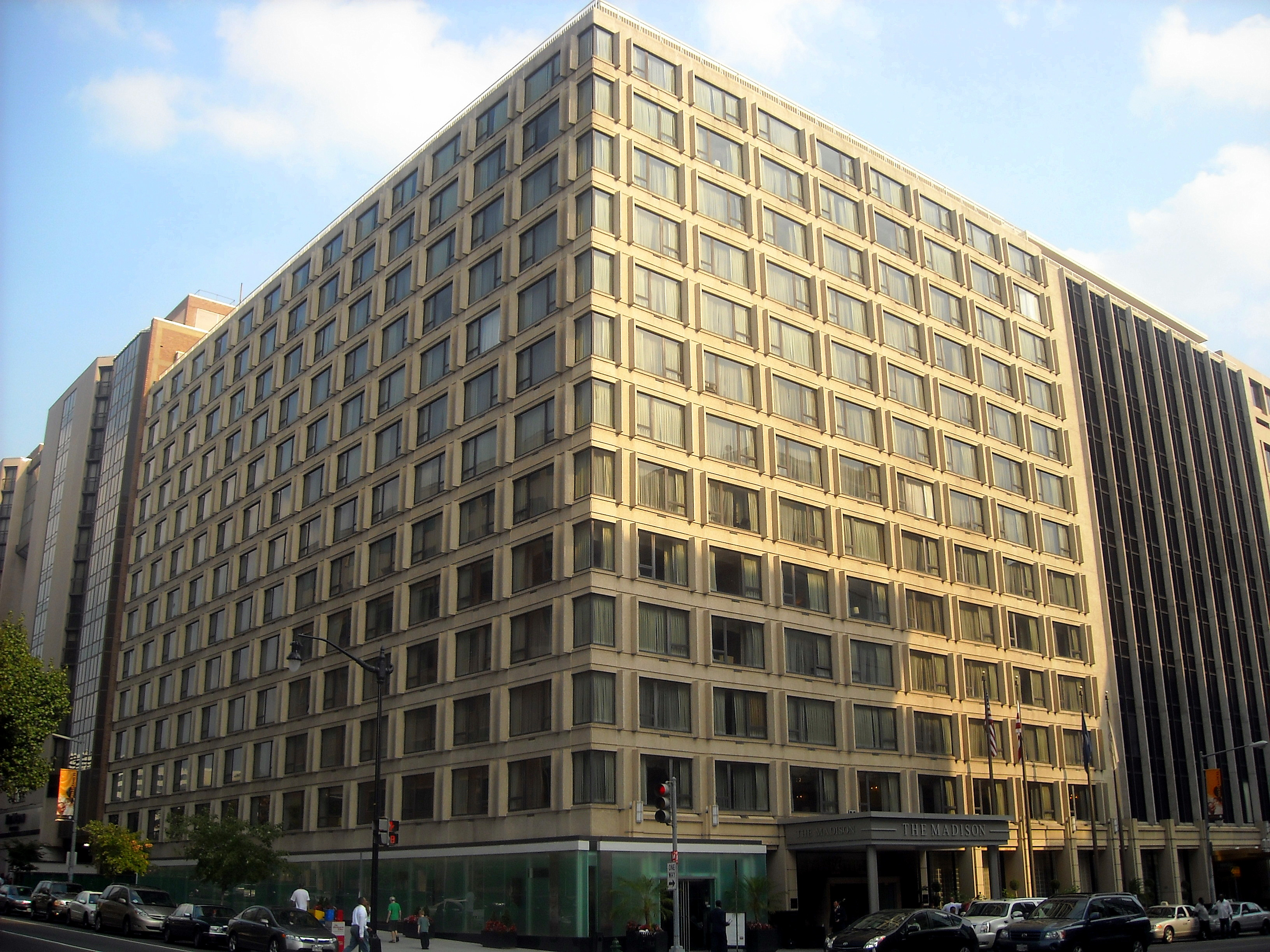
The Madison hotel in Washington, D.C., where negotiations took place

Soviet grain output was highly variable and, by the early 1970s, the USSR was increasingly supplementing domestic supplies with imports. Analysts attributed this dependence to a combination of climatic risk - much of the Soviet grain area lay in regions where precipitation and growing seasons were only marginally adequate for reliable grain production, and structural weaknesses in Soviet agriculture such as poor management, weak incentives and significant waste in the farm system.

In 1972 the USSR suffered heavy winterkill of winter grains following severe frosts with little or no snow cover, followed by a drought and unusually hot conditions over much of the European USSR during the growing season; in some areas east of the Urals, wet conditions also complicated harvesting. The USSR's reported gross output of grain and pulses in 1972 was about 168 million tonnes (bunker weight), down from 181.2 million tonnes in 1971. As crop prospects deteriorated, the Soviet government purchased roughly 28 million tonnes of grain abroad for delivery in 1972–73, including about 18 million tonnes from the United States. Contemporary analyses of the 1972–73 price spike treated the Soviet shortfall as a major factor tightening world grain markets.

Later meteorological analyses comparing major events in the region noted that the summer of 1972 produced heat extremes in parts of Eastern Europe comparable to those seen in 2010, although 2010 set new records in many station series.

== Event ==
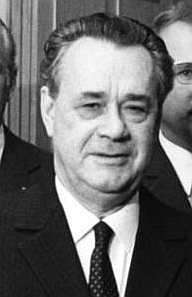
Soviet Minister of Foreign Trade Nikolai Patolichev

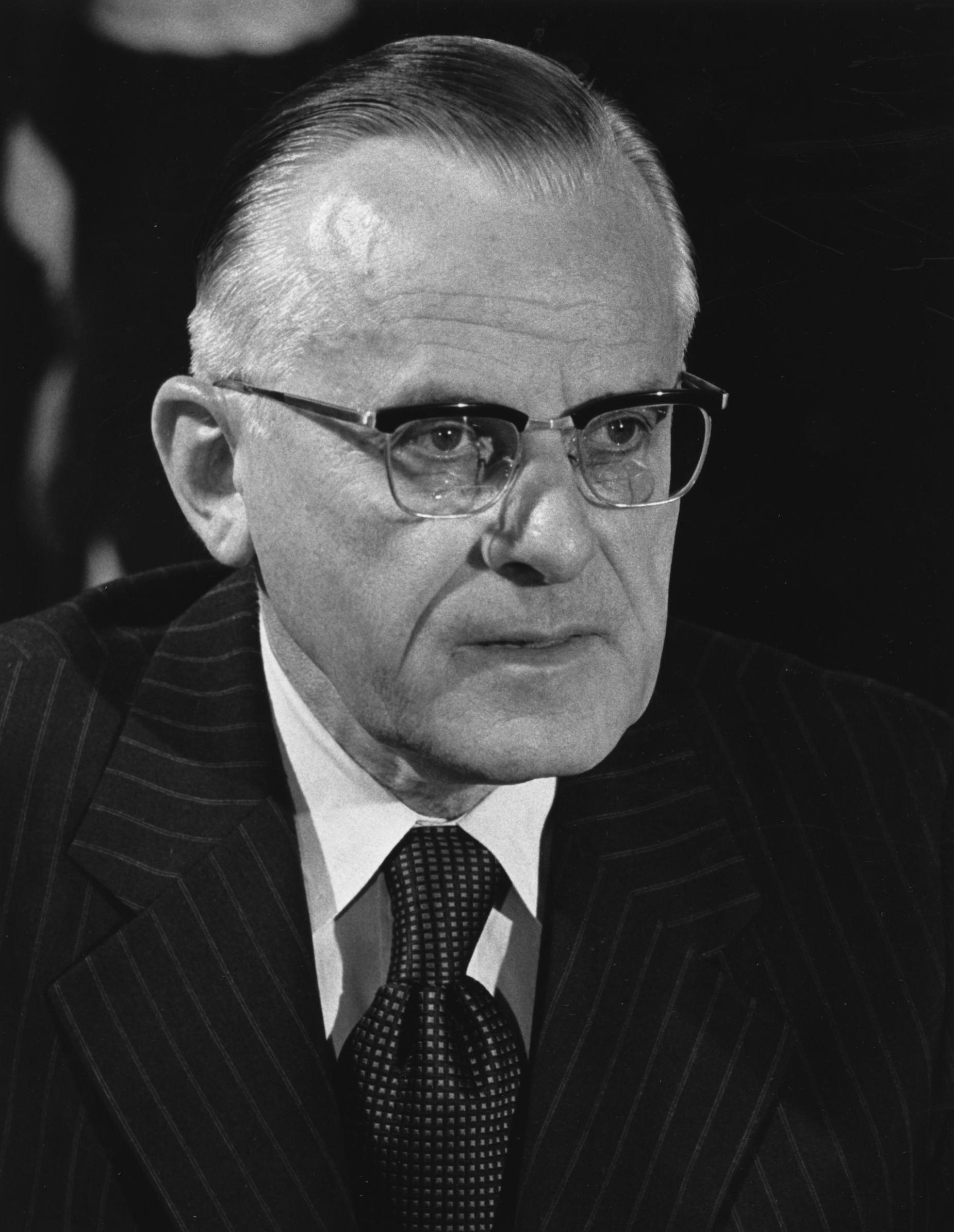
U.S. Secretary of Agriculture Earl Butz

The main negotiations for the deal took place on June 20, 1972, at The Madison hotel in Washington, D.C., with two Soviet teams, one led by foreign trade minister Nikolai Patolichev and the second led by Nicolai Belousov. On the American side were multiple representatives of American grain businesses and officials representing the U.S. government. This included Michel Fribourg, the CEO of grain trading firm ContiGroup Companies (formerly Continental Grain), and Carroll Brunthaver, the U.S. Under Secretary of Agriculture for Farm and Foreign Agricultural Services. In early July 1972, the U.S. government negotiated an arrangement that allowed the Soviets to buy up to $750 million of American grain on credit, over a three-year timespan. However, the Soviets quickly exceeded their credit limit, spending the $750 million in only one month. By September 1972, the Soviets are thought to have spent up to US$1 billion on grain from companies in the United States, and more from other countries such as France, Canada, and Australia.

The U.S. government spent $300 million subsidizing the grain purchases, still unaware that the Soviets had suffered massive crop shortfalls in 1971 and 1972. One reason the government did not realize the impact the deal would have is that many officials, such as Earl Butz, were convinced that the Soviets were purchasing the grain only to feed their livestock. By not realizing that global wheat stocks were low, and discounting reports of Soviet crop failure, the United States inadvertently contributed to domestic food prices rising, using public funds to do so.

== Aftermath and international consequences ==
Weeks after the grain deal was announced, the Earth-observing satellite Landsat 1 achieved orbit. If the satellite had launched a few months earlier, the deal may have been reconsidered or never have happened at all, because American negotiators could have realized the scale of Soviet crop failures. The event helped lead the U.S. government to seek more information about global agricultural output via infrared satellite intelligence. After the deal, many Americans were concerned about businesses having advantages in similar situations due to their early access to information.

In a ten-month span in 1973, global food prices rose by at least 30 percent and some sources claim up to 50 percent. In some British markets there was a reported 87 percent increase on the price of an 800 grams (28 oz) loaf of bread. Global wheat stocks decreased exponentially; Australia was hit the hardest with a 93 percent decrease by 1974 from 1971. Not all nations were equally hit; some, such as Canada, benefited from the deal. Canadian farmers had sold their wheat to the Canadian Wheat Board, which were able to pool stocks and sell as a collective.

Contemporary U.S. media referred to the event as "The Russian Wheat Deal" or "The Soviet Wheat Deal". The term Great Grain Robbery is a pun referring to the 1963 Great Train Robbery and it is generally accepted that it was coined by Senator Henry M. Jackson.
