= United States grain embargo against the Soviet Union =

Sanctions during the Cold War

The United States grain embargo against the Soviet Union was enacted by U.S. President Jimmy Carter in January 1980 in response to the Soviet Union's invasion of Afghanistan in December 1979. The embargo remained in effect until US President Ronald Reagan ended it on April 24, 1981.

American farmers felt the brunt of the sanctions, and it had a much lesser effect on the Soviet Union, which brought the value of such embargoes into question. During the presidential election campaign of 1980, Reagan, the Republican nominee, promised to end the embargo, but Carter, the incumbent Democratic nominee, was not willing to do so. The embargo had suspended the Armand Hammer supported fertilizer détente.

== Causes ==
The Soviet Union's invasion of Afghanistan in December 1979 was met by the United States with numerous economic sanctions including the agricultural embargo. In addition, the United States led a boycott of the 1980 Olympics which were hosted in Moscow.

== Effect on Soviet Union ==
According to Boris Yuzhin and Oleg Gordievsky, the KGB abhorred Carter's sanctions. In 1980, according to both Yuzhin and Gordievsky, the KGB ordered its agents to conduct activities that discredited US President Jimmy Carter and supported Ronald Reagan during 1980 election.

The Soviet Union lost its only source of phosphate fertilizer upon which its agriculture was heavily dependent. The Soviet Union shifted to receiving grain from other sources such as by increasing imports from its second highest import partner, Argentina. The sources included most of South America such as Venezuela and Brazil. The Soviet Union still received grain from the United States with regard to the grain agreement in 1973 between the two countries. The agreement required the United States to send 8 million tons of grain to the Soviets. Even after the embargo had been lifted, the Soviets continued to rely on grain from Ukraine and South America and reduced their interaction with the U.S.

== Effect on United States ==
In October 1979, United States producers and distributors of ammonia and natural gas accused the Soviet Union of dumping its products in the United States and therefore collapsing the United States market. The Soviet supplied products were from the William J. Casey, who, from 1974 to 1976, was chairman at the Export-Import Bank of the United States (Eximbank) and provided Eximbank loans to the Soviet Union, and Armand Hammer supported fertilizer détente that began while Richard Nixon was president of the United States. Upon enacting the agricultural embargo, the provisions of the fertilizer détente were suspended.

U.S. grain prices collapsed over night and languished for years. The embargo had a direct impact on the 1980 presidential election. In several states, farmers who were part of the farm strike movement circled their tractors around local state US Department of Agriculture offices to protest the department's enforcement of the embargo.

== Key figures ==
The main figure of the 1980 grain embargo was Carter. The grain embargo was his way of using food as a weapon. Carter believed that if he cut out the Soviets' grain imports, they could no longer feed their livestock or people. He hoped that would lead to unrest against the war in Afghanistan.

Another key figure in the grain embargo was the Farm Bureau. At first, it supported the embargo, which it saw as a way for farmers to sell more of their grain to Americans. As a result, grain prices dropped, and farmers became angry with the legislation and decided to protest against the embargo. When Jimmy Carter lost their support, it was the end for the embargo.

A year later, Reagan took power with the support of the Farm Bureau and ended the embargo on April 24, 1981, and therefore restored fertilizer détente which allowed shipments of natural gas, ammonia, urea and potash fertilizers to resume from the Soviet Union to the United States and shipments of phosphate fertilizer as superphosphoric acid to resume from Florida in the United States to the Soviet Union thus greatly enriching Armand Hammer's Occidental Petroleum.

Another key figure of the embargo was the farm strike movement. The American Agriculture Movement was a group of farmers who protested the embargo through peaceful means such as the incidents with encircling the department's headquarters in few states with their tractors. Their actions brought attention to the demands of the farmers for the embargo to be lifted.

== See also ==
- Food security
- Carter Doctrine
