= Oba's crown =

Headpiece worn by Yoruba rulers

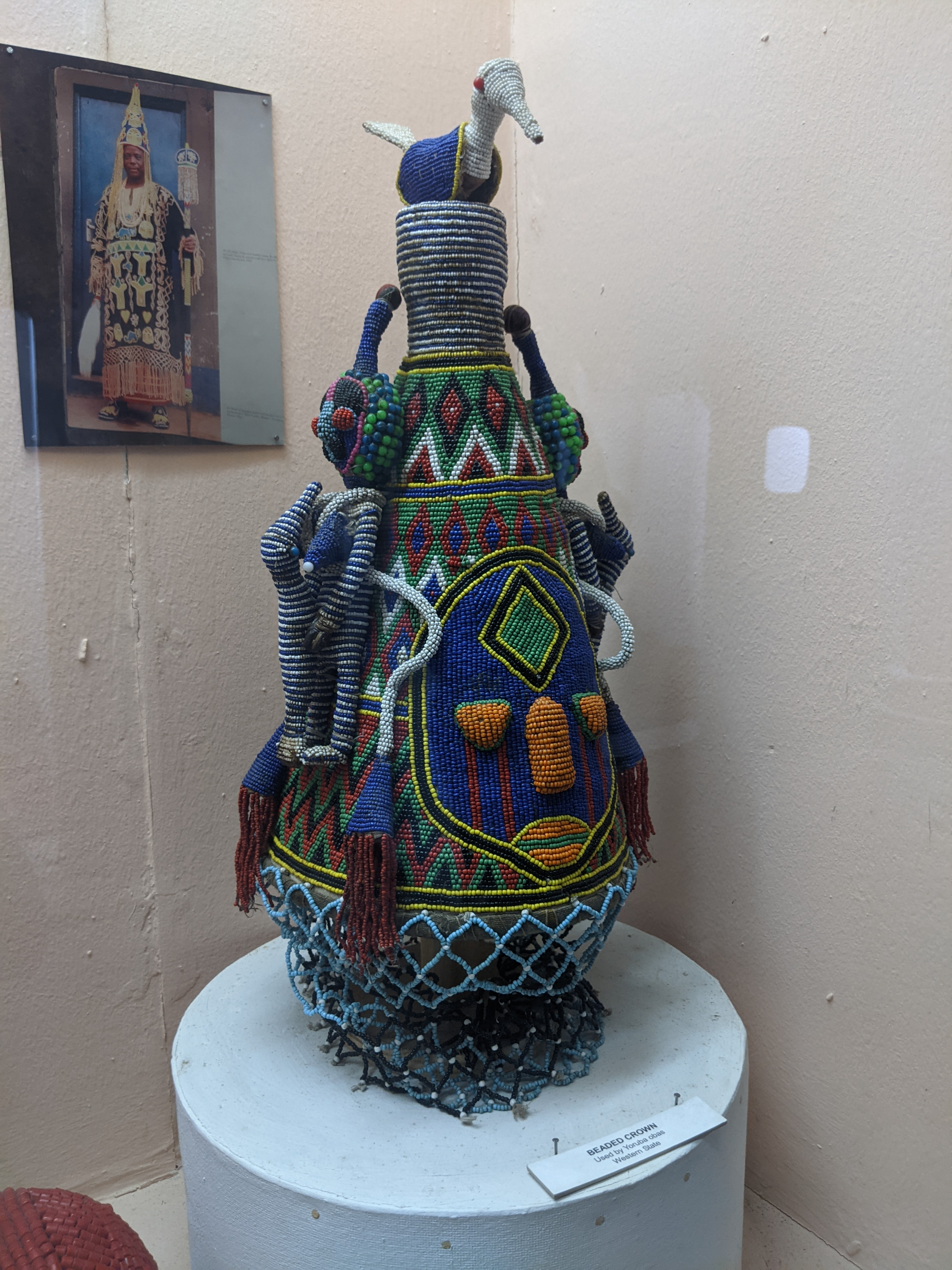
Beaded Crown

An Oba's crown represents the highest level of authority vested in Yoruba rulers, the Obas. Referred to as an Adé, the bead-embroidered crown is the foremost attribute of the ruler and the greatest mark of honour and sanction of divine authority together with the "Opa Ase" (scepter of Authority) and the Odigba/Ejigba (royal collar of beads). An Oba's crown may also be referred to as an Adé ńlá, literally: Big Crown. Ade in Yorubaland are elaborate conical head gears that feature a heavily beaded veil and fringes that shields or obscure the face.

Below the Ade are the Akoro which are smaller coronets worn by regional rulers under the suzerainty or authority of a more powerful provincial or regional Oba, or Obas who were essentially vassals under the Emperor of an empire. The titles of Oloja and Baale are two titles that are known to wear Akoro in Yorubaland rather than an Ade which they do not possess the right to wear.

In his article on the topic, Robert F. Thompson writes, "The crown incarnates the intuition of royal ancestral force, the revelation of great moral insight in the person of the king, and the glitter of aesthetic experience."

== Usage ==
Historically, after being consecrated as leader, a Yoruba Oba must not reveal his face to the public. Instead, he wears an Ade/Ade nla. Oba crowns always possess two universal feature. The first being birds atop the crown and optionally on the sides as well. The second is at least one stylized face depicted in applied beadwork on the crown and designed to identify the king when appearing in public. Many crowns have more than one face on them. Although their significance is unknown, depictions are frequently associated with Odùduwà, and suggest a shared destiny between a leader and his predecessors.

The Akoro (coronets) on the other hand often replace the birds with bird feathers rather than the whole. Crowns embody the continuity of office, regardless of who may hold it at a particular point in time. Faces may also be depicted on other forms of royal regalia, which indicates the omnipotent, all-seeing power of the monarch and his capacity to provide good leadership.

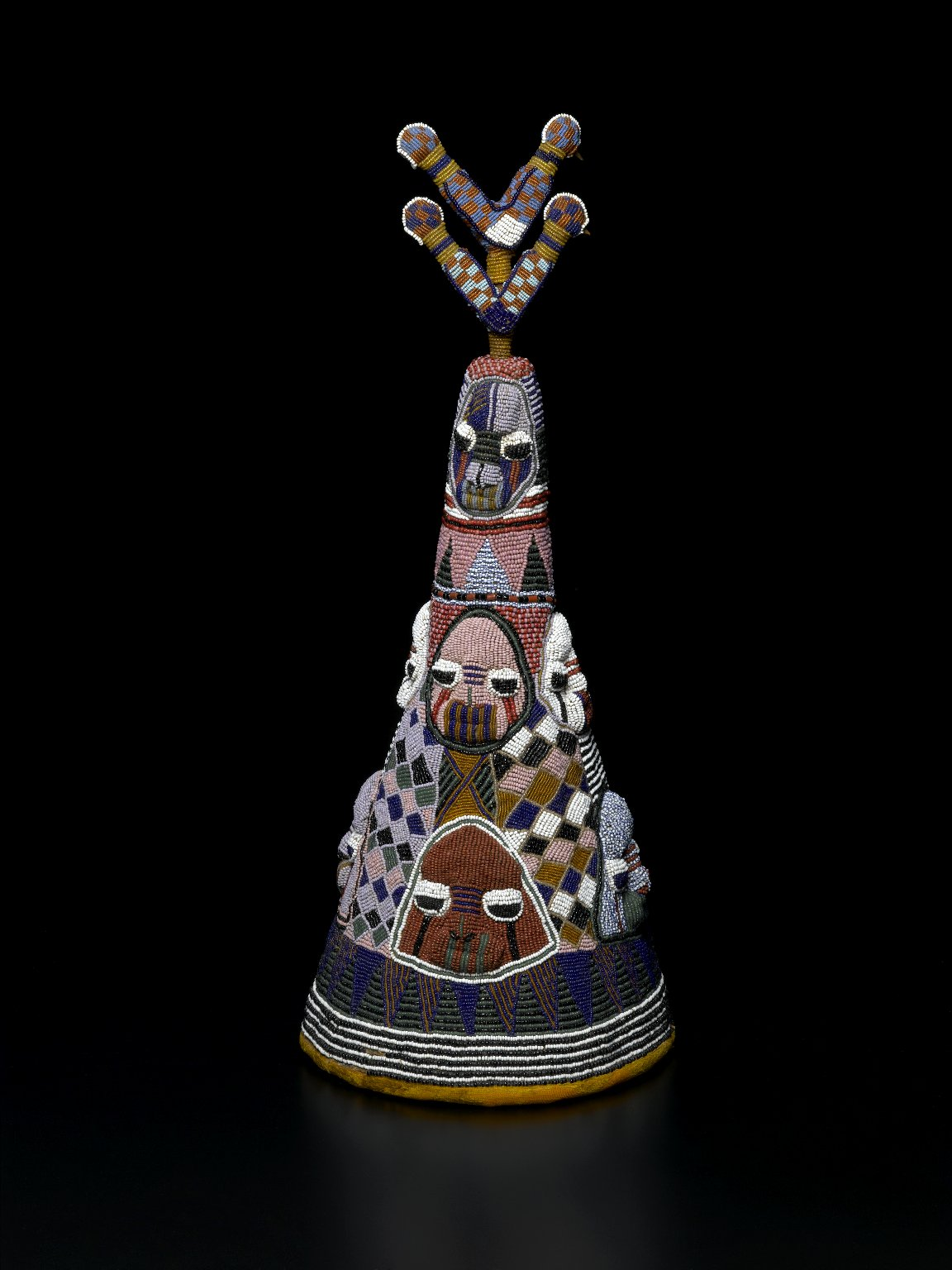
Beaded Crown (Ade) of Onijagbo Obasoro Alowolodu; late 19th century (1890); basketry frame covered by a stiffened cloth base which is embroidered with glass beads: white, blue, green, pink, red-orange, ochre, and violet; Brooklyn Museum (New York City)

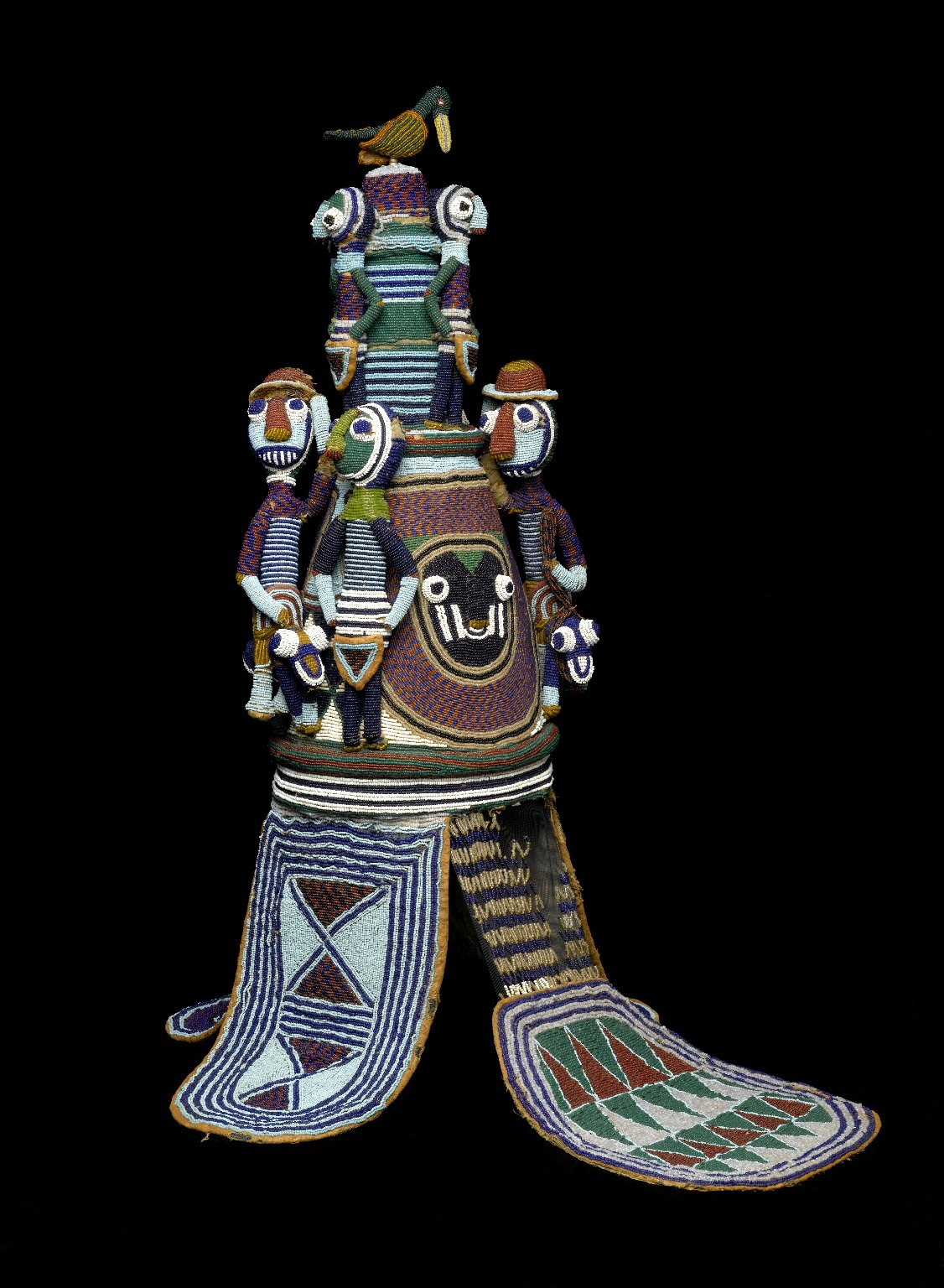
Beaded Crown (Ade) of Onijagbo Obasoro Alowolodu, Ogoga of Ikere; 1890; basketry frame, covered with beaded cloth; Brooklyn Museum

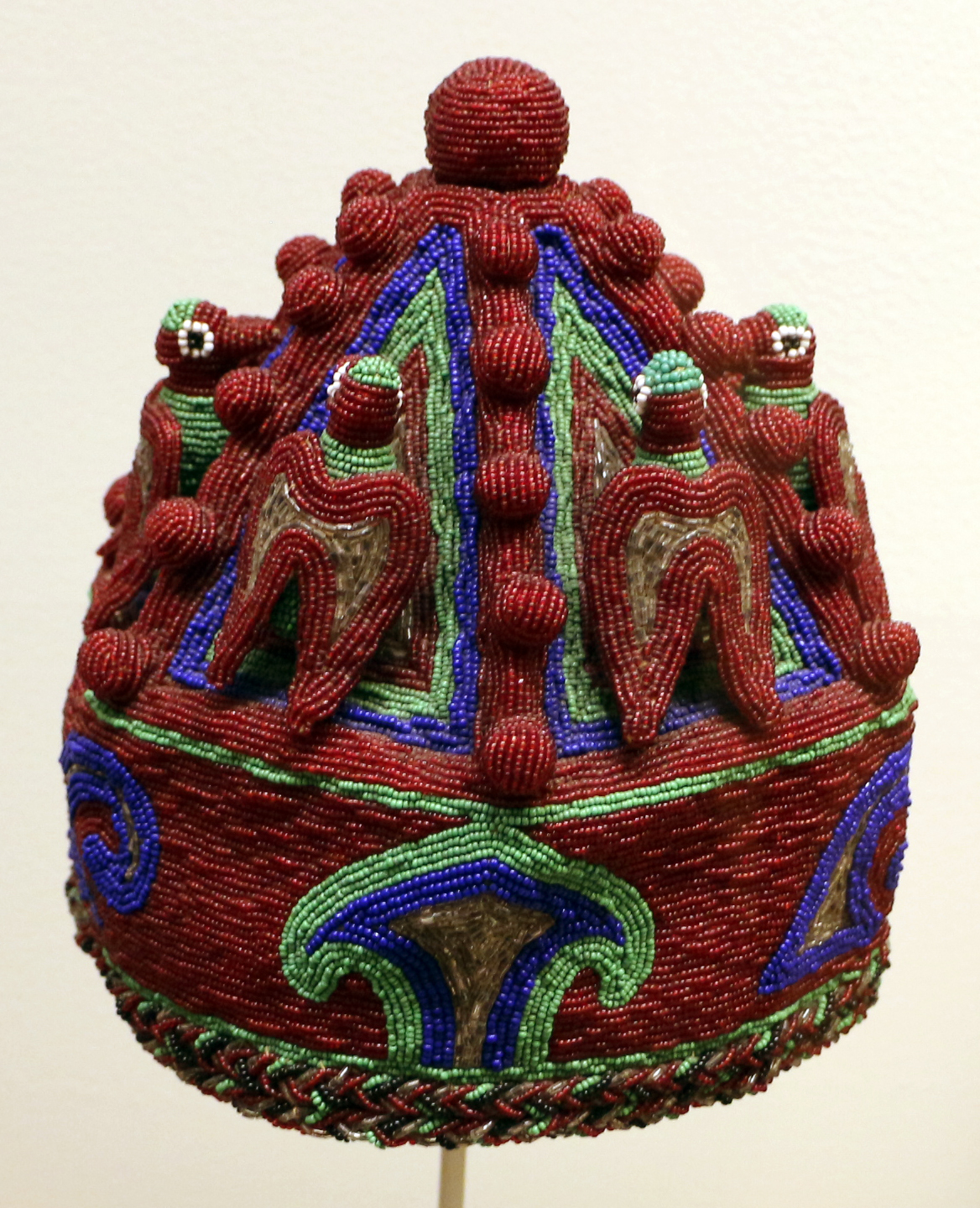
An example of a beaded royal coronet, (Akoro), Indianapolis Museum of Art. The Akoro was usually smaller than an Adé, fringeless and was usually worn by lesser ranking kings, nobles and community leaders under powerful regional Obas.

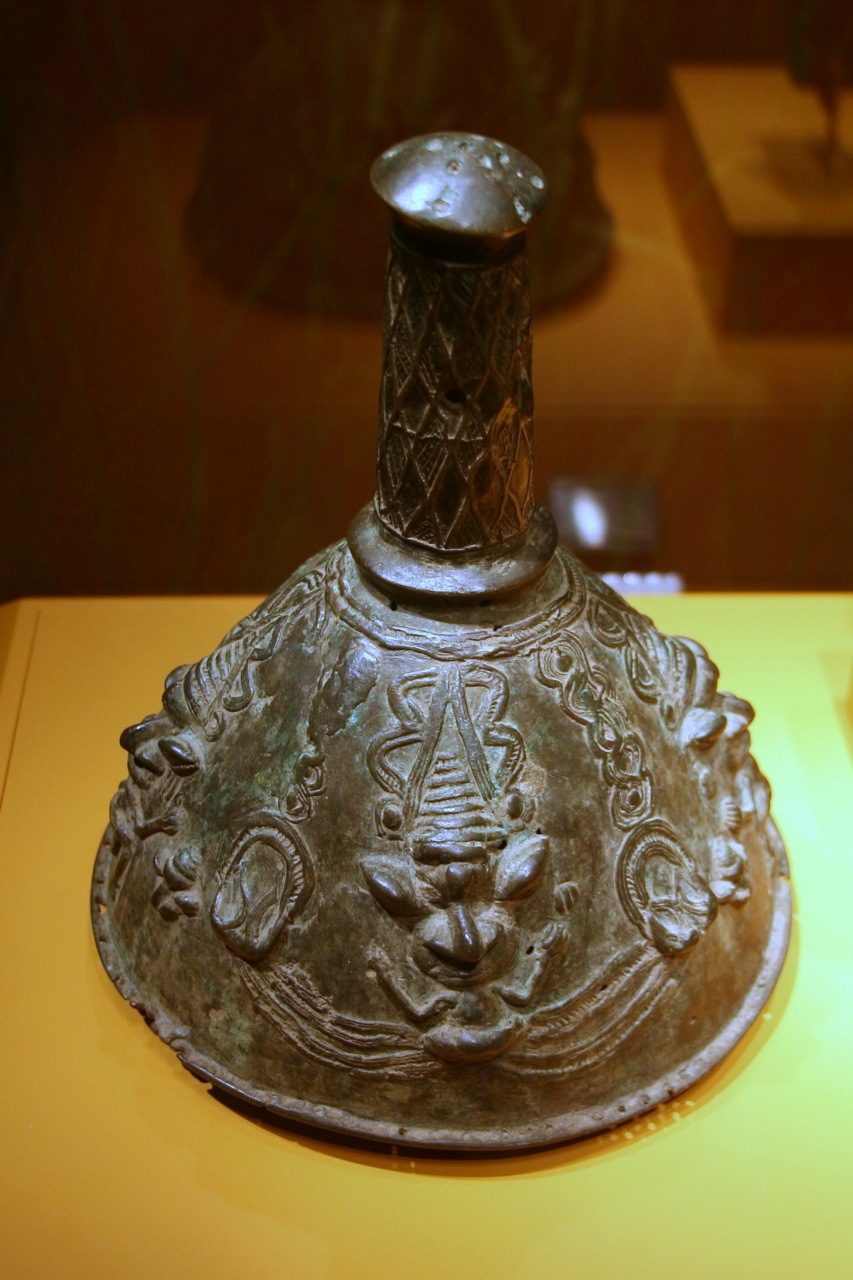
Yoruba 19th century copper alloy (brass) crown from Iperu following the typical Yoruba stem on cone ancestral crown designs. These crowns are used in the veneration of the paternal ancestors of Iperu (Ijebu) kings. The four staring faces represent the all-seeing gods or ancestors. Their protruding eyes signify when the spiritual eye replaces ordinary vision. The two figures with mudfish legs refer to supernatural powers in two realms, land and water, or reality and spirit.

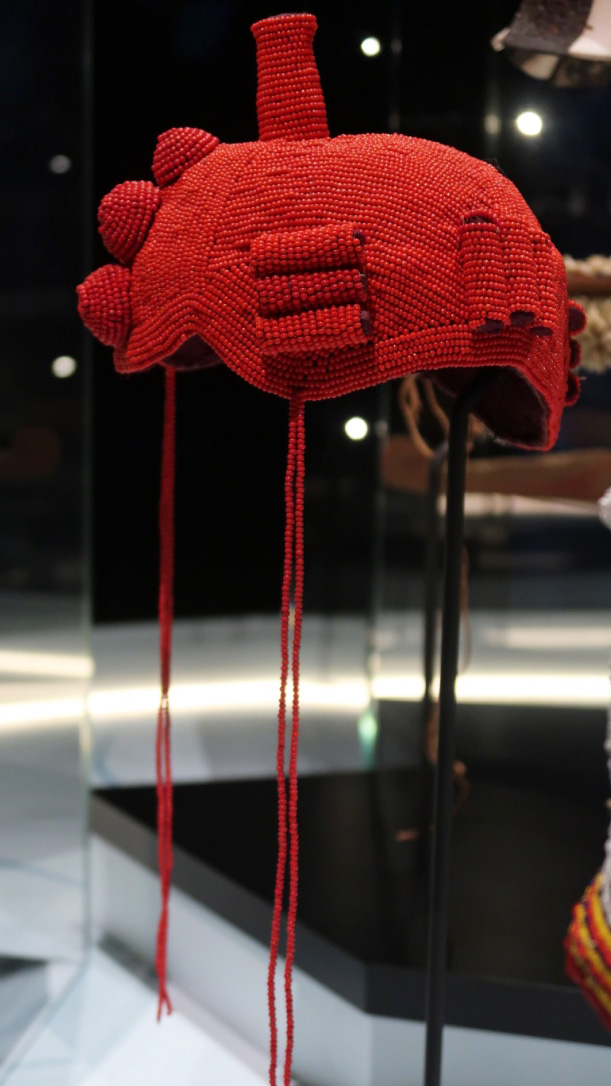
Royal headdress called Orikogbofo were much lighter versions of ancestral crowns, which were often heavy and cumbersome. The orikogbofo fulfilled the function of keeping the Oba's head always covered, for it was taboo for an Oba to be seen bare headed. This style is now popular across southern Nigeria worn by various royals in the region. Remnant tassels of a beaded veil that should completely shield the Oba's face has been extensively reduced to a few convenient strings.

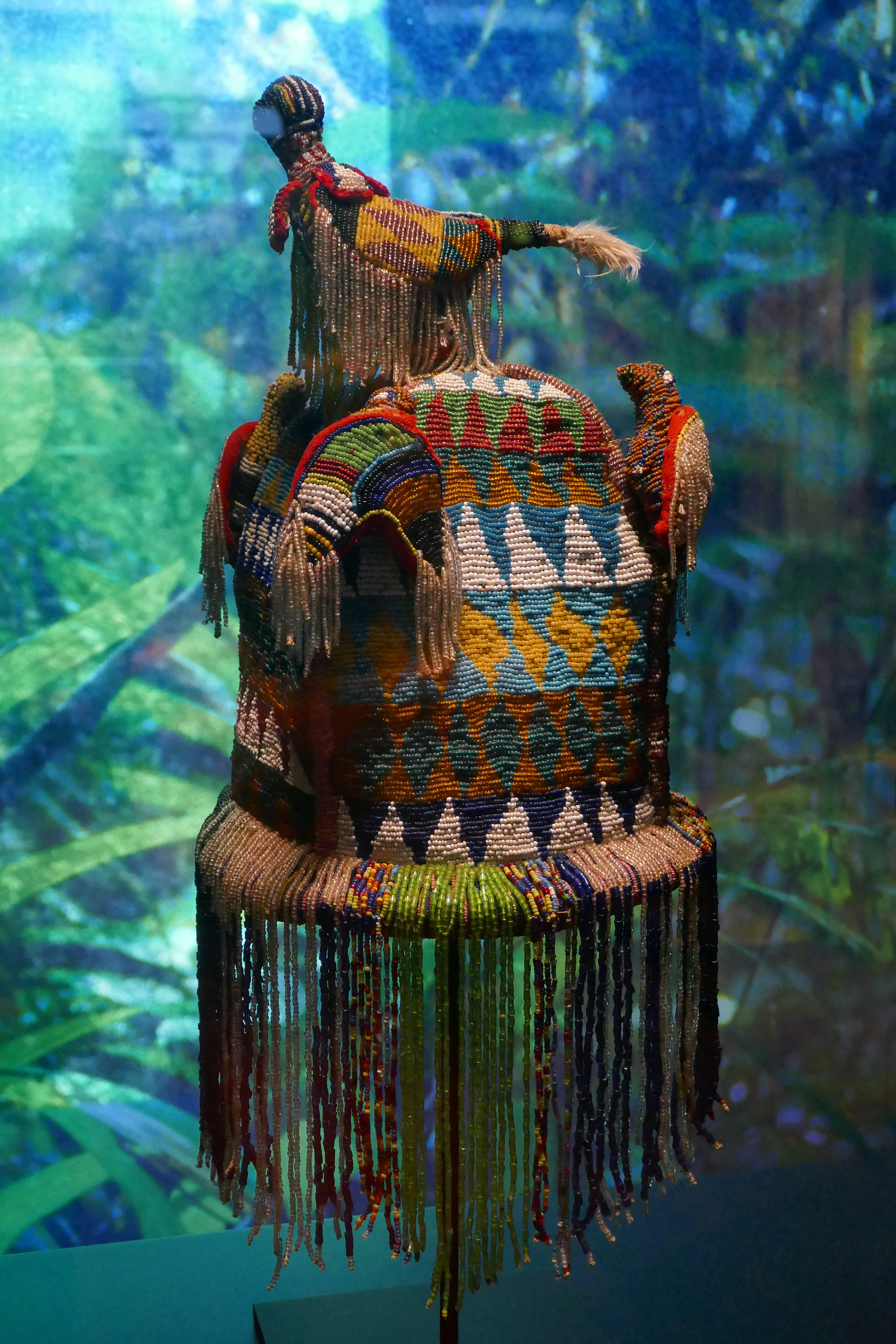
Yoruba type royal crown, Ade Nla from the kingdom of Danhomè, a kingdom that developed under heavy cultural influence from its much larger Yoruba neighbor. The beaded veil shields the Oba's own face and transforms him into a living embodiment of Odùduwà and the force of the collective ancestors. The birds signify that the Oba is a divine ruler. Half in the physical and half in the spiritual realms just as the birds can traverse both the terrestrial and the celestial. Musée du Quai Branly

Some crowns (called oríkògbófo) reflect the personal taste of a king. These include a mask referred to as the “dog-eared-one” (abetíajá), which is worn in such a way that the faces are oriented sideways, and smaller hats shaped like pillboxes, European crowns, and coronets. Babatunde Lawal writes: "Other crowns were influenced by European style lawyers' wigs, reflecting the radical changes that occurred in Yorubaland between the late nineteenth century and 1960, when the kings lost much of their political power to French and British colonial administrations. Although their position is largely ceremonial today, kings are still consulted by the state government before certain decisions are made. A wig-like crown presents a king as an effective advocate for his subjects."

Robert F. Thompson describes the impressive visual effect of the beaded veil in ritual context:

The vaguely perceived outlines of the face of the ruler match, in a sense, the generalized qualities of the frontal faces on the crown. Veiling diminishes the wearer's individuality so that he, too, becomes a generalized entity. Balance between the present and past emerges. No longer an individual, the king becomes the dynasty.

According to the Orangun-Ila, the ade is an orisa. When the ade is placed upon the king's head, his ori uni (inner head) becomes one with those who have reigned before him, who are also considered orisa.

== Bird Motif ==
The bird motif on most crowns has layers of meaning. It recalls how Odùduwà, assisted by a mythical bird, created habitable land on the primordial waters at Ilé Ifè, where he eventually became the first king. It is also emblematic of the role of the king as an intermediary between his subjects and the òrìsà, in the same way that a bird mediates between heaven and earth. Finally, it alludes to a mystical power (àse) that Olòdúmarè reportedly gave to the first female (in the form of a bird enclosed in a calabash), thus allowing her to counterbalance the muscular advantage of men. This mystical power is said to be responsible not only for her ability to procreate but also for her capacity to turn into a bird at night to do good or evil. Thus, by having a symbol of archetypal female power on his crown, a king is expected to manipulate that power for the good of all. This explains why the Ìyá Oba (Official Mother of the King) crowns a new monarch in some towns — to underscore the fact that he has the support of the women. Bird motifs are also present on other sacred or otherwise important objects such as Osanyin staffs.

== History ==
There are a variety of differing stories that speak to the history of the ade, or the Oba's crown. What most of these stories have in common is that they acknowledge the primacy of Ile-Ife as the first "crowned town" from which all Yoruba kings can trace their descent.

One of these ancient stories states that before he died, Oduduwa, the founder and first king of the Yoruba people, gave a beaded crown to each of his sixteen sons and sent them forth to establish their own kingdoms. Another story states that when Oduduwa was old and almost blind, his sons stole their father's ades and with the authority of the ade established their own kingdoms. This story parallels the breakup of the Oyo Empire into multiple, smaller kingdoms.

Since the mid-nineteenth century, the authority of the oba has been established through an identification with Oduduwa and Ile-Ife.

== Beads and their significance ==
Religious text and legend dictate that Yoruba gods chose beaded strands as their emblems. Yoruba crowns, embellished with beaded embroidery, connote power by divine sanction. In fact, only a select few in Yoruba society are permitted to wear or use beaded objects, including kings, chiefs, princes, priests, diviners and native doctors.

In the 1960's, crowns were embellished with imported colored beads from England. Formerly, red jasper beads were imported from Litingo in Upper Volta and fashioned and polished at Oyo-Ile (Old Oyo), forming the main material used in royal bead embroidery In antiquity, beads of different colours were made in Ile-Ife.

Bead embroidery is practiced by extremely skilled men in a number of Nigerian centers, especially at Efon-Alaye, Ile-Ife, Oyo, Ilesha, Abeokuta, and Iperu-Remo.

Beads and the process of using them in art and ritual are endowed with multiple layers of meaning and significance. Beads and covering oneself in them is healing: Colorful beads are considered to be charms (oogun) that act upon malevolent forces. To wear neck beads (kele) in contrasting shades of red (pupa) and white (funfun) signifies both the punitive and the healing presence of Shango, the Yoruba god of thunder.

The art of beading, or stringing, follows the serial process and seriate composition of Yoruba art, an extension of the fundamental principle of ase. One bead in a step-by-step (leseese) or one-by-one (leto-lto) manner. Just as the wrapped bundle of wooden sticks (atoori) on an ancestral altar symbolizes the continuity of a family legacy, beads symbolize consistent continuity from generation to generation. When threaded together, beads represent solidarity and unity.

As they encircle and adorn parts of the body, beads conceal and protect a person's ase and, through their symbolic meaning, may also reveal essential characteristics of that person.
