= Benin altars to the hand =

Type of cylindrical sculpture of the Benin Empire

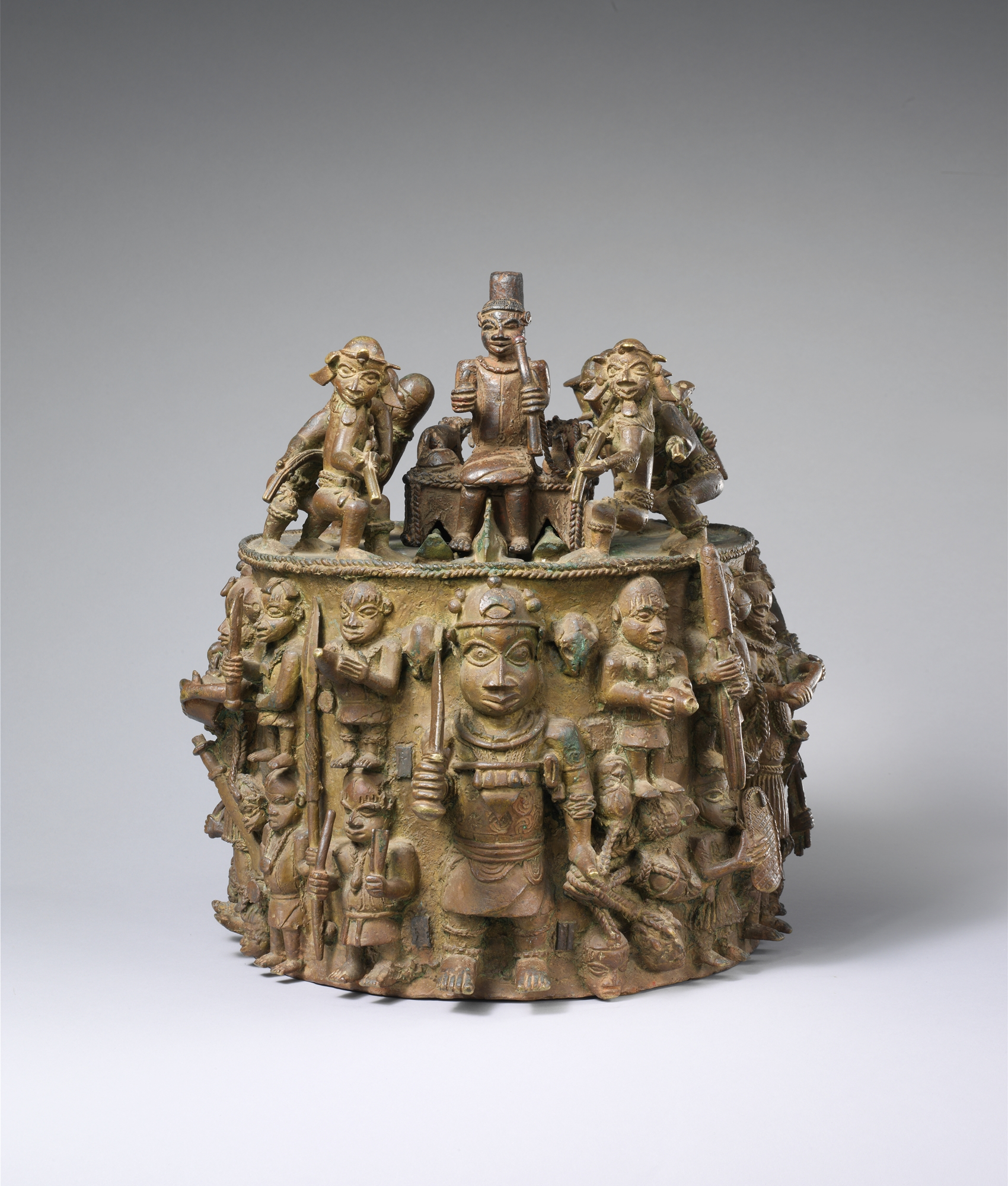
Ikegobo (Altar to the Hand) of Ezomo Ehenua, 18th - 19th century

Ikegobo, the Edo term for "altars to the Hand," are a type of cylindrical sculpture from the Benin Empire. Used as a cultural marker of an individual's accomplishments, Ikegobo are dedicated to the hand, from which the people of Benin considered the will for wealth and success to originate. These commemorative objects are made of wood or brass with figures carved in relief around their sides.

Ikegobo, like the royal ancestral altars, are settings for spectacular examples of Benin art.

== The cult of the Hand in Nigeria ==
The cult of the Hand is based on the belief that a man's right hand or arm embodies his capacity for accomplishment. The cult focuses on a man's skill with tools, his economic effectiveness, and his ability to win physical contests. The Hand will also protect him and his household from attacks by malevolent spirits or human enemies.

In Benin culture, the hand is worshiped primarily by those who have already achieved outstanding success or wealth.

The Benin kings and chiefs have worshiped the hand since the time of Oba Ewuare, the fifteenth-century warrior king. The wars of expansion that Ewuare waged and won not only gave him the impetus to become a devotee of the hand, but may have also exposed him to other areas of southern Nigeria where hand worship was practiced.

== Design and materials ==
Wooden altars to the hand are owned by Benin chiefs. The Oba, queen mother, and certain other privileged chiefs have the right to own cast brass ikegobo.

The cylindrical form refers to a type of round, legless stool commonly used by the Edo in the past. The altar is placed on an altar stand, a semicircular platform whose straight edge is extended at both sides, which is carved on its top and sides with figures and other motifs in relief. A wooden spoke at the top of the altar supports an ivory tusk.

Altars were placed in the second public room of the house of traditional chiefs, on top of a polished and whitened mud platform.
