= Benin ancestral altars =

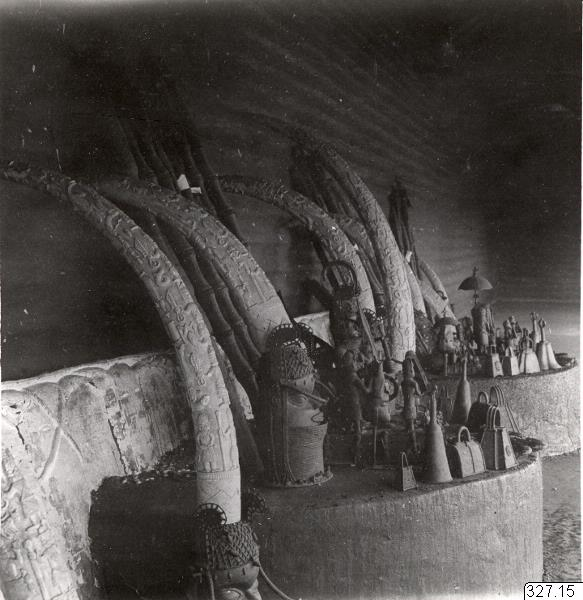
Oba Akenzua II's ancestral altars, 1936

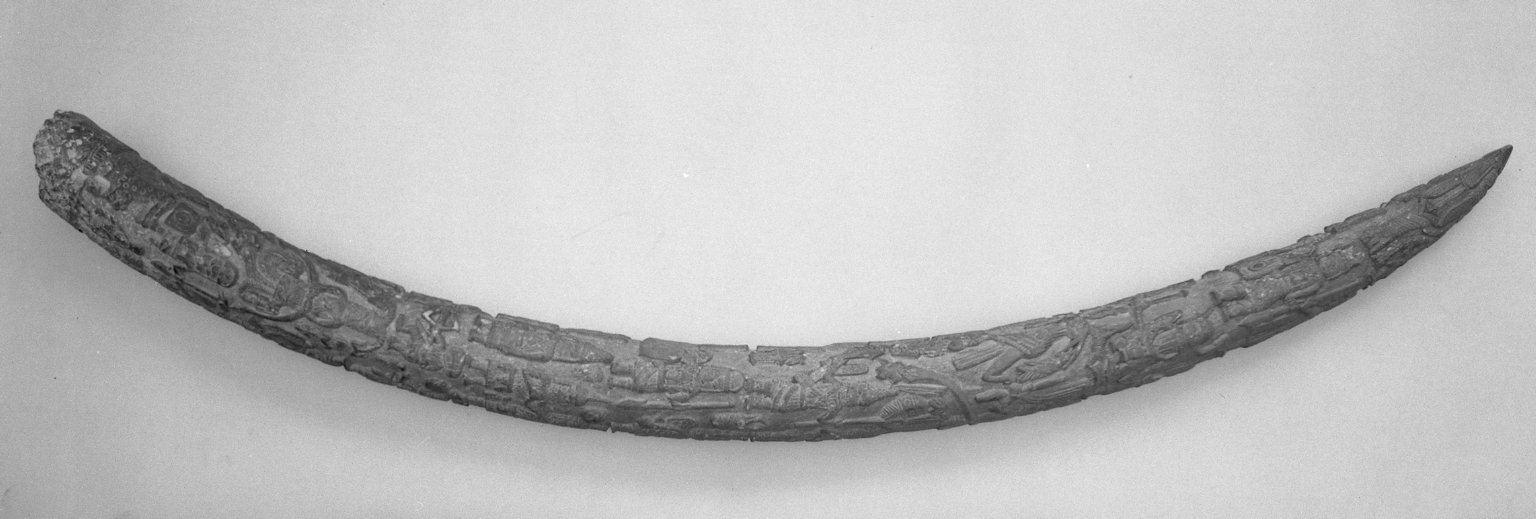
Since the 18th century, or possibly earlier, oba's altars have been embellished with matched pairs of carved elephant tusks, reflecting the increase in ivory's value at that time. The tusks were anchored on brass commemorative heads. Ivory's white color evokes spiritual harmony for the Edo; thus, its presence enhances an altar's sanctity. Ivory's important role as a commodity controlled by the oba also made it attractive for use on royal altars.

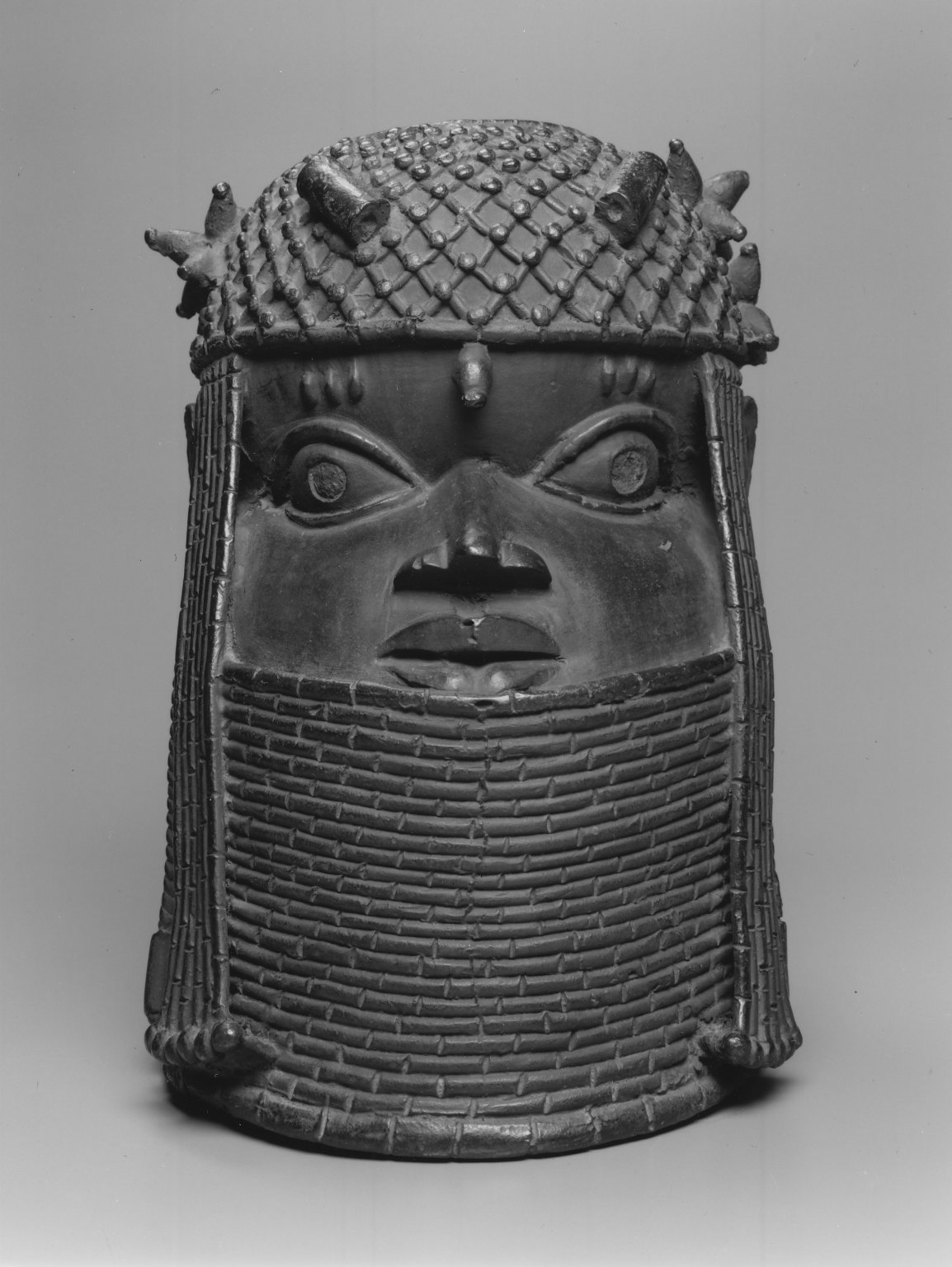
This cast-brass head, from the collection of the Brooklyn Museum, would have been commissioned for a royal altar in Benin. Its relative naturalism and shiny surface make it both beautiful and frightening, appropriate attributes for a powerful monarch. The coral-beaded crown and collar represent the regalia worn by reigning obas.

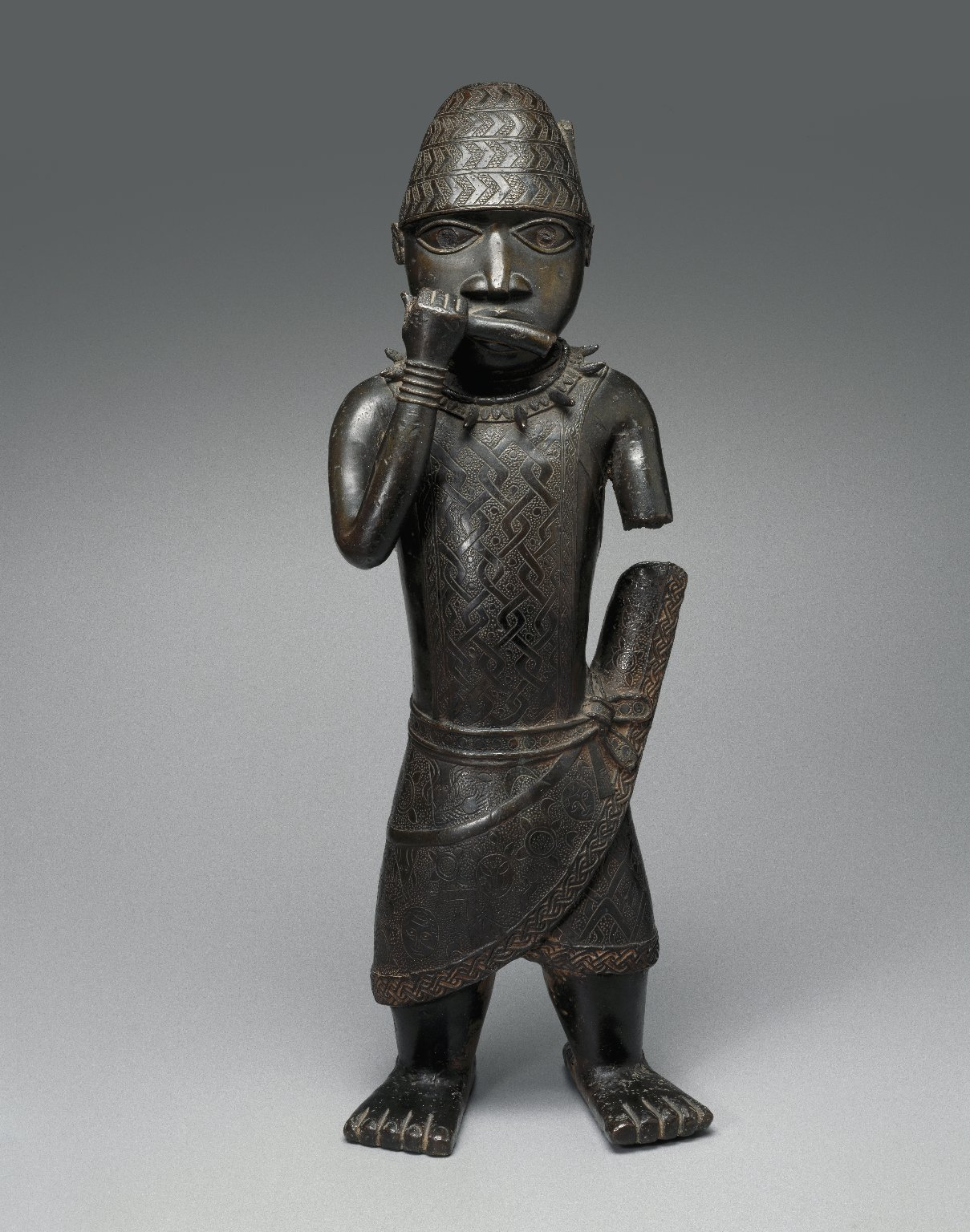
This figure of a hornblower, from the collection of the Brooklyn Museum, probably stood on an altar dedicated to a deceased king, or oba. His conical hat and elaborately wrapped skirt with a projection on the left side all indicate that he is a court official. The necklace of leopard's teeth was worn only by warriors. The horn this figure once held is believed to have been a type called an erere, blown during ceremonial sacrifices. A motif on the figure's kilt depicting an elephant, whose trunk ends in a human right hand, identifies this work with the reign of the oba Esigie, thought to have ruled from 1504 to 1550.

In Edo culture, the creation of Benin ancestral altars plays a vital role in honoring deceased relatives, preserving family legacies, and facilitating communication with the spirit world. This practice was and remains widespread throughout Edo society, with commoners, chiefs and the Oba of Benin, or divine king, all establishing some form of family shrine. The origins of ancestral altars in Edo culture are believed to trace back to the early era of Kingdom of Benin, though the exact timeline is unclear. Royal ancestral altars, in particular, held great significance, as they were deeply intertwined with the Oba's succession to the throne and the consolidation of his power. These altars were often decorated with sacred objects, such as altar tableaus, commemorative heads, carved tusks, and musical instruments, which not only enshrined the legacies of rulers but also facilitated communication between the world of the living and the spirit realm. The ceremonial objects placed on these altars are considered some of the finest examples of Benin art and are revered for their cultural and spiritual importance.

== Role of Benin ancestral altars ==
The creation of ancestral altars serves to honour and affirm family lineage, celebrate the life and achievements of the deceased relatives, and preserve their memory through the display of symbolic objects placed on shrines. These objects placed on the altars strategically recount how the deceased fulfilled their social destiny and cemented the memory of their social identity. Typically the responsibility of establishing, decorating, and dedicating these ancestral shrines falls onto the eldest son, especially if the deceased is his father.The success of the altar in conveying that the ancestor fulfilled their social purpose plays a crucial role in determining the fate of their soul. If the altar does not effectively communicate this, it is believed that the soul will be condemned to wander between the spirit world and the realm of the living. However, if the altar successfully reflects the legacy of the deceased, the soul is believed to be able to enter the spirit world and, eventually be reincarnated. In addition to preserving the memory of the ancestors, these altars also act as a conduit for the deceased ancestors to communicate with and continue to guide the living family members from the spirit realm.

== History of ancestral altars ==
The precise origins of establishing traditional ancestral altars remains unclear, due to the oral nature of the Edo culture. However, a 2008 publication by the Art Institute of Chicago theorized that the practice of creating ancestral altars most likely originated during the earliest periods of the Benin Kingdom. It was not until the arrival of the Portuguese, sometime between 1472 and 1485, to the Kingdom of Benin that written records of Edo history emerge.

The Portuguese were on a mission to acquire natural resources and treasures as well as spread Christianity throughout new continents, when they encountered the Kingdom of Benin. They encountered an organized society that was ruled over by an absolute monarch, the Oba, who was supported by an aristocratic court and bureaucratic system of rule. With the Oba's succession and success dependent on the practice of ancestor worship, the Portuguese gained little traction in their efforts to Christianize the peoples of Benin. However, they did establish a prosperous trade relationship with the Oba who possessed sole control of opening the trading markets. This relationship with the Portuguese resulted in a surplus of lead brass in the form of manillas (or bracelets) that in turn resulted in the expansion of the practice of brass casting in Benin art. The Oba's trade monopoly over the market made Benin a difficult trading partner for the Portuguese, especially because the Portuguese were required to participate in time consuming court ceremonies. The Benin market became unprofitable for the Portuguese and they abandoned their trading posts due to this difficulty, along with the crippling impact of disease and the competition of the spice trade, specifically pepper.

After the Portuguese presence diminished, the Kingdom of Benin remained independent from European presence for many years. At the end of the nineteenth century, European powers began pressuring the Kingdom of Benin to open up more of the region for European commerce specifically the forests. In 1897, the Kingdom of Benin was conquered by the British and incorporated into a British colony that eventually became the modern nation of Nigeria. This episode is referred to as the Punitive Expedition of 1897. Oba Ovonramwen, who was crowned in 1888 as the thirty-fifth ruler in his lineage, was sent into lifelong exile. The British confiscated all of the objects from Benin City that they associated with divine kingship, and took the objects to London to be sold. The British believed that by removing all the sacred objects from the Kingdom it would break the ancestral power of the ruler in the eyes for the Edo people and the practice of human sacrifice would stop. Unfortunately, no records were kept of their original location, context, or ownership. In this way, thousands of complex artworks were removed from Benin and dispersed in museums and private collections.

Before the conquest and plundering of the Punitive Expedition in 1897, there were eighteen altars dedicated to previous Obas. After the British exiled Oba Ovonramwen (r. c. 1888 – c. 1897), residents from Benin City escaped into the villages including many of the artisans and craftsman who had worked for the Oba. For many years without the Oba's patronage, art and sacred objects were not produced in the Kingdom of Benin. In 1914, when the British allowed the monarchy to be reinstated, a new Oba appointed. He began to rebuild palaces, revive Benin artwork and resume the practice of ancestral worship. The new Oba reactivated four ancestral shrines that were dedicated to his last four predecessors and a communal shrine was created for all the other previous Obas. In 1976, robbers stole the contents of these revived ancestral shrines and the ruler at that time, Oba Erwdiauwa (r. 1979 –2016), moved the ancestral altars inside the palace walls and replaced all the stolen contents.

== Commoners' ancestral altars ==
The commoners' altar is a mud rectangle surmounted by a long row of rattle staffs, which reflect the activities of generations of senior sons. The staff finials depict a generalized ancestral head, devoid of any marks of status. One or more brass bells are placed in the center of the altar to be rung at the beginning of rituals. Occasionally, the senior son will add decorative elements that relate directly to his father's life.

== Chiefly ancestral altars ==
Chiefly ancestral altars have a similar form to commoner's ancestral altars but are more highly decorated. Specific to chiefly ancestral altars is the wooden commemorative head, or uhunmwun elao, which represents the chief by accurately depicting the regalia of his rank.

== Royal ancestral altars ==
In order to ensure dynastic continuity, a newly installed oba is responsible for creating an altar dedicated to his father and predecessor. Different from the commoner or chiefly altars, royal altars are made out of white clay and are in a round shape instead of rectangular. These sacred surfaces display symbolic objects that are reserved for royal use only. These altar holds objects commissioned to honour the leader being commemorated, and thus are adorned and activated on a regular basis with libations of food or animal blood. Food and animal sacrifices to these commemorative objects on the altar function to increase the Oba's power with spiritual aid from his predecessors.

In addition to his father, the Oba also commissions an ancestral altar for his late mother, known as the Iyoba or Queen mother. This honour is given because, by giving birth to the new Oba, she holds special distinction among the other queens. It is commonly believed that by being the one to succeed and give birth to the Oba the queen mother possessed supernatural powers. By dedicating altars to the Iyoba and honoring her through sacrifices, the Oba could harness his mother's supernatural powers and receive support and guidance from her during his reign. Unlike the public commemorative court ceremonies celebrated to honor the Oba's predecessor, the sacrificial rites given to the Iyoba are private and therefore not a state affair.

=== Altar tableaus ===
Unique to royal ancestral shrines, altar tableaus function to illustrate and commemorate the position and prestige that the ruler once held. Centred on top of the round clay altars, these rectangular cast brass tableaus depicted a royal figure surrounded by attendants and court officials. The ruler for whom the tableau is dedicated is typically the center of the altarpiece and is differentiated from courtiers by royal ceremonial attire and symbols.

=== Commemorative heads ===
Oral tradition suggests that the creation of royal commemorative heads may have begun as early

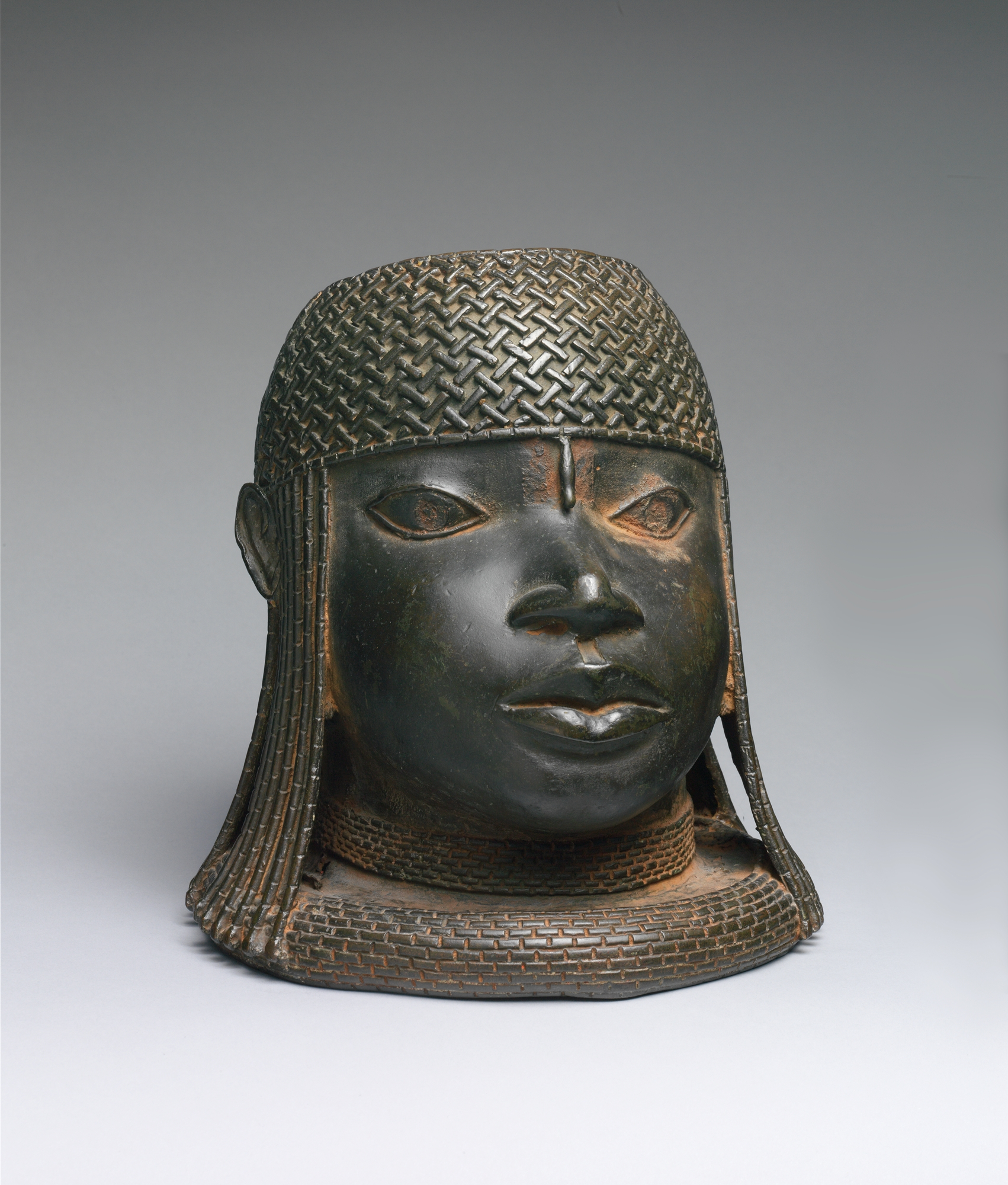
Head of an Oba displayed in the Metropolitan Museum of Art

as the fourteenth century or possibly even earlier. These heads were placed on ancestral altars to both mark the reign of the new Oba and honor the legacy of the previous ruler. Creating these commemorative heads became a privilege and a responsibility of the Oba, symbolizing the continuity of the monarchy and the rulers connection to his ancestors. In Edo culture, the Oba's head is especially symbolic, representing the pivotal role the monarch played in guiding the kingdom and ensuring success during his reign. The commemorative heads were not meant to be portraits of the past Obas; instead, they served as generalized representations, crafted from materials like brass, terracotta and wood. Less is known about terracotta and wood heads, although some surviving examples still remain.

These brass commemorative heads typically feature high coral collars, known as odigba in Benin culture, often resemble brickwork patterns around their neck. Coral beads were used in royal regalia because they were believed to possess protective and healing powers, marking the wearers royal status.

Though the exact timing of the earliest brass casting practices is unclear, it seems that the arrival of the Portuguese coincided with the increased production of brass royal commemorative heads. Brass was valued for its durability, and along with ivory, it was considered an ideal material for preserving the legacy of the monarchy. Traditionally, these brass heads were regularly polished to maintain their shiny red color, which held symbolical significance. The red hue was believed to repel evil forces, adding an extra layer of protection to the royal lineage. Additionally, sumptuary laws were enacted to restrict the use of brass, ensuring that it was reserved for royal commemoration, emphasizing the power and status of the Oba and his family.

Atop of the commemorative heads, a crown also made of coral beads is often seen, accompanied by a latticework cap that has strings of what appears to be coral or decorative beads hanging down. Commemorative heads of the Iyoba share similar features, such as the coral crown and hanging beads, but they are distinguished by a unique coiffure known as the "chicken's beak," (ukpe-okhue) a hairstyle that signifies their rank. Additionally, brass heads often have a hole in the crown into which carved ivory tusks were placed.

=== Carved tusks ===
The practice of carving ivory is believed to have originated in Benin tradition around the 13th century. However, the tradition of placing intricately carved tusks on top of the brass commemorative heads appears to have emerged only around mid-eighteenth century. The size and quantity of these tusks placed on the altar varied but often times most royal ancestral altars consisted of five to twelve carved tusks. These tusk played an important role not only in depicting the Oba's life, but also was a significant spiritual symbol. Each tusk placed on the royal altars conveys a unique story that highlights the political, economic, and spiritual conditions of the deceased Oba's reign.

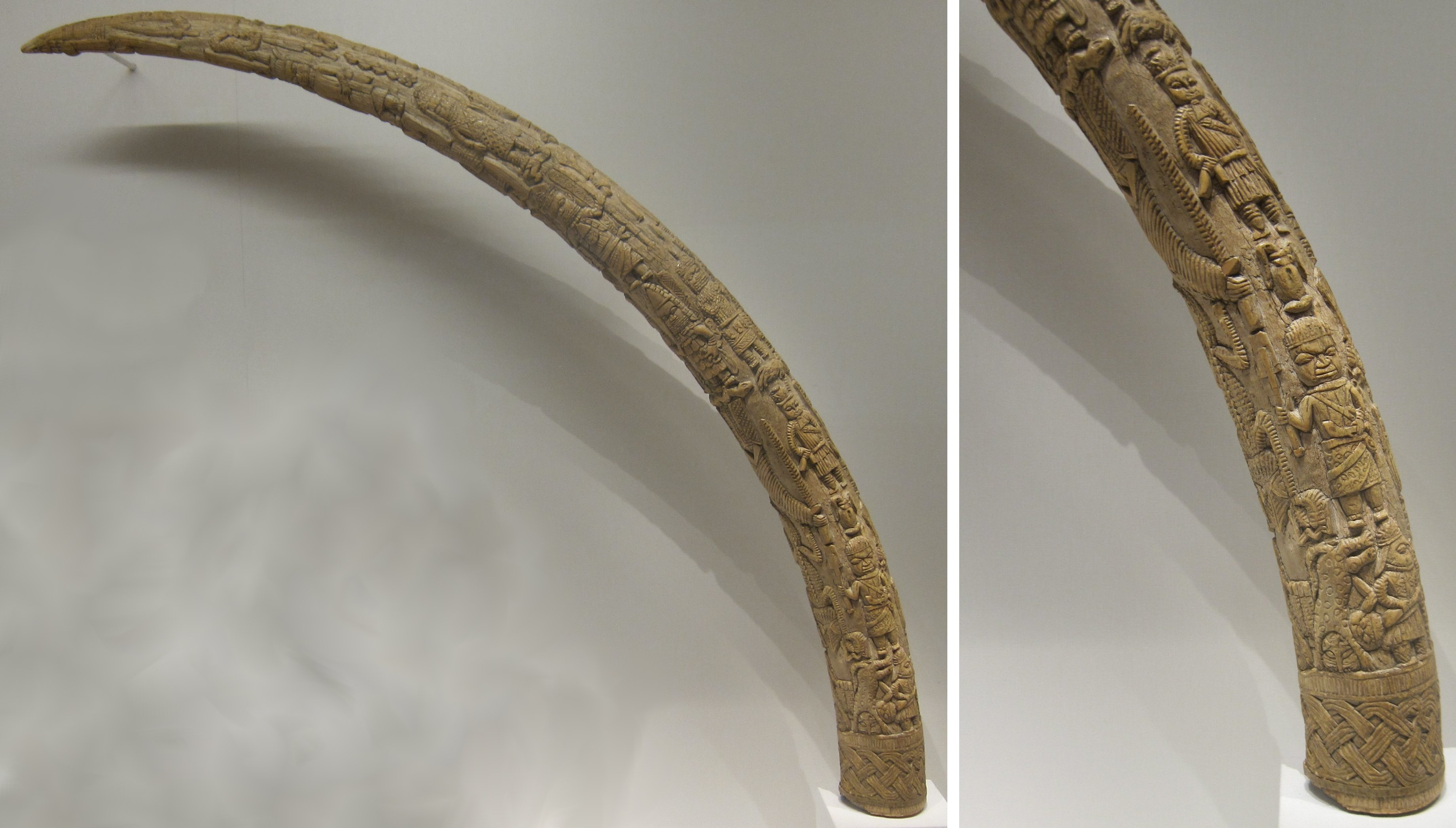
Nigeria, Benin Kingdom, Ẹdo peoples, members of the Igbesanmwan (wood and ivory carvers) guild on display in The Cleveland Museum of Art

Aligned with the coral beaded crown on the top of the brass head, these tusks protruded upward and serve to connect the world of the living to the spirit realm of the ancestors. These tusks functioned as a visual bridge between the two worlds and they were so important that only high ranking male dignitaries could touch them. The utilization of ivory on these altars was a deliberate choice. Since the Oba had a monopoly over the ivory trade, ivory symbolically illustrated his political power and wealth. Since ivory came from elephants, the tusks were thereby associated with the attributes of an elephant, such as wisdom, leadership, and physical power. The whiteness of the tusks was also significant because the color looked like the kaolin clay, which used in rituals and represented joy, prosperity, purity, and peace. It was important to maintain the purity of this whiteness after each ritual sacrifice, so blood and food was continually cleaned off of them.

=== Instruments ===
==== Rattle staffs ====
Rattle staffs (ukhurue) played an important role in commemorating and communicating with the deceased royal ancestors in ritual ceremonies. Often seen lined at the back of the ancestral altars, they were believed to contain the collective authority of the ancestors. Typically made out of wood, modified branches or twigs, rattle staffs were segmented wood staffs that had a hollow chamber with a trapped wood block that would rattle when shaken. Sometimes these staffs were made out of ivory and brass, but was only a right that the royal family was allowed. Carved and decorated, the rattle staffs were usually decorated with heads or figures carved at the top and covered with royal iconographic motifs that alluded to the Oba's power, such as the mudfish, leopards and crocodiles. Not only were these rattle staffs decorative symbols of remembrance, but they also held an important role in communicating and summoning the ancestors during ceremonial rituals. In ceremonial use these staffs would have been take down and rattled and hit on the ground to communicate with the ancestors in the spirit realm.

==== Brass bells ====
Although less is known about them, brass bells (eroro), were typically placed on the front of Benin royal ancestral altars. During ceremonial rituals, these bells are picked up and rung to signal the commencement of the ceremony or to call the spirits to accept and partake in the sacrifice.
