= Art of the Kingdom of Benin =

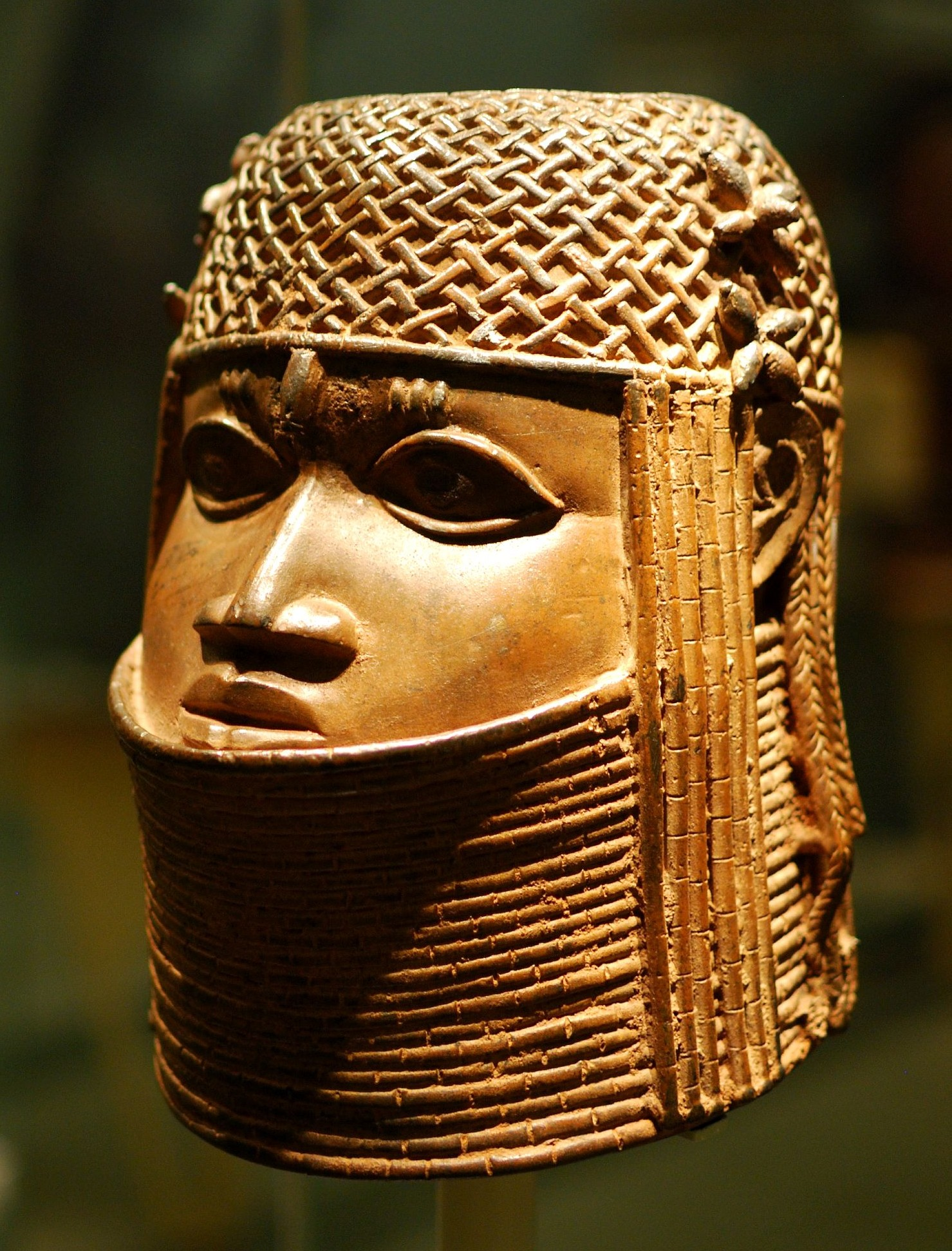
Benin bronze, 16th century

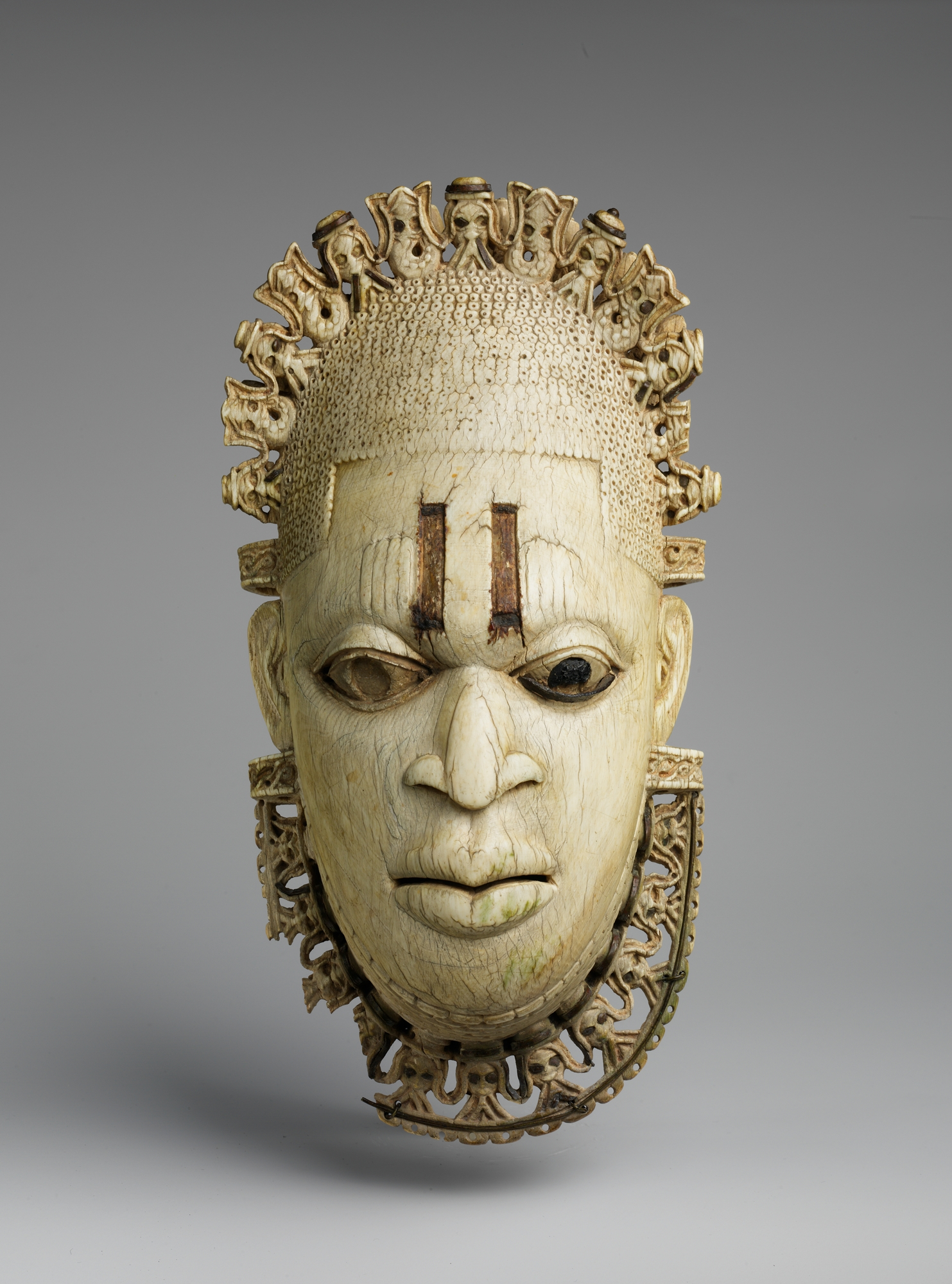
Benin ivory mask

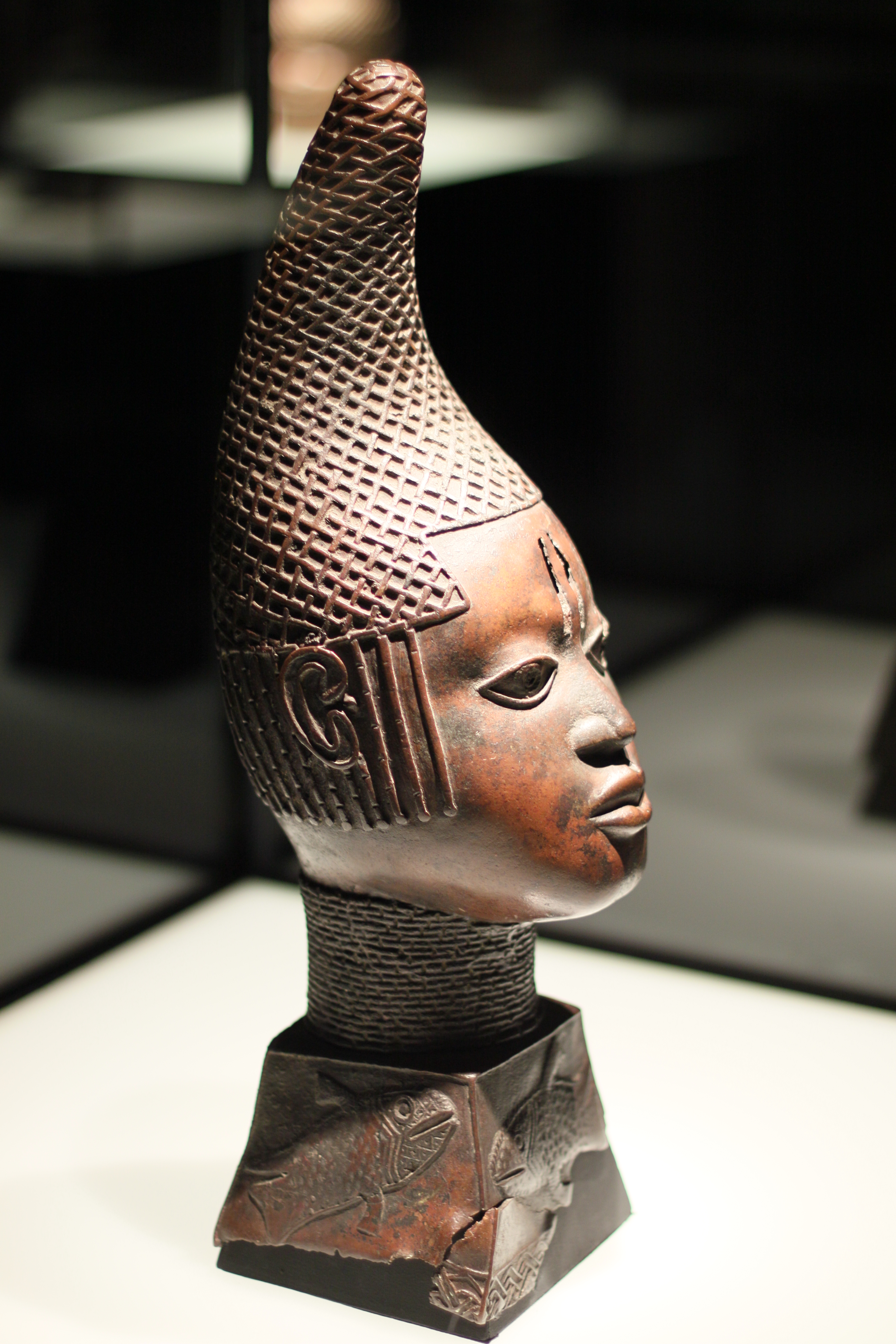
Bronze Head of Queen Idia

Benin art is the art from the Kingdom of Benin or Edo Empire (1440–1897), a pre-colonial African state located in what is now known as the Southern region of Nigeria. Primarily made of cast bronze and carved ivory, Benin art was produced mainly for the court of the Oba of Benin – a divine ruler for whom the craftsmen produced a range of ceremonially significant objects. The full complexity of these works can be appreciated through the awareness and consideration of two complementary cultural perceptions of the art of Benin: the Western appreciation of them primarily as works of art, and their understanding in Benin as historical documents and as mnemonic devices to reconstruct history, or as ritual objects. This original significance is of great importance in Benin. In terms of specific imagery, leopards are identifying figures to represent the Oba of Benin as a competent and dominant force in their territory.

== Importance of art in Benin culture ==
The Kingdom of Benin is powerful, but Benin culture has not been given proper recognition by Western scholars. The story of how the Kingdom of Benin began as a culture and nation starts with its origin story:

A motionless man was floating on water when he heard a voice from a spirit saying, "Open your eyes". As soon as the man opened his eyes he became one with the spirit. Soon after a whip and snail shell appear beside him, and the man then decided to whip the terrain he was on. A golden orb appeared, and this golden orb, which would later be known as the sun, brings happiness and warmth to the man. Again, the man struck his whip to the earth, and this caused forests and wildlife to appear before him. Yet again, the man struck the earth with his whip, and a village full of people appeared. He then became known as the Lord from the Sky. As a result, he ordered the village to build a mound of earth painted white that would serve as a remembrance of his power and creation. He then recognized a man as the priest, and he ordered that the priest must always wear white.

The story of the origin of Benin was not transferred through literature or writings. In fact, Benin as a culture was based on oral tradition: all of the history and stories known today from Benin were passed along from person to person and from generation to generation. The so-called Benin Bronzes (they are actually made of brass) and other artworks are especially important to historians because they are a key part of the history of Benin. Also, the Benin brasses and works of art are some of the only examples historians have of the physical representations of the culture. At first, the city and culture of Benin started off as a kingdom that was based solely on chiefly tribute. Later on, Benin's culture and history were enriched and became more powerful because of the conquests they made through war. For example, a war that was detrimental to Benin was the Idah war (1515–1516). The Idah war was a religious war in which Benin won. This war helped to establish unity and power in the Benin Empire. The wars Benin participated in and the people Benin conquered made Benin into an imperial power. It was under Oba Ewuare (r. 1440–1473) that Benin became an empire by launching its military and conquering other lands. This also led to the formation of many trade routes and tribute-paying towns. Therefore, the first Europeans to arrive in Benin were very impressed with the wealth and advancements of the country. Overall, the Benin culture is an extremely important part of history because it is a culture not based on literature, and it is a culture that had great power before the 16th century.

== Chronology ==
Given the stylistic differences, the art of Benin has been divided by some authors, including Egyptologist Boris de Rachewiltz in the following periods:

No.	Name	Duration
1	the Archaic Period	from the origins-1360
2	the Ancient Period	1360–1500
3	the Flowering Period	1500–1575
4	the Apogee Period	1575–1648
5	the "Renaissance"	1648–1691
6	the Decline Period	1691–1819

== Royal arts of Benin ==
The royal arts of the Benin Kingdom of southern region Nigeria affirm the centrality of the Oba, or divine king, portraying his divine nature. While recording the kingdom's significant historical events and the Oba's involvement with them, they also initiate the Oba's interactions with the supernatural and honor his deified ancestors, forging a continuity that is vital to the kingdom's well-being.

The materials used in Benin's royal arts—primarily brass, ivory, and coral—are endowed with sacred power. The innate value of these materials within Benin and the time and skill that is invested in working them reflect the earthly and otherworldly influence of the Oba and the great wealth of his kingdom. Benin's royal arts belong to a tradition that favors convention even as it promotes creativity and innovation, especially as a reflection of royal prerogative. Through time, rulers have used the arts to interpret the history of the kingdom and to orient themselves with the past in an effort to support their own initiatives and define their images for posterity.

Although only popularly known to Western audiences after the Benin Expedition of 1897, Benin art has been in existence since at least the 13th century.

== Ancestral altars ==
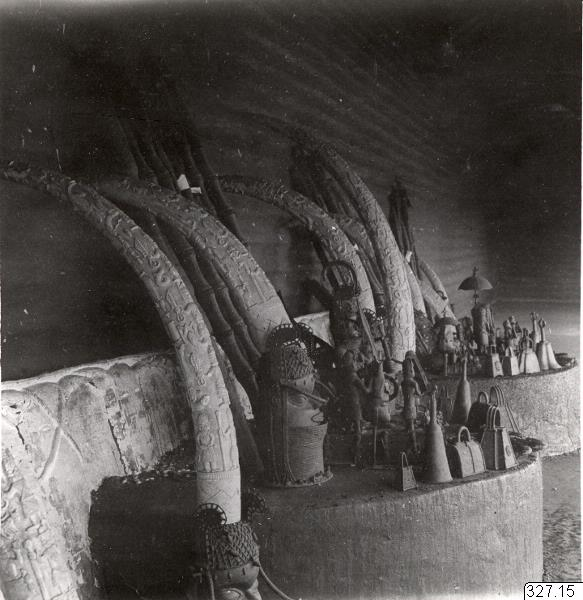
Two ancestral altars, foreground, that of Oba Akenzua II's, 1936

A newly installed Oba is responsible for creating an altar dedicated to his father, commissioning the appropriate objects to adorn it and activating it on a regular basis with sacrifices of food or animal blood. The Oba does the same for his mother if she attained the title of Iyoba, or queen mother. While bells and rattle staffs are placed on all ancestral altars, ivory tusks and commemorative brass heads are made specifically for royal altars. Associated with trade, ivory and brass are durable and valuable, and their colors—white like sacred kaolin clay and red like fire and coral beads—relate to royal power.

Before the British conquest, an Oba's courtyard was the focal point for rituals in his honor. British troops reported 18 altars dedicated to previous Obas when they took possession of the palace in 1897. Today, all of the royal altars stand together in a single courtyard.

One of the objects unique to Benin art is an Ikegobo or "altar to the hand," which celebrates the accomplishments of exceptional individuals. The hand is associated with action and productivity, and is considered the source of wealth, status, and success for all those who depend on manual skill and physical strength. Altars of this kind are commissioned in terracotta, wood, or brass, depending on the status of the patron.

== Art related to rituals at court ==
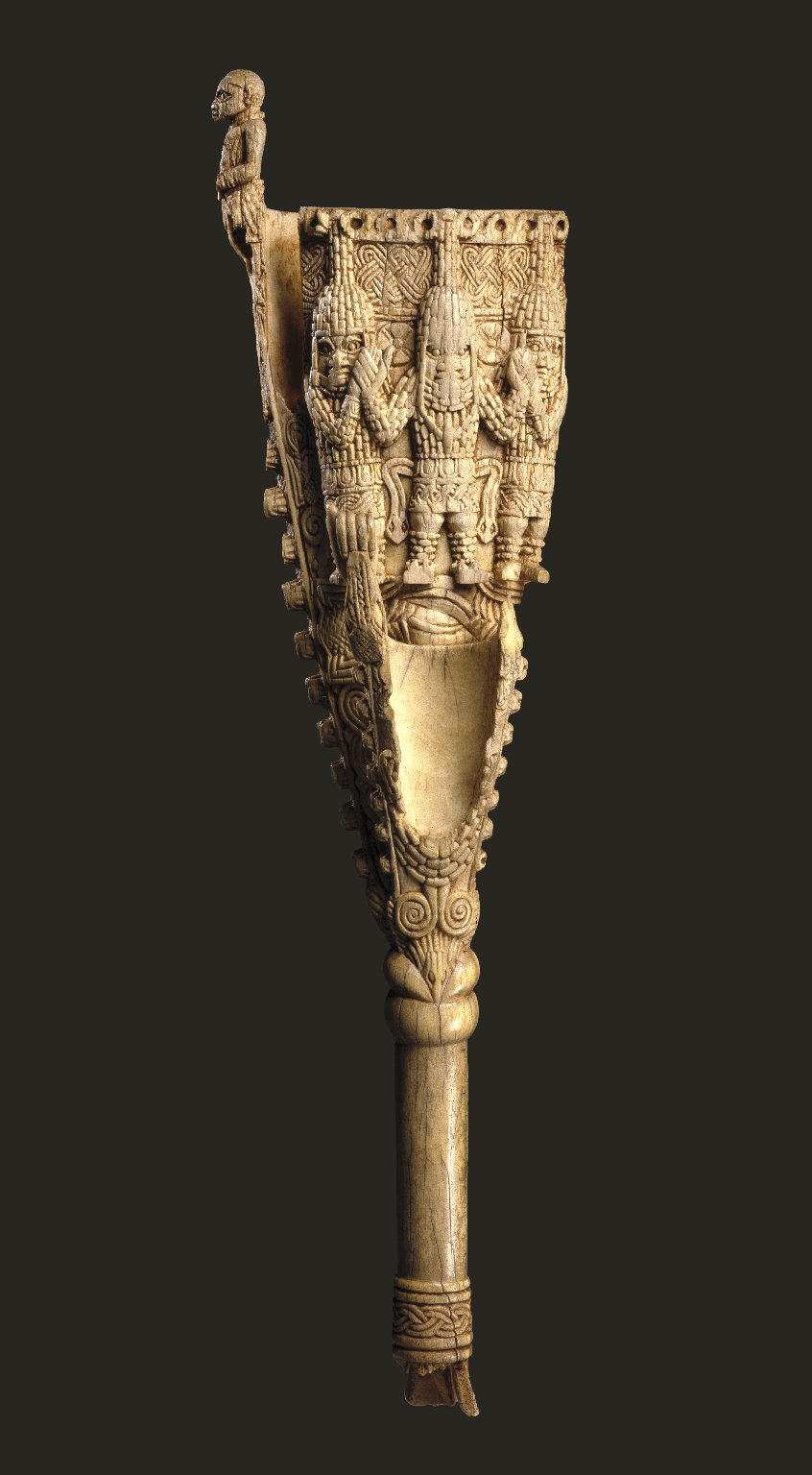
This ivory double bell (Egogo) is one of the oldest surviving African ivory sculptures; only six of these ivory gongs are known. They were used by the oba during the Emobo ceremony to drive away evil spirits. Carved with the oba, supported by his military commander and his heir.

Private and public ceremonies mark many of the important moments in Benin's yearly calendar. In the past, an elaborate series of rites were performed throughout the year to secure otherworldly support for the kingdom's well-being and to celebrate decisive events in its history. For the sake of convenience, the current monarch, Oba Ewuare II, emphasizes the end-of-year festival called Igue, which is held during the winter holidays to allow the greatest number of people to attend. Igue includes a sequence of rituals that renew the Oba's supernatural powers and cleanse the kingdom's unruly spirits.

Benin's other important ritual festivals include Ague (Osa and Oghene), where the first budded yams are blessed in hopes of a successful harvest; Ugie Ivie, the Festival of Beads, in which the Oba's coral and red stone regalia is bathed in cow's blood to reinvest it with spiritual force; Ugie Erha Oba, which honors the Oba's father and all paternal ancestors; Ugie Oduduwa, a masquerading event that likewise honors the Oba's paternal ancestors; and Ugie Oro, celebrating Oba Esigie's victory over the Idah Kingdom in the 16th century.

Finely carved ivory double gongs are examples of art related to rituals at court. They are called “double” gongs because of second, smaller resonating cups at their front. Typically, the central image is the Oba in coral regalia supported by the high priests Osa and Osuan, officials who tend the altars of the kingdom's two patron gods. These gongs are still carried today by the Oba during Emobo, the last of the empowering rites of the Igue festival. The Oba gently taps the ivory instrument, creating a rhythmic sound to calm and dismiss unruly spirits from the kingdom.

== Leopard imagery in the arts of Benin ==
Within the Kingdom of Benin, leopards were tamed and kept in chains for the pleasure of the Oba. Leopards became a counterpart of the Oba due to their influential characteristics of being terrifying and ferocious leaders of the animal kingdom. Along with its traits, the Oba adopted sayings such as how a leopard's spots can not wash away in the rain, relating to how human nature is essentially steadfast. Equipped with leopard accessories, the Oba boasted the strength of his authority. For instance, a surviving Benin plaque from the Museum of Fine Arts in Boston, shows the Oba holding the tail of a leopard in each hand to demonstrate his vigor and dominion to symbolize his standing as King.

Leopard imagery is also frequently linked to the Oba's military might. Leopard accessories were an indication of status in the Kingdom of Benin as only the king and prestigious generals and high-ranking officials were permitted to wear or display them. On the occasion that war chiefs were awarded leopard decorations, the Oba bestowed upon badges of honor in the form of leopard hip ornaments to serve both as protection for the wearer and a boost of morality over the fear of death. From other recovered bronze plaques, among the wears of the Oba and his people, soldiers were equipped with leopard-tooth necklaces, warrior bells, hip ornaments, and much more to both protect their bodies and as a display of warriors of the Oba.

An example of a 19th-century Benin ivory leopard carving is found in the British Museum. The object was shaped into a carved, stylized, ivory leopard with spots of inlaid copper. Each of the leopard's main body parts were forged from a different tusk. Often showed in pairs, a pair of carved leopards resided not only as a decoration but as an expression of superiority within the Oba's palace in Benin City.

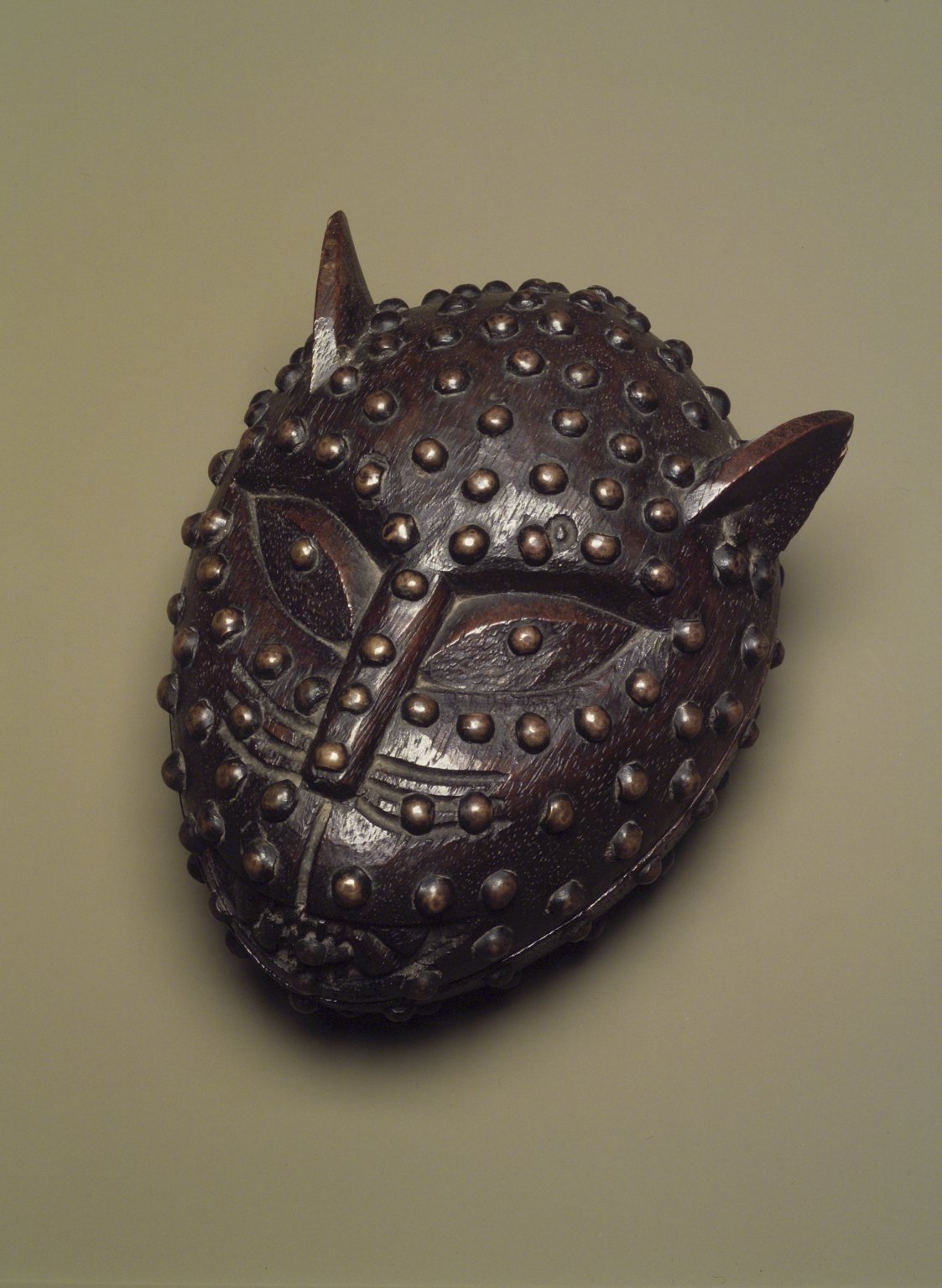
Box in the form of a leopard's head; 19th century; 17.1 x 14 cm (6 3/4 x 5 1/2 in.); Brooklyn Museum (New York City). This box was used to hold kola nuts presented to visitors in the royal court of Benin. Leopards are one of the most commonly portrayed animals in African art. Intelligent and courageous, they often serve as metaphors for powerful individuals or associations

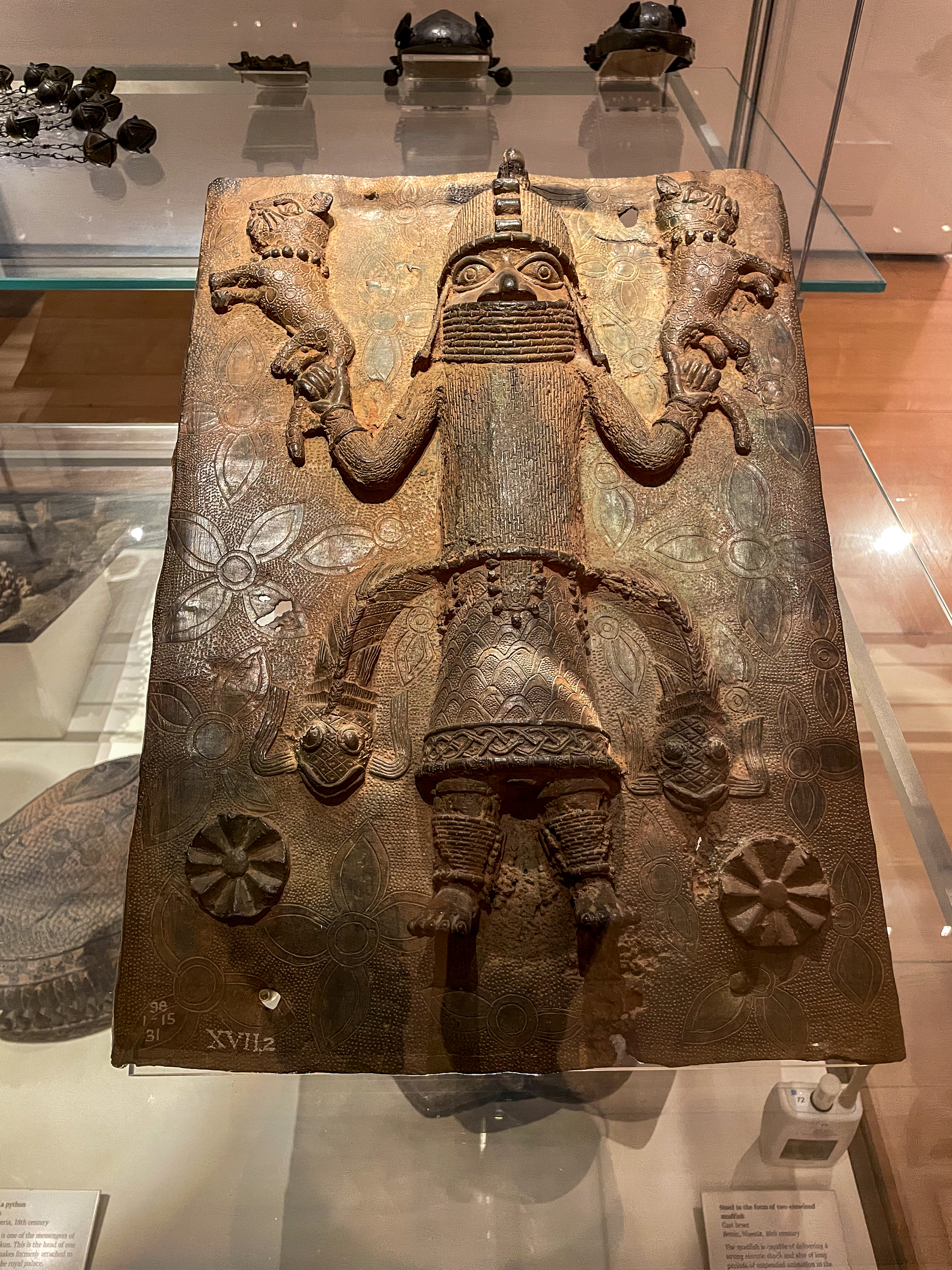
Relief plaque showing a king (Oba) dominating leopards; c. 1530–1570; copper alloy; 37.5 × 19.1 cm (14 3/4 × 7 1/2 in.); Royal Bronze-casting Guild (Igun Eronmwon), Edo, Benin kingdom, Nigeria; Museum of Fine Arts, Boston (accession L-G 7.23.2012)

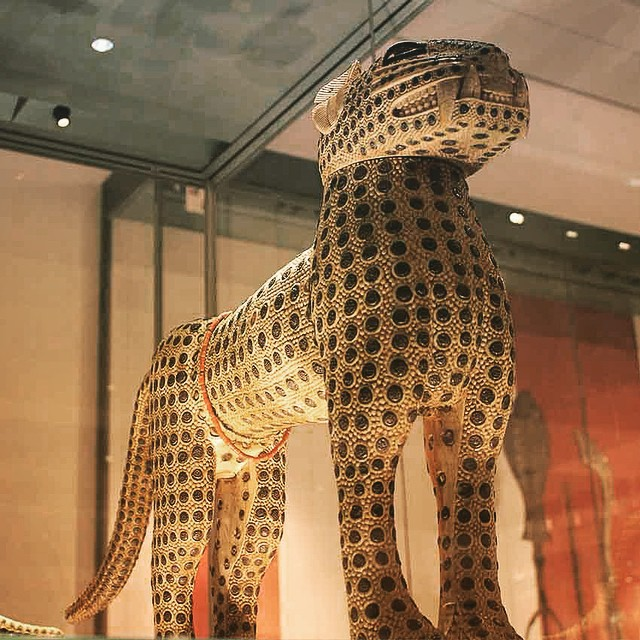
Carved leopards; 19th century; ivory with inlaid copper and bronze; Kingdom of Benin; Royal Collection Trust (RCIN 69926)

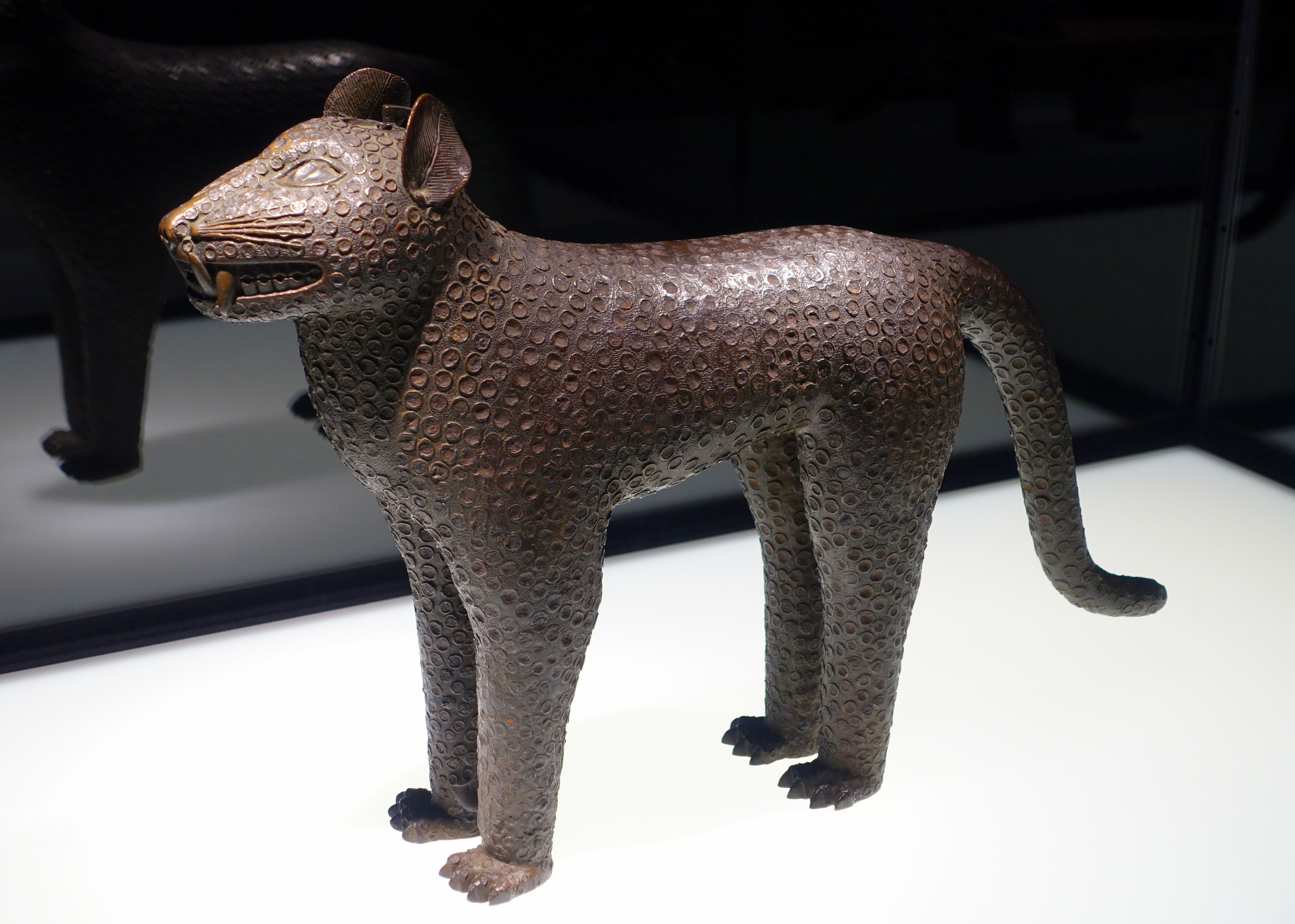
Leopard aquamanile; 17th century; brass; Ethnological Museum of Berlin (Germany)

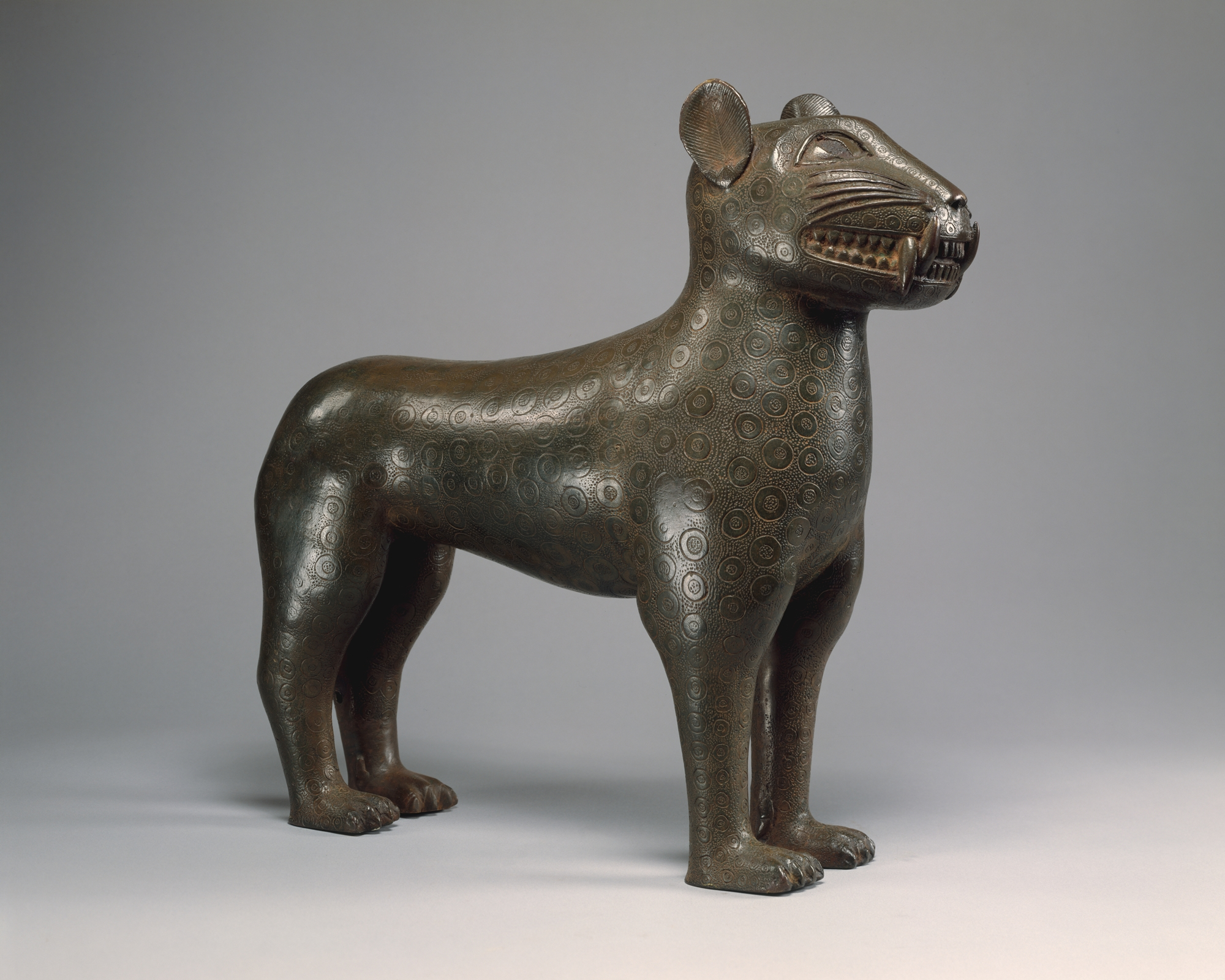
Figure of a leopard; 1550–1680; bronze; height: 39.4 cm (15 1/2 in.); Metropolitan Museum of Art (New York City)

== The Oba's regalia ==
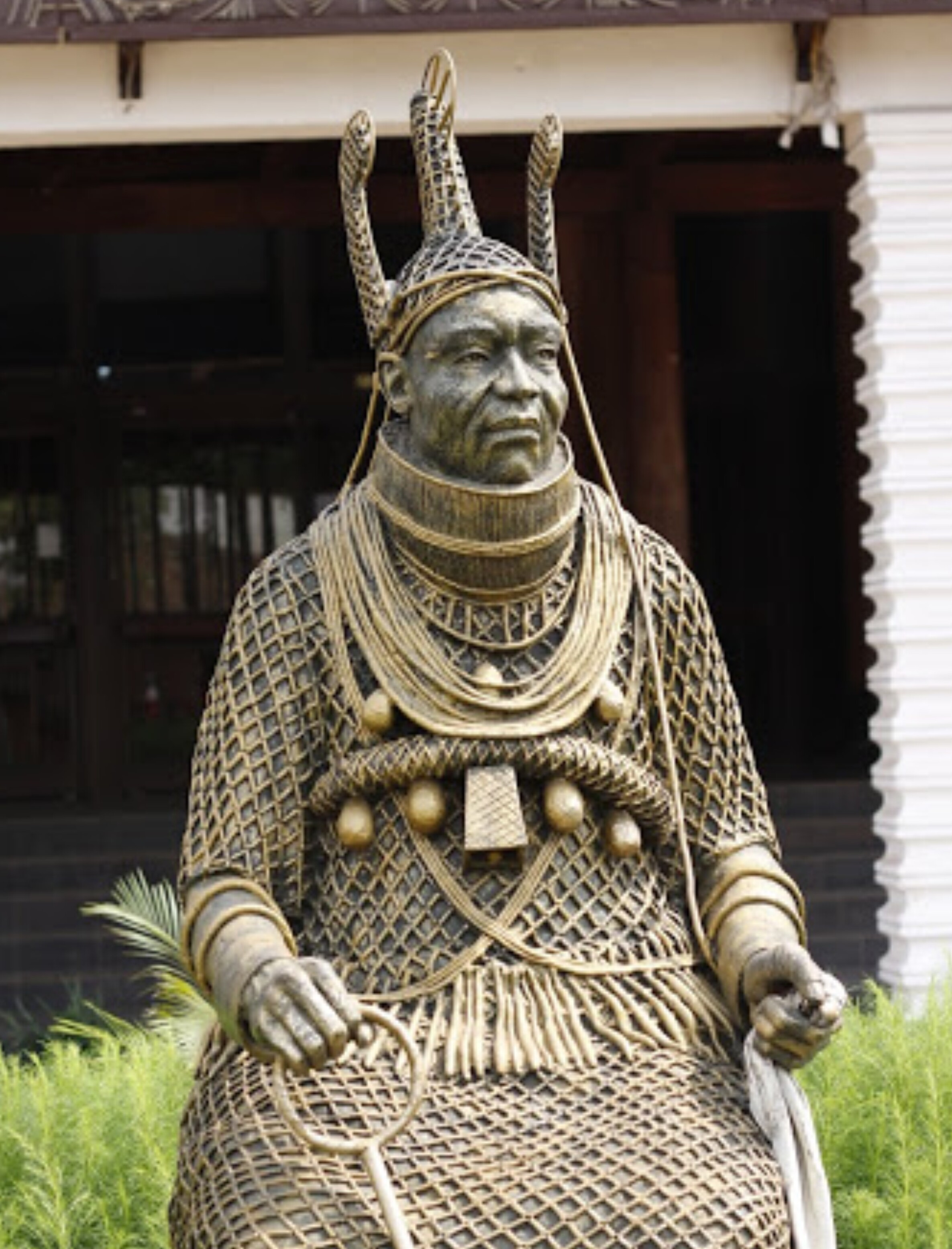
A modern sculpture at the National Library of Nigeria representing the Oba of Benin in his Regalia

The Oba's divine right to rule is reiterated in his regalia. His coral crowns, shirts, aprons, necklaces, and accessories refer to those that Oba Ewuare is said to have stolen from Olokun, the god of the waters and prosperity. Coral and red stones such as jasper and agate are also filled with supernatural energy, or ase, as are elephant ivory and brass, two other valuable materials that the Oba has historically controlled.

Despite his divine status, the Oba can not rule alone. He must rely on others to fulfill his destiny, a dependence that is physically expressed when he walks or sits with his arms supported at the elbows and wrists by attendants. They help him bear the weight of his regalia, a constant reminder of the burden of kingship.

== Brass casting ==
Brass casters (igun eronmwon) are the highest-ranking craft guild within the hierarchical structure of the Iwebo society, followed by blacksmiths (igun ematon) and ivory and wood carvers (igbesanwan).

The origins of brass casting in Benin are debated. One popular story credits Oba Oguola (enthroned c. 1280) with sending for a master brass caster from Ile Ife, the capital city of the Ancient Ife Kingdom to the northwest, and with later establishing a royal brass-casting guild. Others suggest brass casting developed independently in Benin and may have mutually benefited from exchange with Ile Ife. Casters in both regions used the lost wax method, in which a precisely detailed wax model is formed over a clay core. When the model is complete, clay is carefully applied over the wax. It is then heated, melting the wax, which exits from a narrow channel. Next, molten metal is poured into the mold. Once cool, the hardened clay is chipped away, leaving behind an image now cast in bronze.

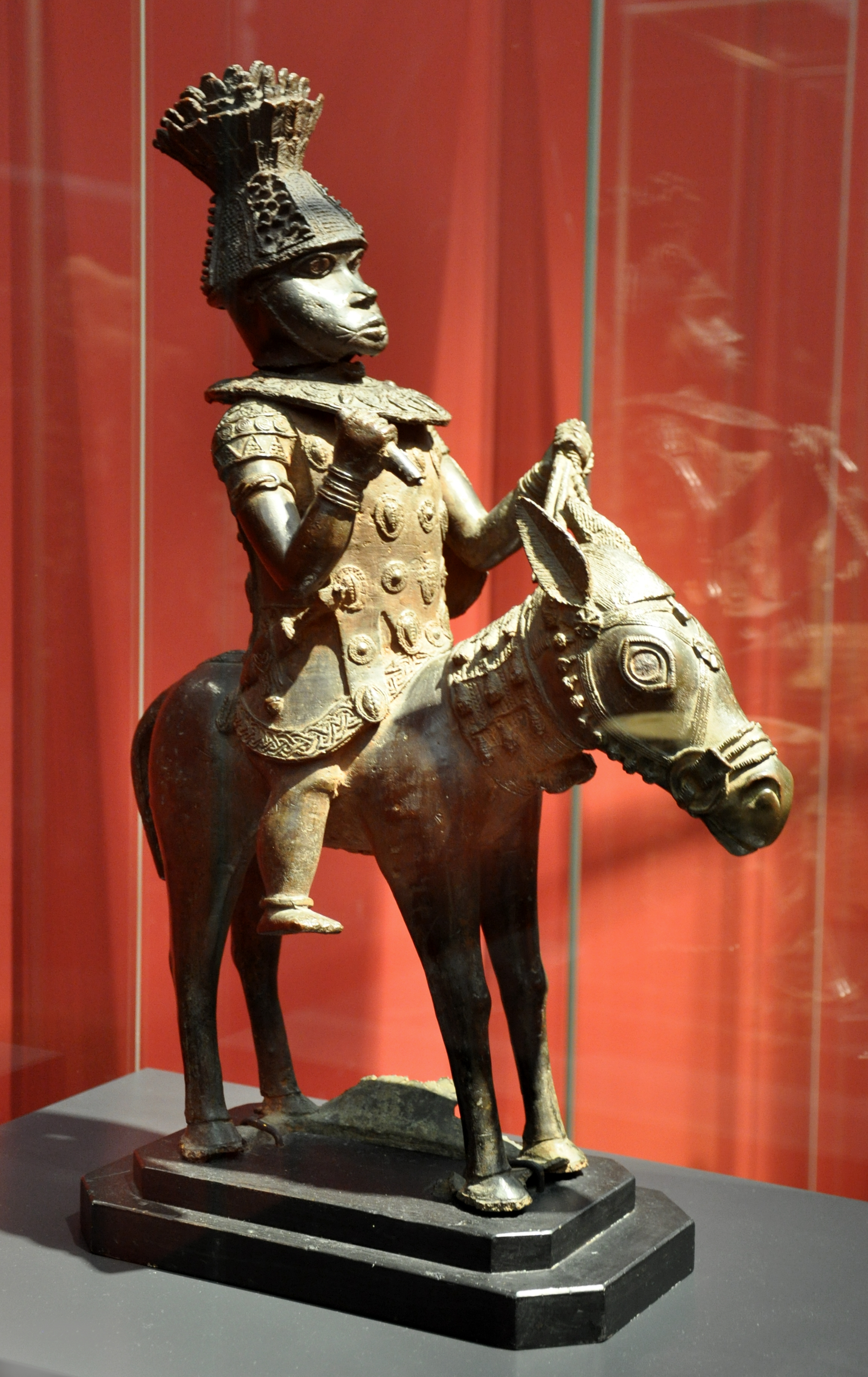
Horse and rider; 16–17th century; Rietberg Museum (Zürich, Switzerland)

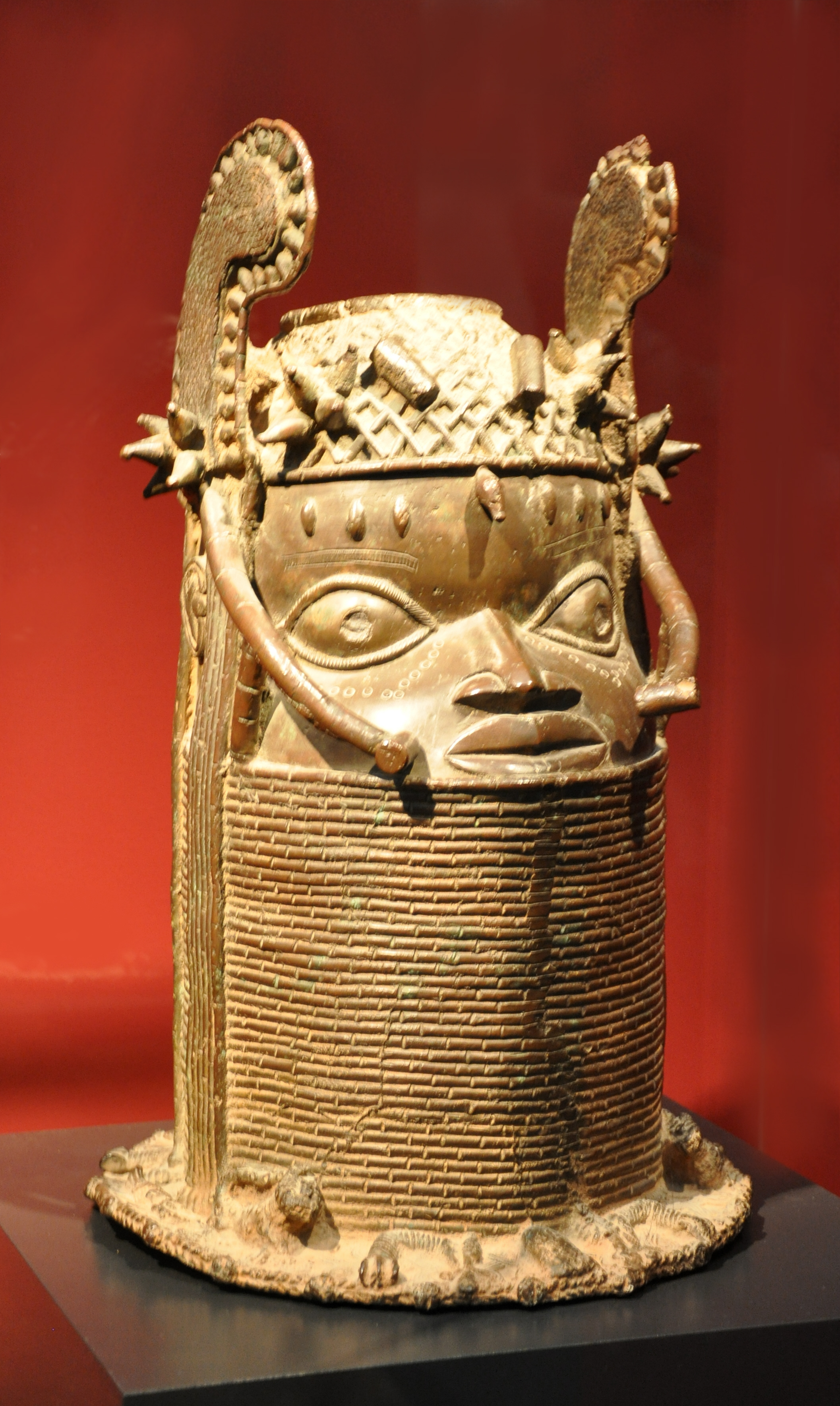
Portrait of the king Osemwende; circa 1810; Rietberg Museum

== British punitive expedition (1897) ==
The decline of Benin art occurred at the end of the 19th century when the Benin Expedition of 1897 by the British caused destruction of the city and its culture. On February 18, 1897, British forces arrived in Benin City to take reprisals for loss of trade representatives in a skirmish. The possessions of the Oba and his court became spoils of war. The objects were rounded up with little regard for their associated meaning; no systematic record was kept of their grouping or placement. Many of these objects were sold in London to defray the cost of the expedition.

In April 2021 Germany agreed to return to present-day Nigeria the Benin bronzes that their troops had looted from the Kingdom of Benin. In late 2021 the Smithsonian Museum of African Art in Washington DC removed the Benin bronzes that they have from display and they say they have plans to repatriate them.

== Contemporary issues surrounding the return of looted art ==
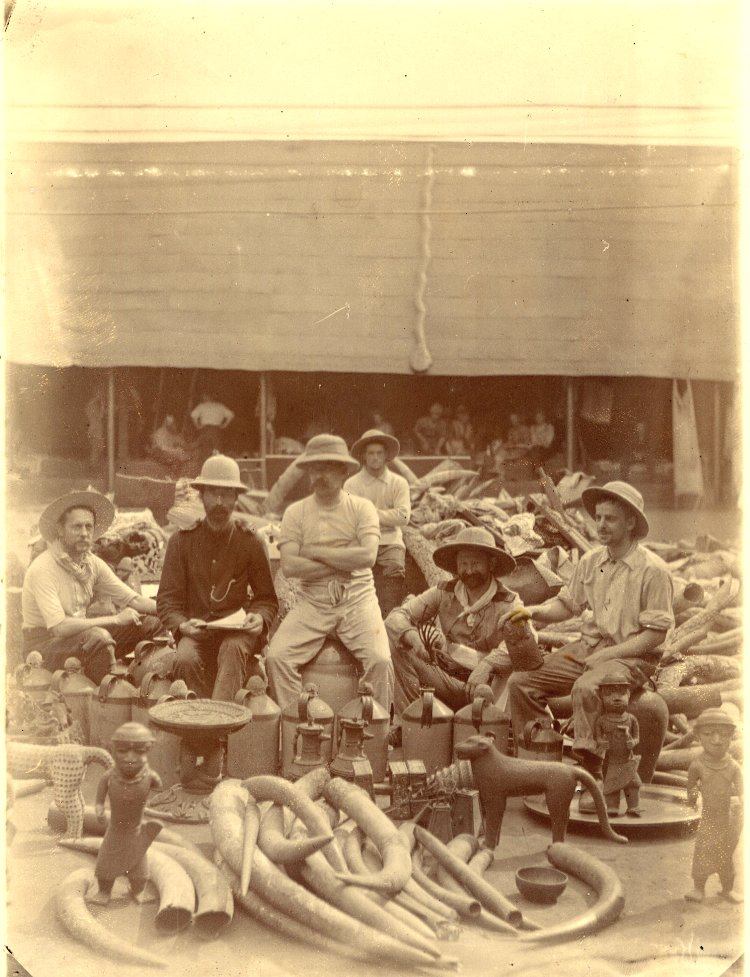
Looted objects from the Benin Punative Raid, 1897

After the British 1897 pillaged of Oba Ovonramwen’s compound in retaliation for the murder of British diplomats, most of pieces of Benin art were auctioned off in London. Today the Benin kingdom, located now in modern day Nigeria, is asking for its art objects back, which are spread across Western Countries such as Britain, Germany, and the United States. In 2007, western museums joined Nigeria in the "Benin Dialogue Group" to open discussion about the retrieval of the art pieces.

The movement slowed until the recent wave of the Black Lives Matter movement following the murder of George Floyd and subsequent protests. Many countries, universities, and museums have returned or promised to return their pieces. With the returning of the stolen work, many worry about the fate of the art, as there is now a battle for possession with Nigeria among three different parties: the descendant of the last oba, the current governor, Godwin Nogheghase Obaseki, and the federal government and state of Nigeria. The current oba believes that the royal family has legal claims to the artwork. Critics say that giving the artwork to a single family might not fare well since the royal family no longer has power.

Meanwhile, the governor has plans for a museum. Critics argue that once the current governor Godwin Nogheghase Obaseki leaves office in 2024 the museum plans will be abandoned. The state of Nigeria believes that it has the rightful claim to the artwork, but many fear that corruption and mismanagement in Nigerian governments, citing, for instance, the 1973 incident when the head of state at the time, General Yakubu Gowon, walked into the Nigerian National Museum in Lagos and took one of the Benin heads and gifted it to Queen Elizabeth; that piece remains today in the Royal Collection of Britain.

=== Restitution ===
Calls for the return of Benin's royal artworks began within the palace itself. Oba Eweka II raised the matter in the 1910s, and Oba Akenzua II renewed it in the 1930s, focusing on royal regalia such as ceremonial stools. The first formal request from the Nigerian state came in 1972, when Professor Ekpo Eyo, then Director of the Federal Department of Antiquities, wrote to European museums asking for the permanent loan of Benin Bronzes and related objects. European institutions largely ignored the request, insisting the artifacts had been acquired legally. Eyo went on to help draft international frameworks such as the 1970 UNESCO Convention on the Illicit Transfer of Cultural Property and the 1972 World Heritage Convention, laying groundwork that later restitution efforts would build on.

=== Diaspora advocacy in Britain ===
In the 1990s, restitution demands moved into the diaspora. Labour MP Bernie Grant founded the African Reparations Movement (ARM-UK) in 1993, after attending the Pan-African Conference on Reparations in Nigeria, to press Britain for redress over slavery and colonialism, including the return of African cultural heritage. The Benin Bronzes became a central focus of the campaign, with ARM-UK investigating British museum collections and formally requesting their return; in 1997, Glasgow Museums rejected one such request.

A major legal obstacle throughout this period was the British Museum Act of 1963, which barred museums from deaccessioning objects except in narrow circumstances, giving institutions legal cover to refuse restitution claims. This barrier stood until the Charities Act of 2022 allowed trustees to weigh returns on moral grounds.

=== The Benin Dialogue Group ===
The Benin Dialogue Group was established in 2007 as a forum bringing together Nigerian representatives and European museums holding Benin artworks, with the aim of planning a museum in Nigeria that could permanently display returned objects. It held its first meeting in Vienna in 2010, bringing delegates from major European collections together with representatives of the Oba's court and Nigeria's National Commission for Museums and Monuments (NCMM).

Reconciling differing expectations proved difficult: Nigerian stakeholders pressed for permanent repatriation, while many European museums initially preferred long-term loans. Even so, the group produced several concrete outcomes over the following decade, including agreements on the restitution of significant numbers of Benin Bronzes in the 2020s, plans for a new museum in Benin City, and the creation of an online database, Digital Benin, documenting collections scattered around the world.

=== Digital Benin ===
At its sixth session, held in Benin City in July 2019 at the invitation of Edo State Governor Godwin Obaseki, the Dialogue Group agreed that a documentation project would be hosted by the Museum am Rothenbaum (MARKK) in Hamburg. This became Digital Benin, a database bringing together information on Benin artworks held across more than 130 institutions in 20 countries, including oral histories, maps, and provenance details.

To address the loss of language and generational knowledge tied to the looted objects, the project set up a research space in Benin City called Ẹyo Otọ ("foundation"), which drew on Edo oral tradition and naming practices so that objects could be presented under their original Edo designations rather than museum catalogue names. Built with mobile access in mind, given that mobile phones are the primary means of internet access in Nigeria, the database has since been used by local communities, including bronze casters and students, as an educational resource.

=== Museum of West African Art ===
The same 2019 session proposed a new museum in Benin City to reunite Benin artifacts dispersed abroad and to showcase the kingdom's history from its earliest archaeological evidence to contemporary work. This became the Museum of West African Art (MOWAA), which has partnered with institutions such as the National Gallery of Art and the Centre for Black and African Arts and Civilization to strengthen conservation training and preservation practice. Oba Ewuare II initially supported the project, but later withdrew his backing amid disagreements over where restituted bronzes should be housed, a dispute that has shaped debate over the museum's role since it opened.

=== Provenance research in the Netherlands ===
In 2020, the Netherlands established an Advisory Committee on the Return of Cultural Objects from Colonial Contexts, encouraging Dutch museums to be more transparent about the origins of their collections. The Wereldmuseum joined the Benin Dialogue Group that same year and began provenance research into its Benin holdings, work carried out by Rosalie Hans, Henrietta Lidchi, and Annette Schmidt in partnership with the NCMM. The findings, published in 2021 as Provenance #2: The Benin Collections at the National Museum of World Cultures, acknowledged the colonial-era looting of the objects and their cultural significance to their communities of origin.

==== Nigeria's formal demand and the Dutch decision ====
On 13 September 2022, the NCMM submitted a formal application to the Dutch State Secretary for Culture and Media requesting the restitution of 119 Benin artifacts held by the Wereldmuseum, whose provenance had been traced to the British sacking of Benin City in 1897. The Dutch government referred the request to its Committee Colonial Collections, which issued a positive recommendation in January 2023 based on the Wereldmuseum's own provenance research.

Negotiations continued through 2023: in February, the Wereldmuseum's Director of Content, Wayne Modest, voiced support for the restitution policy, and by May the NCMM had confirmed its application and stated it had no further questions about the provenance report. In July 2023, State Secretary Gunay Uslu publicly announced the restitution, framing it as part of the Netherlands' responsibility to confront its colonial past. Nigeria's government, under President Bola Ahmed Tinubu, welcomed the decision.

A dispute then arose in Nigeria between Oba Ewuare II and the Edo State Governor over whether the returned bronzes should be kept at the Royal Palace or at MOWAA, prompting the Oba to withdraw his support for the museum. To settle the matter, Nigeria's federal government signed a Memorandum of Understanding with the Oba in 2024, formally recognising his ownership of the returned bronzes while assigning the NCMM responsibility for their storage and conservation, including at the newly built Oba Ovonramwen facility in Benin City.

Amid this dispute, the Committee Colonial Collections revisited its recommendation. In June 2024 it consulted the Wereldmuseum's Mirjam Hoijtink and Annette Schmidt, who reaffirmed the case for restitution and pointed to the museum's participation in the Benin Dialogue Group since 2010. The NCMM reconfirmed its application in September 2024, and the committee formally upheld its original recommendation the following month.

==== Return of the 119 Benin Bronzes ====
On 21 June 2025, the Netherlands formally handed over the 119 artifacts to Nigeria, the largest single repatriation of Benin objects to date. The collection, dating from the 16th to 18th centuries, included metal and ivory sculptures looted during the 1897 British expedition. Olugbile Holloway, Director-General of the National Commission for Museums and Monuments, described the returned works as embodiments of the identity of the people from whom they were taken.

Oba Ewuare II and the National Commission for Museums and Monuments received the bronzes; four were placed on permanent display at the National Museum in Lagos, while the rest went into storage at the Oba Ovonramwen facility in Benin City for conservation. The return drew concerns over conservation capacity and reports of an attempted misappropriation, which the Oba said had been prevented. It was nonetheless widely regarded as a milestone in restitution and cultural sovereignty, placing Nigeria alongside Germany, the United Kingdom, and the United States among countries that have returned significant Benin holdings in recent years.
