= Ukpe-okhue =

The ukpe-okhue (Edo for "parrot's beak") is a crown traditionally worn by the Iyoba (queen mother) of the Oba of Benin. It is formed of a snood-like net of precious coral beadwork, using ileke ("royal") cylindrical beads.

This type of crown was originated, and first worn, by the original queen mother Idia, the first woman granted the privilege to wear ileke beads.

Named after a parrot's beak, it is a pointed hat, with its shape somewhat resembling a Phrygian cap with its point curving forward.

== Gallery ==
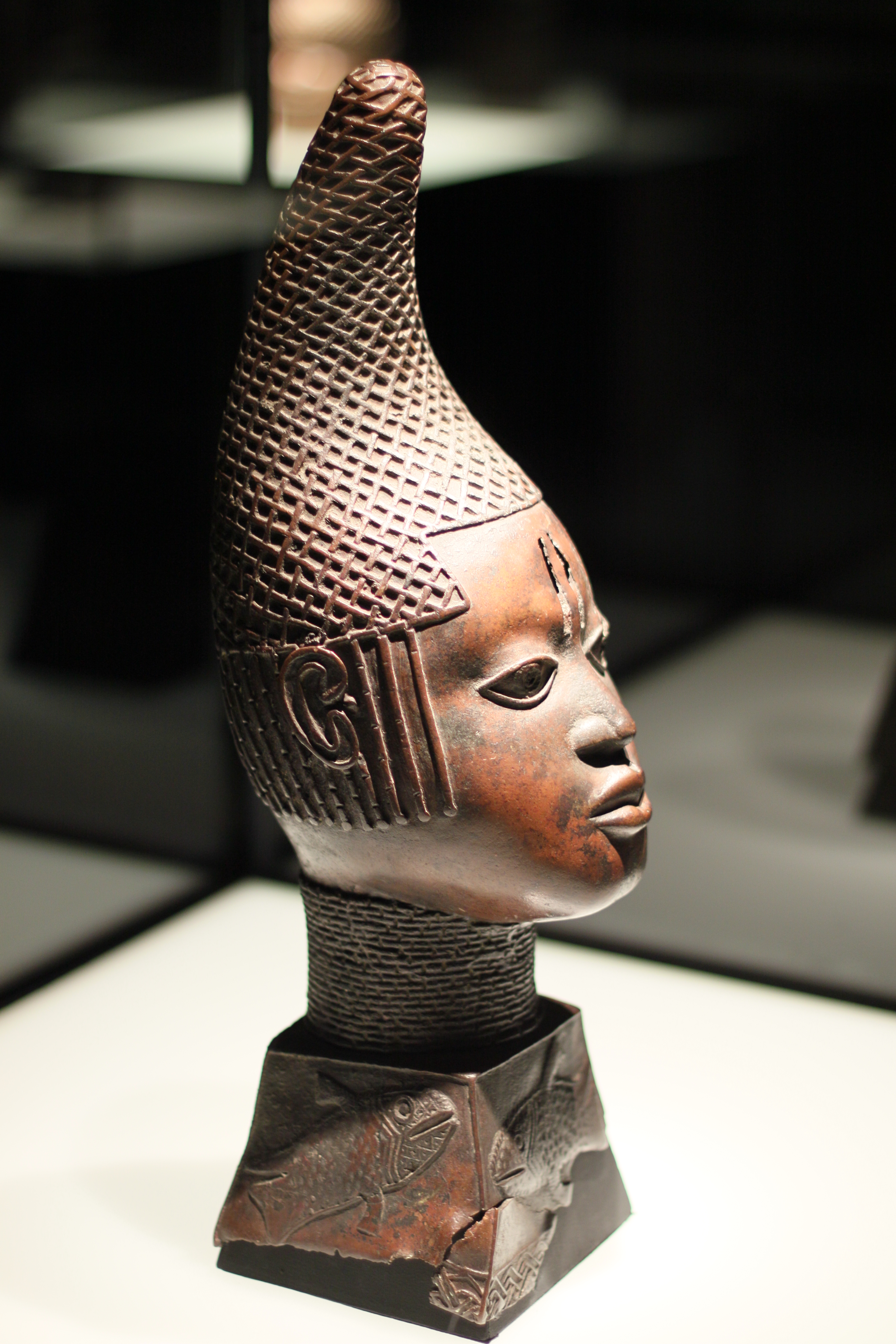

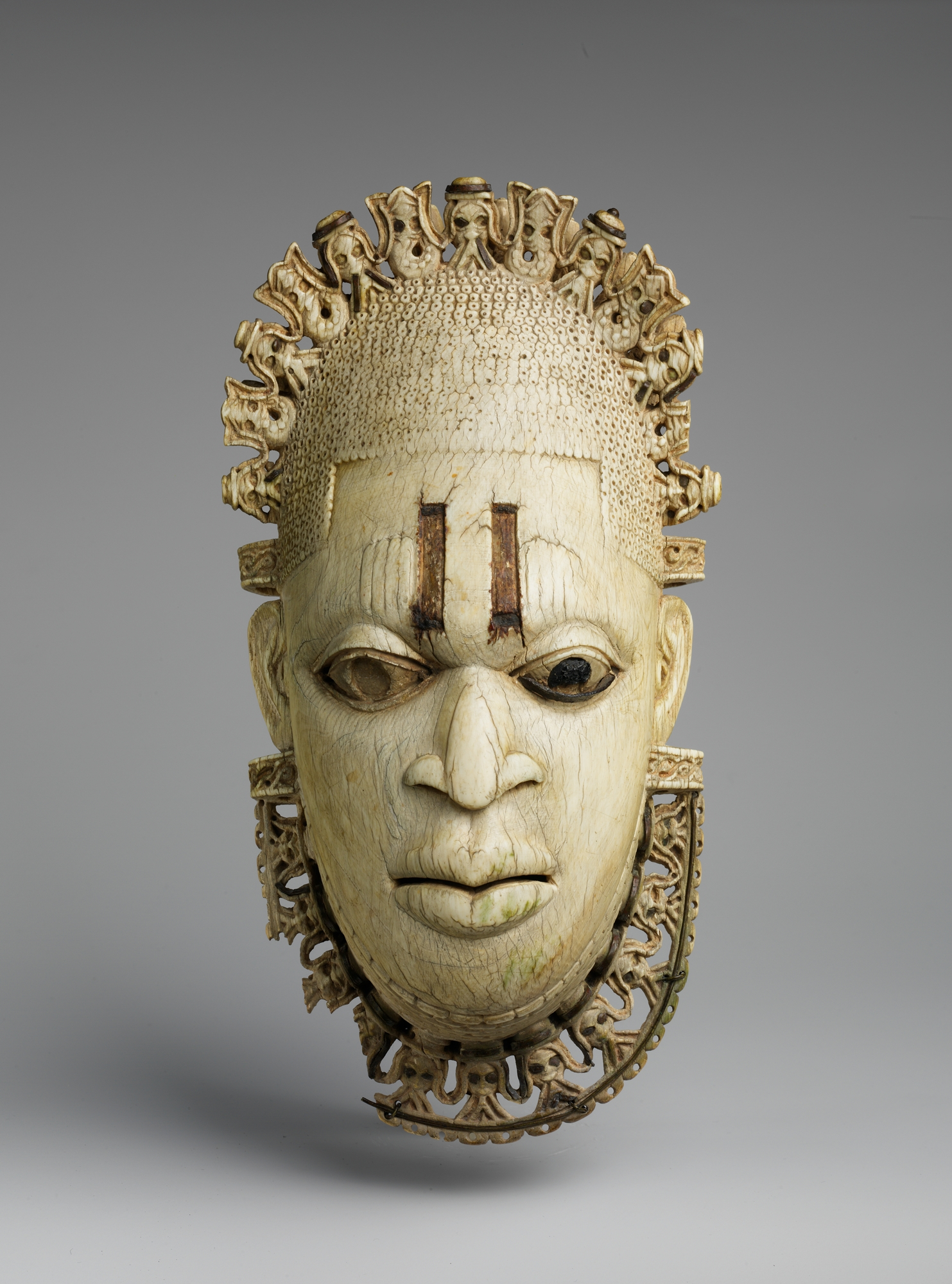
