= Odigba =

Accessories in Yoruba culture

Odigba, also known as Edigba and Ejigba, (Yoruba: Òdìgbà, Èdìgbà, Èjìgbà) is the name for a bound collection of cylindrical beaded strings, collars, necklaces or rope accessories in the Yoruba culture. The word anatomy of the term comes from the article pieces: -Odi/Edi; (The bound or tied), and -Igba; (Collar or cord), while that of its alternative term Ejigba comes from; -Eji; (Double), and -Igba; (Collar or cord).

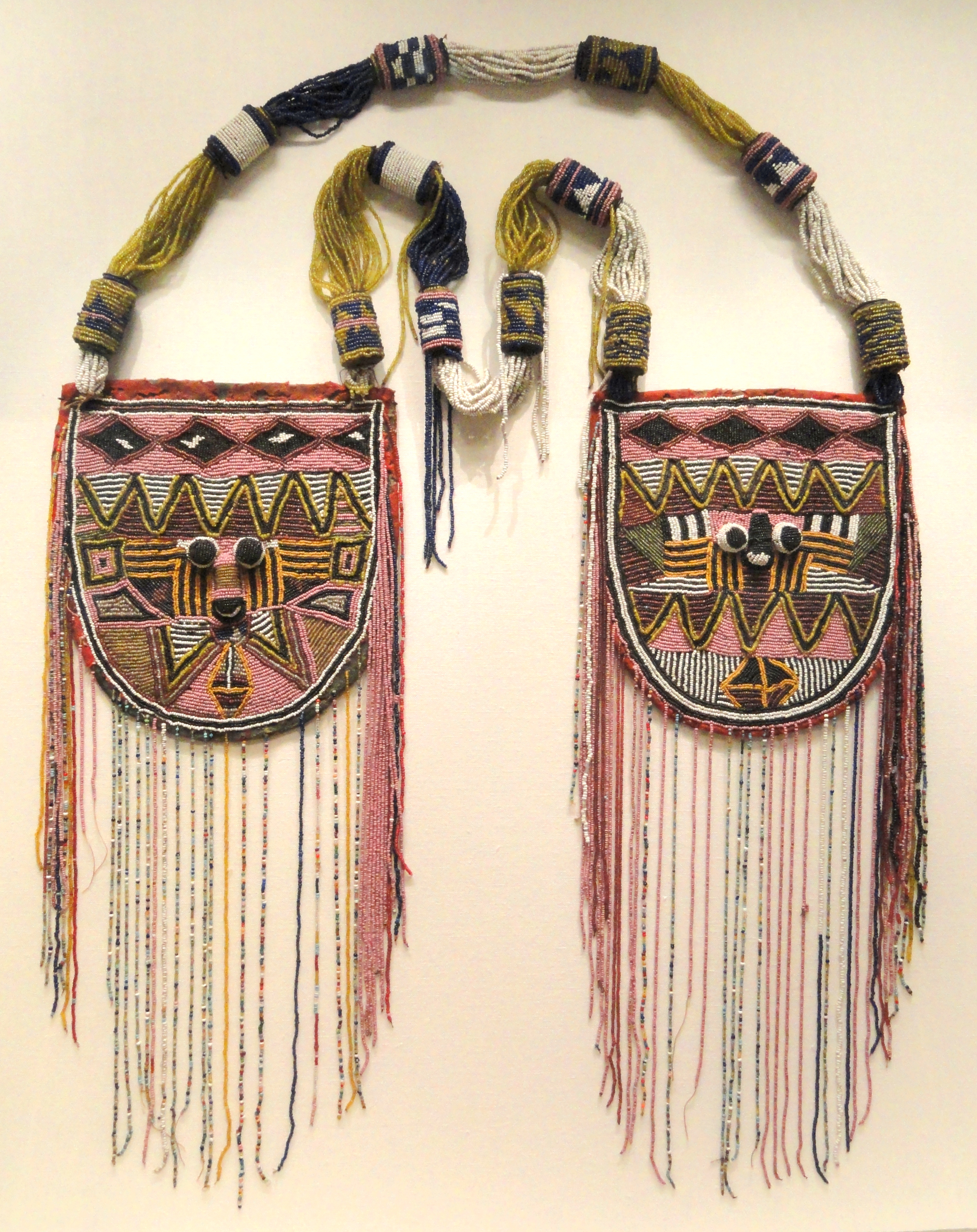
Ifa necklace strings (Odigba Ileke Ifa) with two beaded bags, 1900s, Guinea Coast, Nigeria, Yoruba people, cloth, glass beads, wood.

== Description ==
An Odigba is not a single string of beads, but the collection of individual necklaces bound and held together into a larger piece of collar. It might also come made with a long hanging pouch, bag or bags also made from beads or beautifully embroidered leather which would hang as a sash or baldric belt across one or both (opposite) sides of the torso/hip of the wearer to form a double cross strap. When the Odigba is used in this fashion on a single shoulder across the torso, it is called Ogbara. However, when it is sashed across both shouders, it is called Ejigbara (lit: Double strap body holder/retainer).

== Function ==
There are different types depending on their use or function. Those used by royals are more commonly known as Odigba Oba or Odigba ileke. Odigba Oba are usually of a carnelian or warm reddish-amber color. When used in this form, the Odigba can be aptly described as the collar or chain of office.

Together with the Ade (Oba's crown), Opa ase (Staff of authority) and Ada (Sword of state), it is one of the most important items an Oba possesses.

Those used by Babalawo, diviners or priests are known by the name; Odigba Ifa. The types of beads most commonly used in the stringing include glass, wood, and coral. Oftentimes, the materials from which an Odigba is made have ritual significances or represent important symbolisms such as 'longevity' and 'perpetuity', (Atọ́). They might also be infused / treated with various herbs and the pouches may contain potions which are believed to offer protective powers to the wearer.

They come in different shapes, forms and designs reflecting different tastes which varies across Yorubaland and areas influenced by Yoruba culture.

When used as accessories, the Odigba also signifies the importance, or heralds the status of the Oba or titled member of society wearing it, and usually, the thicker the Odigba, the higher the rank. Originally, beaded objects or materials were the reserve for kings and other high-ranking members of society, most especially Ojoye/Ijoye (chiefs). However, the babalawo, who are seen in society as the fathers of mysteries, guardians of Yoruba esoteric knowledge and the conduit between the physical and the otherworldly can also own Odigba, elevating their own political statuses by so doing.

== Name variations ==
The Odigba is also known by other names among the Yoruba, including Ejigba, Edigba, Ojigba and Ejigbara.

== See also ==
- Oba (ruler)
- Oba's crown
- Yoruba art
