= Bronze Head of Queen Idia =

Bronze sculpture from the Kingdom of Benin

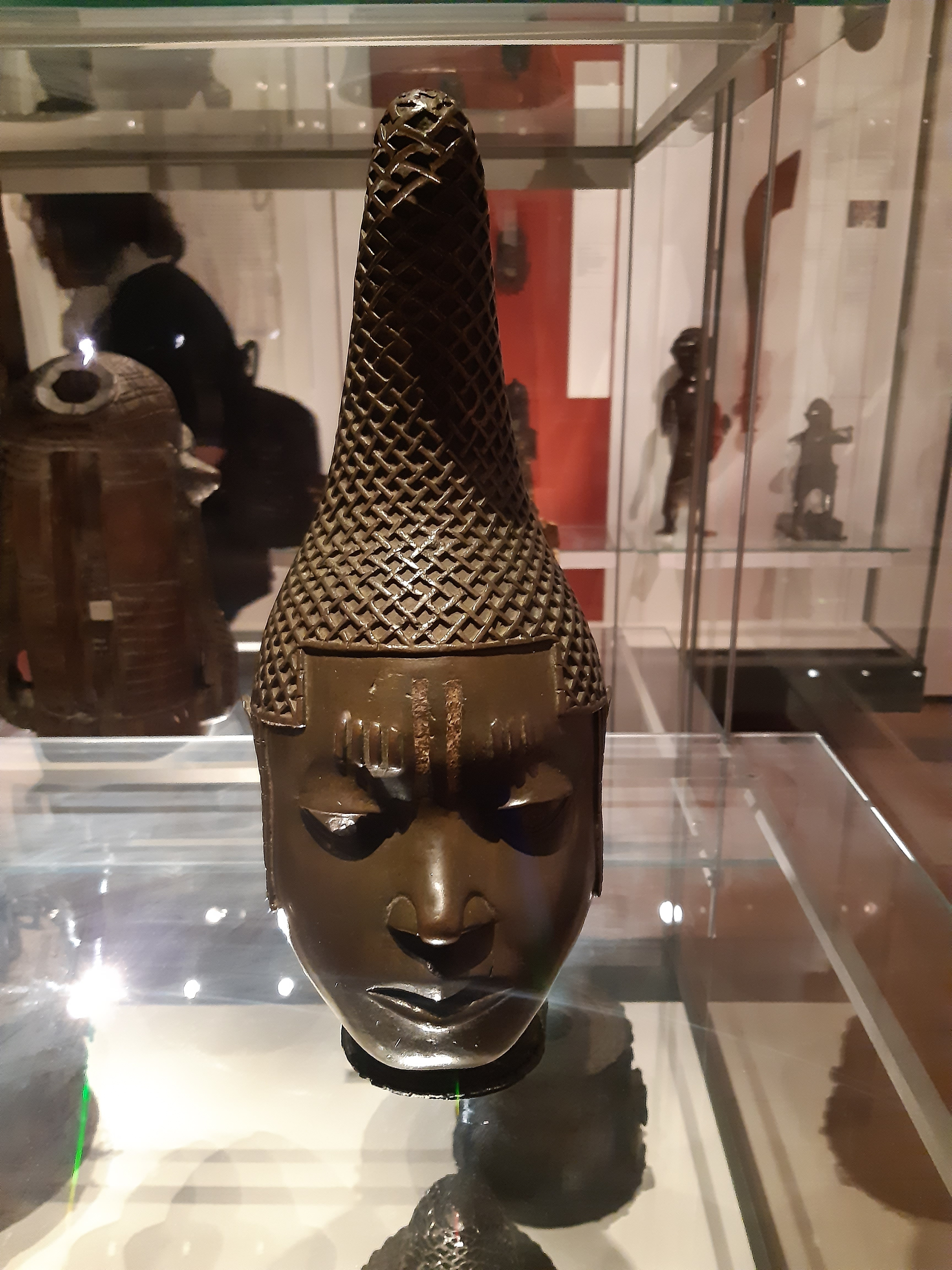
- The head, on display at the British Museum.
- Material: "Bronze", actually Brass and Iron.
- Size: height:41 cm (16 in) width:15.5 cm (6.1 in) depth:17.5 cm (6.9 in)
- Weight: 3.9 kg (8.6 lb)
- Created: Sixteenth century AD
- Discovered: Benin City
- Present location: British Museum
- Registration: Af1897,1011.1
- Culture: Benin Court Art
- Description applies to only one of four, similar, works believed to depict the same individual.

The Bronze Head of Queen Idia is a commemorative bronze head from the medieval Kingdom of Benin in West Africa that probably represents Idia, mother of Oba Esigie, made during the early sixteenth century at the Benin court. Many Benin works of art entered the European art market after the Benin Expedition of 1897 – Four cast bronze heads of the queen are known and are currently in the collections of the British Museum in London, the World Museum in Liverpool, the Nigerian National Museum in Lagos, and the Ethnological Museum of Berlin.

== Description ==
The bronze head was made using the lost wax casting technique in the early sixteenth century. It is a very realistic representation of a young woman from the Benin court, who wears a high pointed ukpe-okhue crown of lattice-shaped red coral beads. The hairstyle is referred to as a "parrot's beak" hairstyle and was only allowed to be worn by the Iyoba and the major war chief.

The eyes and two bands between them are inset with iron. These reflect the oral tale of how Idia came to be the Iyoba; the tale states that an oracle had told Idia to place medicine on two incisions above her eyes in order to prevent the Oba Ozolua from picking her for his wife. Oba Ozolua then went on to defeat the oracle's premonitions and Idia became the mother of Oba Esigie. Above each eyebrow are engraved four cicatrices. The sophisticated technique and design of the four heads suggest that they were made in the early sixteenth century, commissioned by Idia's son Oba Esigie, and created by the imperial guild of brass-casters that was founded by the previous Oba, Oba Ogolua. The heads were designed to honour her military achievements and ceremonial power.

== Gallery ==
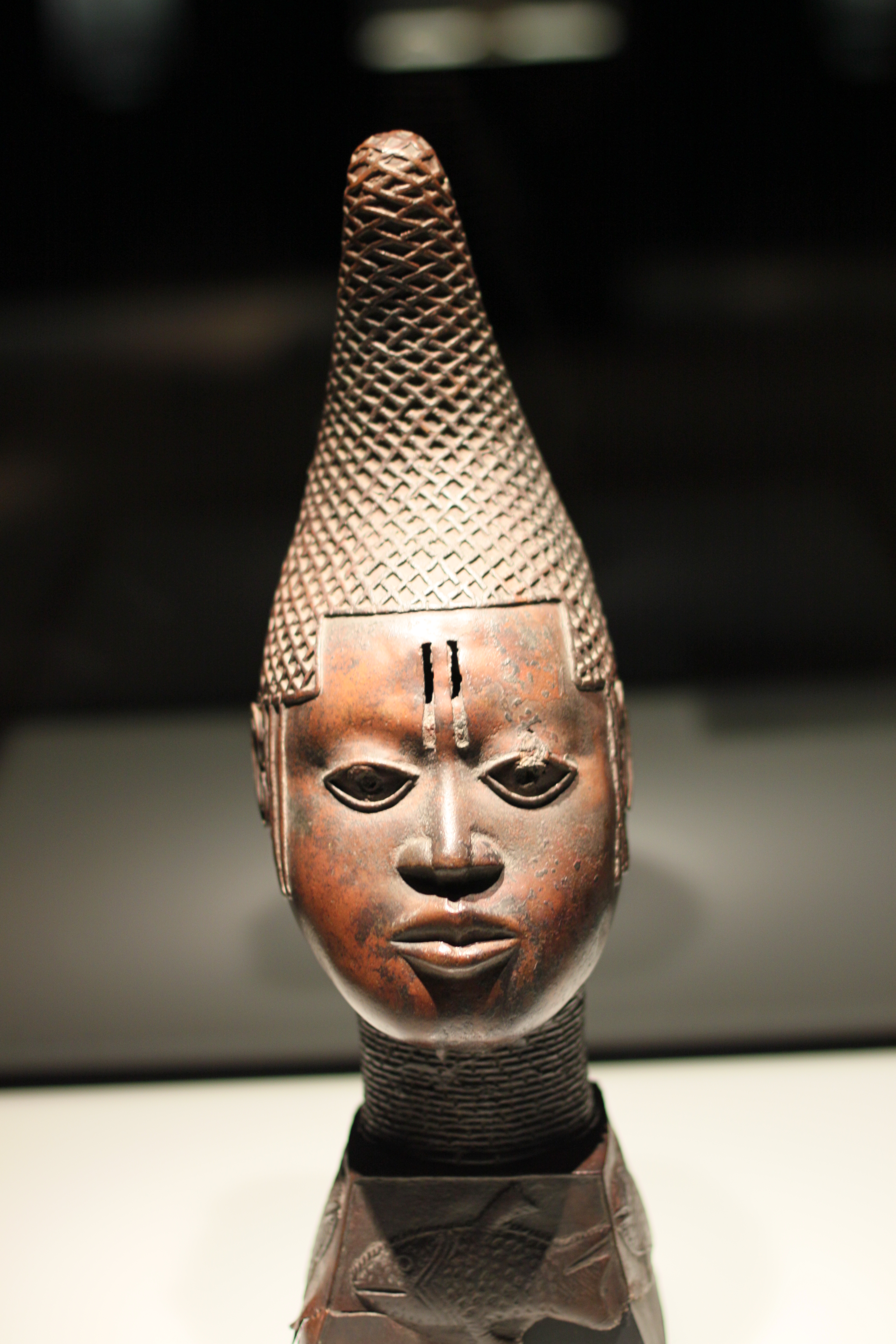
Early-16th-century cast copper-alloy commemorative head of an Iyoba ('queen mother'). Its date and iconography suggest that it may represent Idia, the first iyoba; Benin oral tradition interprets the fish reliefs on its base as an allusion the part she took in driving an invading Igala army back across the Niger River.

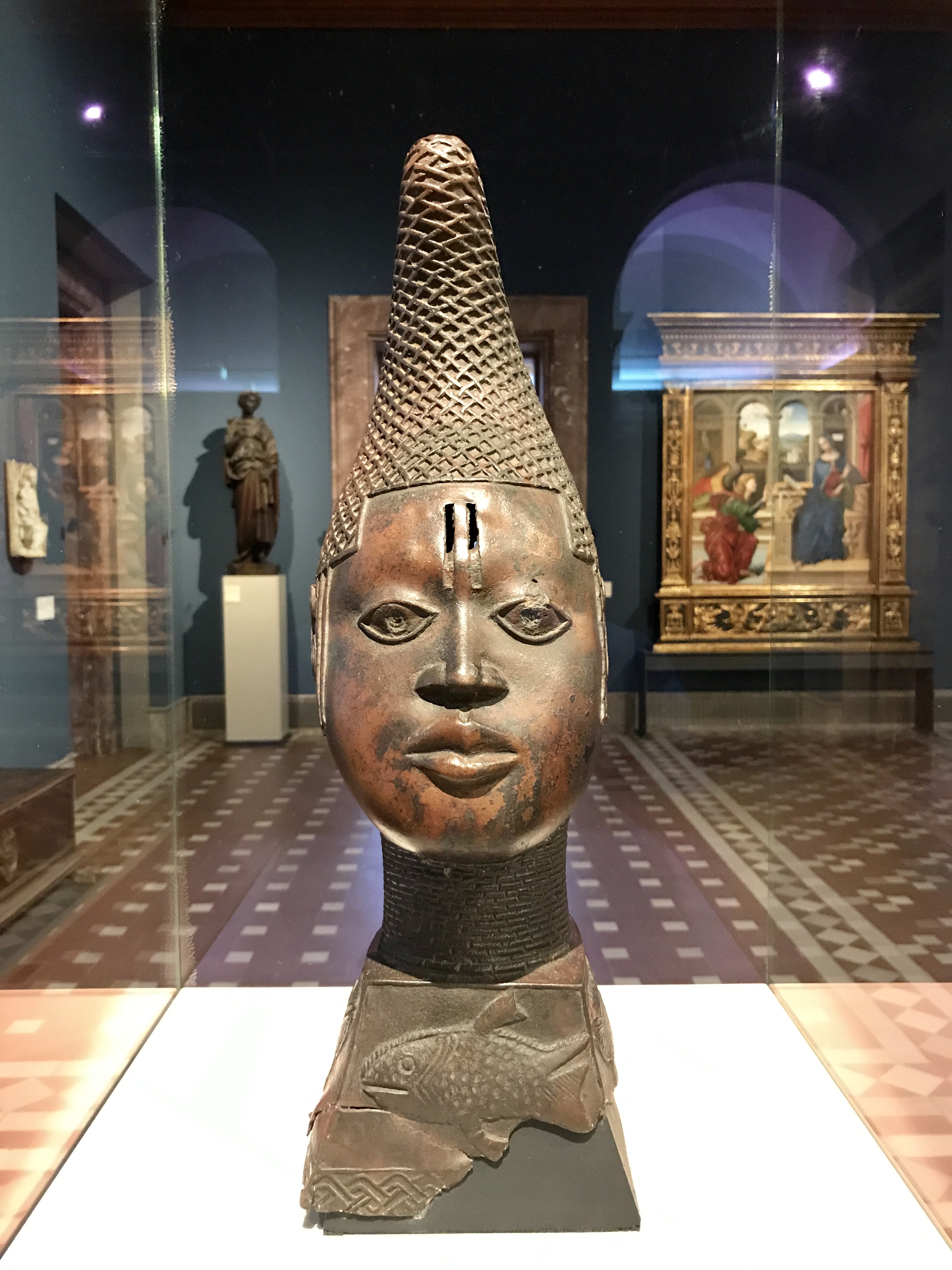
Early-16th-century commemorative head of an Iyoba, possibly representing Idia. This view shows the head's latticework crown, beaded collar and fish reliefs on its damaged base.

== Original use ==
Queen Idia played an instrumental role in her son's successful military campaigns against neighbouring tribes and factions. After her death, Oba Esigie ordered dedicatory heads of the queen to be made, to be placed in front of altars or in the Queen Mother's palace. The heads were designed to honour her military achievements and ceremonial power.

The British Museum head was presented to the museum by Sir William Ingram in 1897.

== See also ==
- Benin Bronzes
- Benin ivory mask
- Bronze Head from Ife
