= Benin ivory mask =

Pair of ivory pendant masks from Benin Kingdom

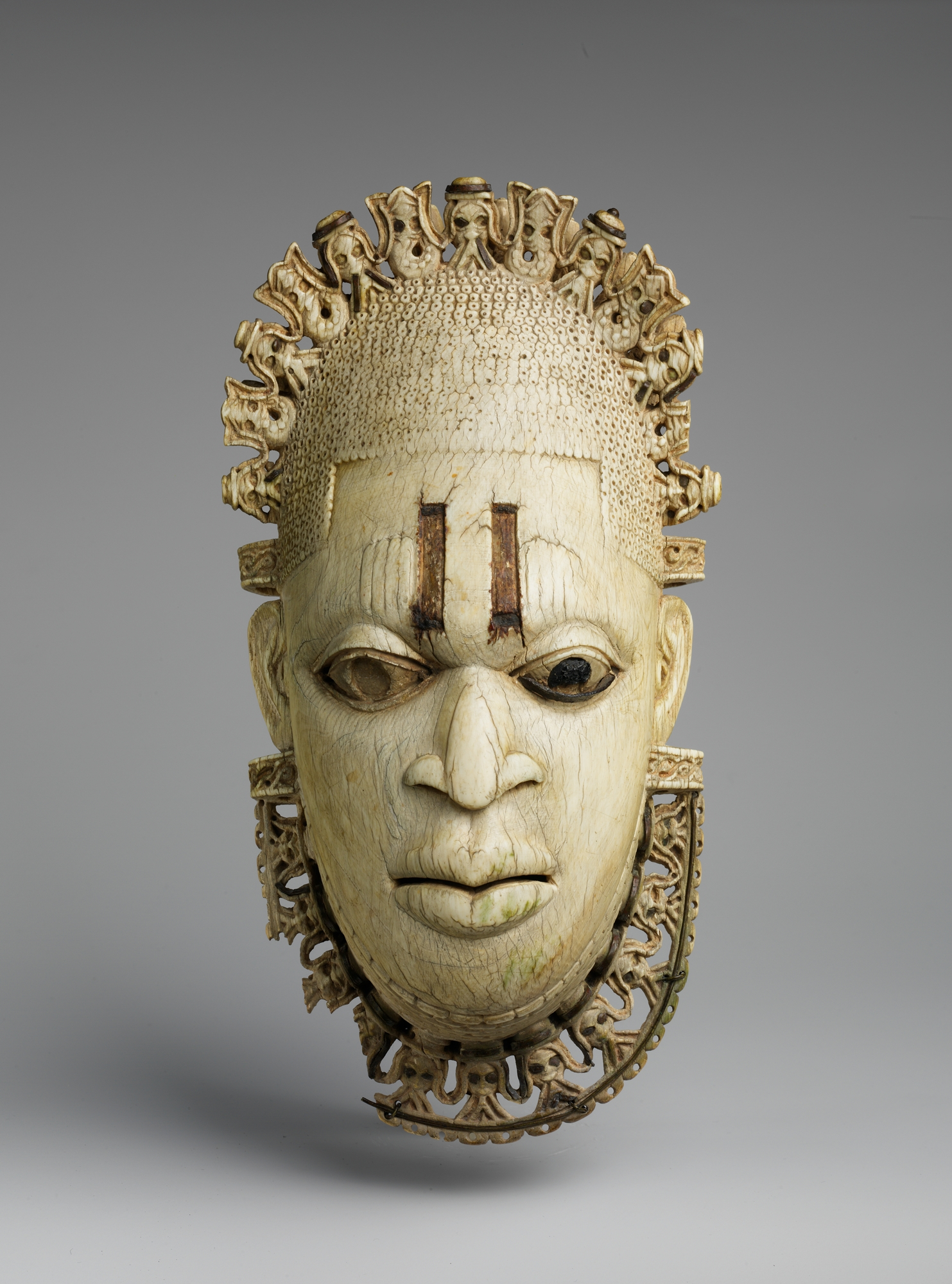
- One of four related ivory pendant masks, taken during the punitive expedition of 1897.
- Material: Ivory, iron inlay
- Height: 24.5cm
- Width: 12.5cm
- Depth: 6cm
- Created: Sixteenth century AD
- Discovered: Benin City
- Present location: Metropolitan Museum of Art, British Museum, Seattle Art Museum, Linden Museum, private collection
- Registration: 1978.412.323, Af1910,0513.1, 81.17.493, F 50565
- Culture: Benin Court Art
- Measurements are from the British Museum version; other versions have slightly different dimensions.

The Benin ivory mask is a miniature sculptural portrait in ivory of Idia, the first Iyoba (Queen Mother) of the 16th century Benin Empire, taking the form of a traditional African mask. The masks were looted by the British from the palace of the Oba of Benin in the Benin Expedition of 1897.

Two almost identical masks are kept at the British Museum in London and at the Metropolitan Museum of Art in New York City. Both feature a serene face of the Queen Mother wearing a beaded headdress, a beaded choker at her neck, scarification highlighted by iron inlay on the forehead, all framed by the flange of an openwork tiara and collar of symbolic beings, as well as double loops at each side for attachment of the pendant.

Until its restitution in 2022 to Nigeria, the Linden Museum in Germany had such a mask in its collection. Further, there are also similar masks at the Seattle Art Museum and one in a private collection.

The British Museum example in particular has also become a cultural emblem of modern Nigeria since FESTAC 77, a major pan-African cultural festival held in Lagos, Nigeria in 1977, which chose as its official emblem a replica of the mask crafted by Erhabor Emokpae.

== Origins ==
=== Three of the ivory masks ===
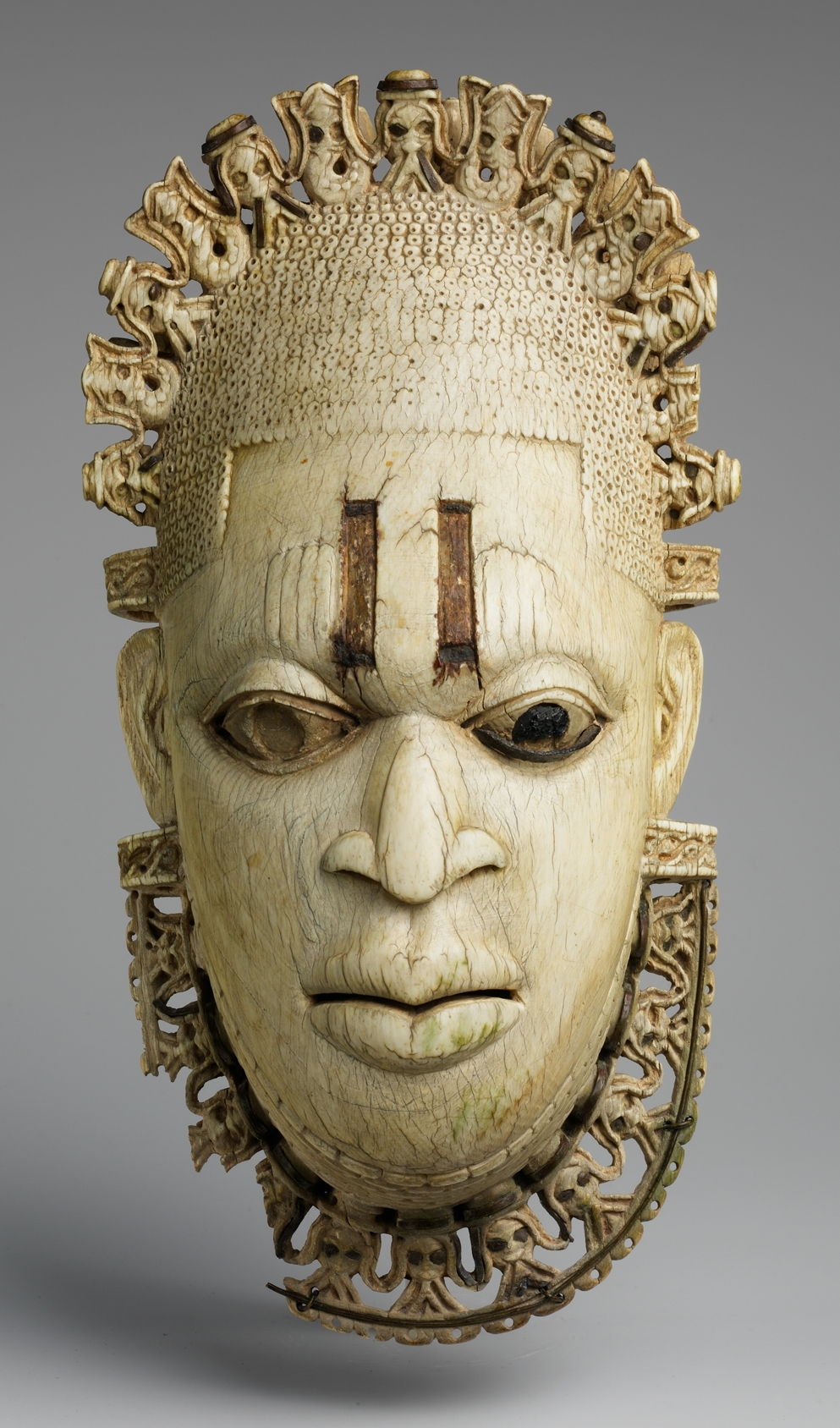
Metropolitan Museum of Art, New York

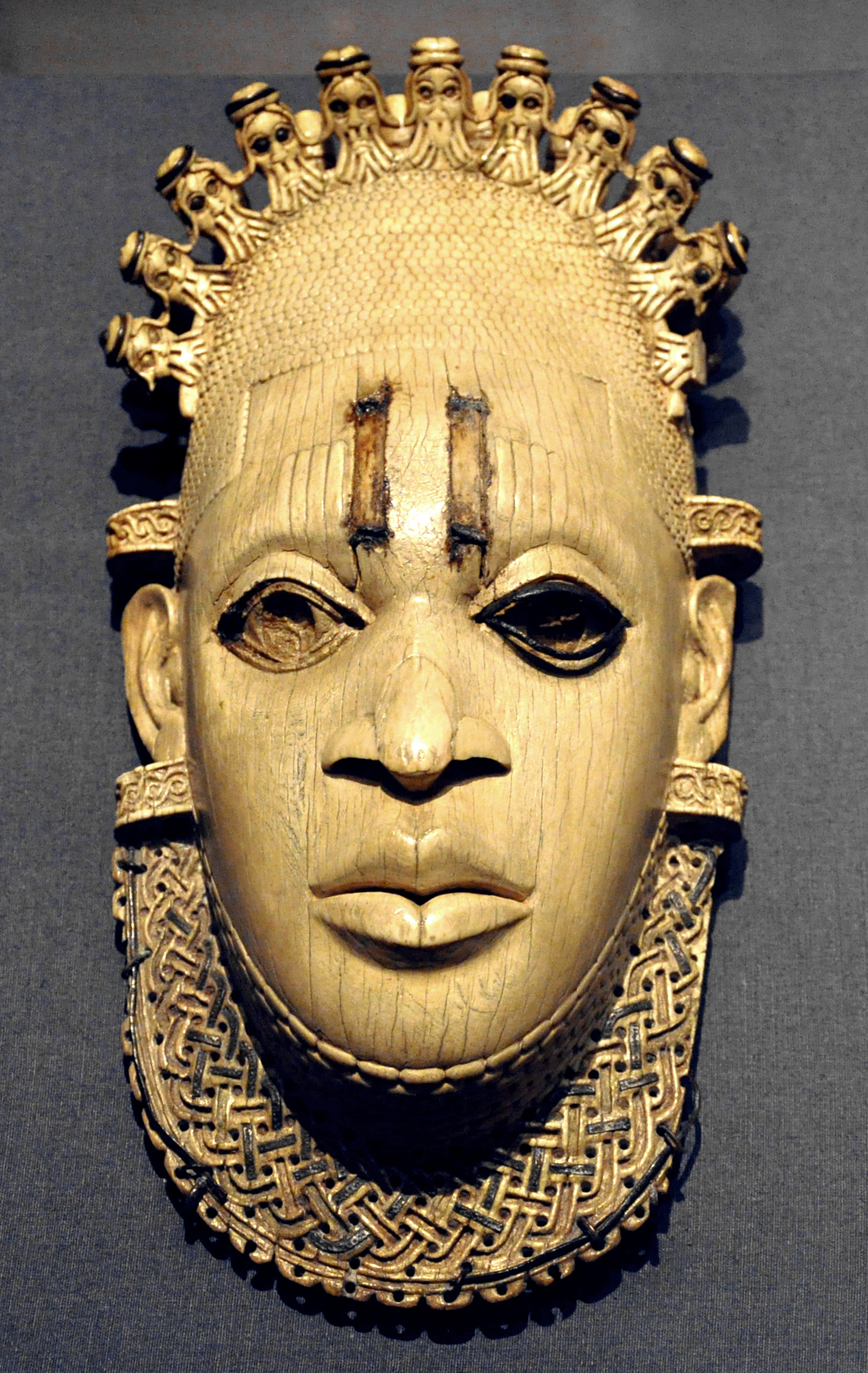
British Museum, London

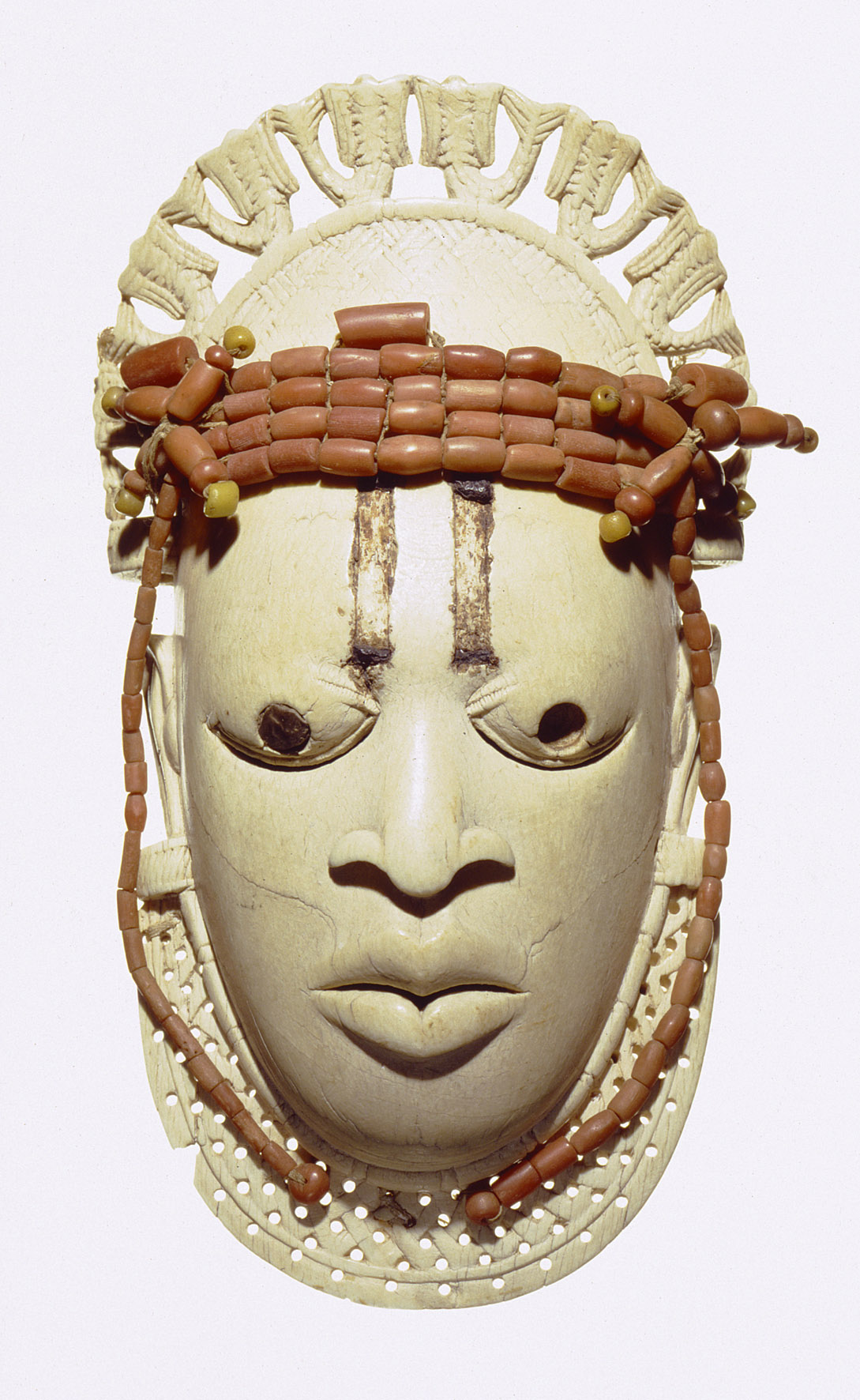
National Commission for Museums and Monuments, Nigeria (formerly Linden Museum, Stuttgart)

=== Benin Empire ===
In the early 16th century, the dynamic Esigie ruled the Benin Empire of the Edo people as its Oba. He came to power as Portuguese explorers first made contact with the empire. The empire traded pepper, ivory, local textiles, and slaves for brass and coral beads. Esigie engaged in two major conflicts. First, his half-brother fought a protracted civil war over the line of succession that would crown Esigie, the firstborn. Second, Esigie successfully defended against an invasion from the northern Igala Kingdom and captured their leader. Esigie rewarded his key political and mystical advisor during these trials, his mother Idia, with the title of Iyoba (Queen Mother)—the first in a tradition of Queen Mother advisors. The identification with Idia was made by Oba Akenzua II in the mid-20th century.

=== Ritual use ===
The Oba of Benin commissioned works from his guild of ivory and wood carvers, the Igbesanmwan. Their works were customized for their ruler, between the material connotations of ivory and the visual motifs in the carvings. At least two of the masks feature Portuguese imagery (although this imagery outlasted the actual Portuguese presence) and thus were likely created during Esigie's early-16th century rule (possibly c. 1520), either during Idia's life or soon after her death. The similarities between the masks indicate that they were likely created at the same time by the same artist. Their details match the comparable carving qualities of ivory spoons and salt cellars commissioned during the same period, the early period of Benin art, the phase of strongest affiliation with Ife or Yoruba art. Ivory works from Benin were mainly for the Oba to use in ritual. The masks may have been used in ceremonies including the Ugie Iyoba commemoration of the Oba's mother, as well the Emobo purification ceremony to expel bad spirits from the land. Similar pendant masks are mainly used in contemporary Emobo ceremonies focused on bad spirits, though the traditions of Emobo may have changed throughout history.

Four rungs on the side of the masks, above and below each ear, let the masks hang in suspension and indicate that the masks were suspended from a cord, though experts have disagreed on how they were worn. British Museum art historian William Fagg concluded that unlike the small brass pendant masks worn at the waist by modern kings, the ivory mask was likely worn around the neck. An 1830s drawing of a similar mask worn at the breast by a neighboring ruler confirms Fagg's theory. Based on the position of the rungs, Metropolitan curator Alisa LaGamma also affirmed the theory. Benin specialist and anthropologist Paula Ben-Amos, however, wrote that the masks were worn on the waist as pendants during the Ugie Iyoba and Emobo ceremonies. The hollow masks likely served as amuletic containers. Below the mask's collars, the ring of small loops are attachment points for crotal bells.

== Description and interpretation ==
They are made of ivory, long and ovular in shape, and thinly carved, approaching semiopaqueness. The similar British Museum and Metropolitan pendant masks have elaborate ornament at their hair and collar. Each mask's gaze is accentuated with iron inlay at its pupils and lower eye outline, and the eyes are slightly diverted by the eyelids. (Note: The Met's mask uses iron inlay in the pupils and forehead markings, and copper inlay for the eyelid outline.) This use of inlay departed from the ways in which Europeans used ivory. Above the eyes, the four supraorbital marks are associated with Benin women. The masks' facial features are symmetrical and skillfully precise. Their lips are parted, nostrils slightly flared, and hair dense with tiny coils and a rectilinear hairline. The masks' expression of "impersonal coolness" reflected the stylistic conventions of the Oba's ivory carvers guild, with a naturalism typical of craft in early Benin art.

=== A powerful woman ===
The depiction of women is rare in Benin art, though the position of Idia, known to Edo tradition as "the only woman who went to war", is exceptional, and the very title of Iyoba or Queen Mother was created for her. The headdress forms part of the ukpe-okhue ("parrot's beak") hairstyle she originated, and is more clearly seen on the Bronze Head of Queen Idia. The depicted precious coral of the headdress and choker are in the form of cylindrical ileke ("royal") beads, which it was the specially-granted privilege of the Queen Mother to wear, being usually reserved for the Oba and the Edogun (war chief). The Linden Museum mask also has a string of actual ikiele beads of coral wrapped around its forehead. These red beads and red cloth, once reserved for leadership figures, have in modern times been popularly adopted as elements of Edo traditional dress.

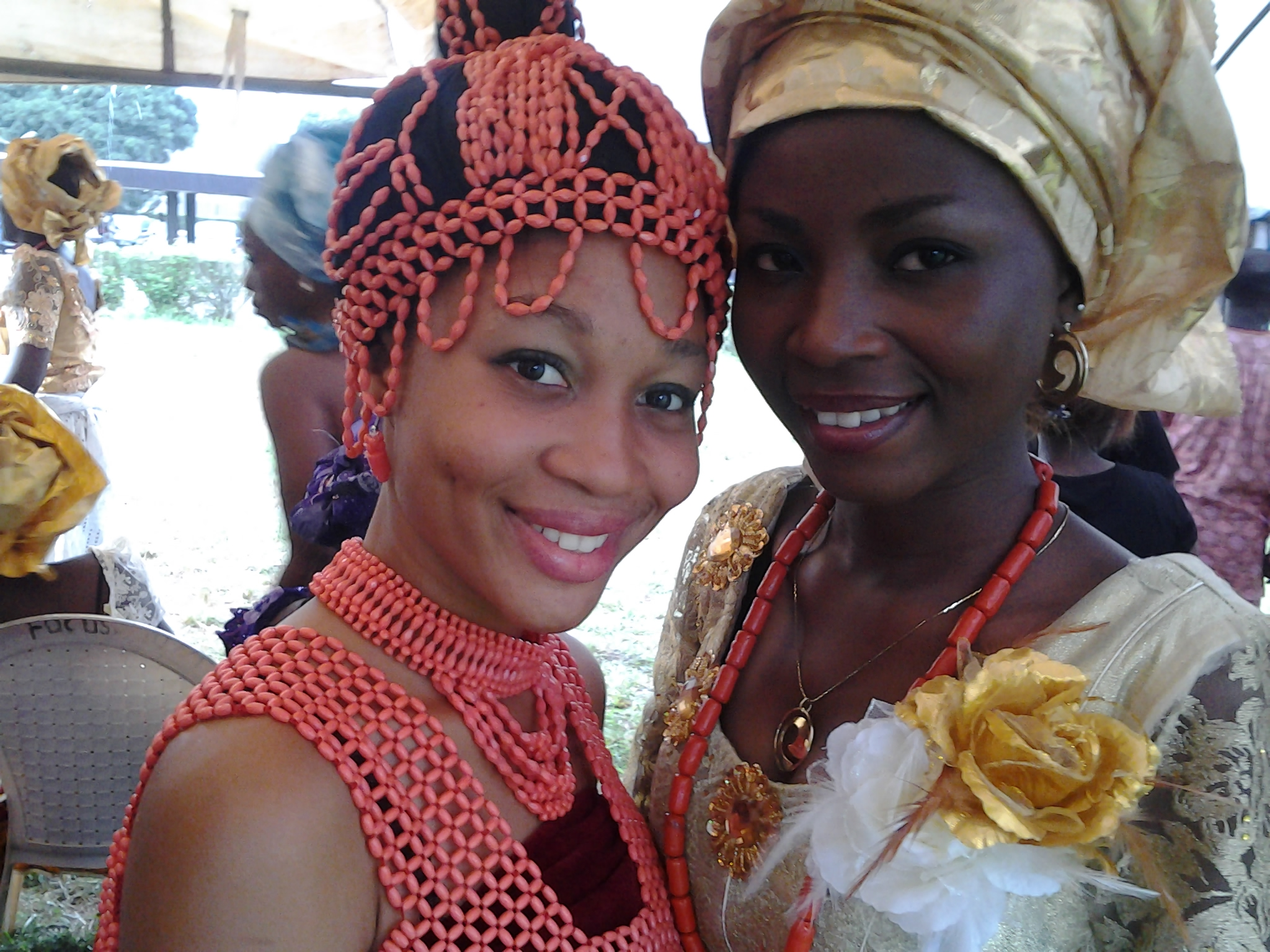
Modern Edo women wearing ileke-style beads.

The foreheads of both masks were are inscribed with four vertical cicatrices over each eye, with inlays of a pair of iron strips highlighting the scarification. Iron is also used in the pupils and rims of the eyes.

=== Trade symbol ===
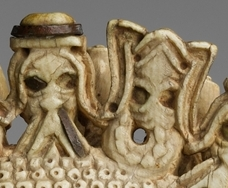
Detail of Portuguese merchant head and mudfish

Ivory, both then and now, connotes royal wealth, power, and purity. Ivory, already a luxury commodity in Africa, became increasingly coveted with the growth of the European ivory trade. When an elephant was killed in Benin, the Oba received one tusk as a gift and was offered the other in sale. Thus, the Oba had many tusks and controlled the ivory trade. Ivory is associated with the Edo orisha of the sea, Olokun. As this orisha gives wealth and fertility, it the spirit world's equivalent of the Benin Oba. Ivory gave wealth similar to Olokun, as it enticed the Portuguese merchants who, in turn, returned wealth to Benin. The Portuguese belonged to Olokun, having arrived from the sea. The whiteness of ivory also reflects the symbolism of white chalk, whose ritual purity is associated with Olokun.

The openwork of the tiara and collar represent tiny heads of Portuguese men in the tiara of both the Met and the British Museum examples, with eleven figures in the British Museum mask, and in the Met mask seven figures of Portuguese men alternating with six representations of mudfish, the West African lungfish. The Portuguese, who had only recently arrived in the area, were a symbol of power and affluence to the royal court. Their iconography is identifiable by their long hair, hanging mustaches (often described as bearded), and domed hats. Benin art historian Barbara Blackmun interprets these crown adornments as a reference to Idia's ability to conduct the Portuguese power to her son's favor. Mudfish were a common theme in Benin royal arts, and reflected the divinity of the Oba. Edo cosmology believed that spirits crossed the ocean to reach the afterlife, where their leaders lived like gods. As creatures who could live on land and sea, the mudfish symbolized the duality needed for the leader's final journey, and this duality represents the seafaring Portuguese as well. The mudfish also appear in a pattern on the Linden Museum mask's crown, while the private collection mask's crown has bird elements, also formerly present on the similar Seattle Art Museum mask. The masks also differ in pattern along their bottom, collar edges. The collar of the Met example is similarly decorated with eleven Portuguese men (with damage on its proper right side), while the collar of the British Museum mask is instead an abstract guilloché latticework.

== Provenance ==
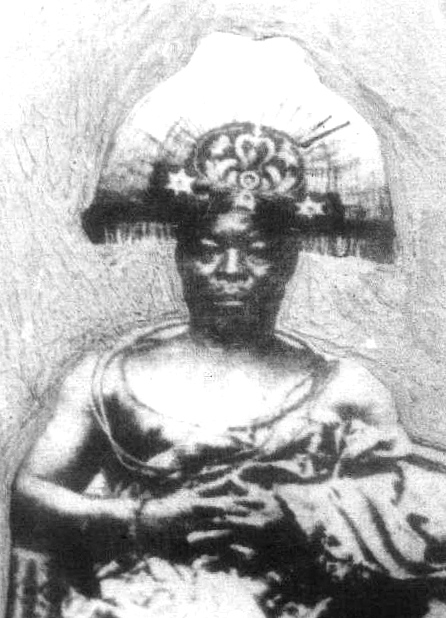
Harry Rawson (left) led the Benin Expedition of 1897 to capture Ovonramwen, the Oba of Benin. The ivory pendant masks were looted from the Oba's bedroom.

During the 1897 punitive Benin Expedition, the British looted a group of similar ivory masks in the Oba's palace bedroom. The expedition's civil leader Ralph Moor took the two finest masks, which were later collected by British anthropologist Charles Gabriel Seligman and transferred to the London Museum of Mankind (now the British Museum) and the New York Museum of Primitive Art (now the Metropolitan Museum of Art). Two additional masks from the bedchamber group were taken by the British and now reside in the collections of the Seattle Art Museum (formerly Principal Medical Officer Robert Allman) and the Linden Museum in Stuttgart (formerly W. D. Webster and then Augustus Pitt Rivers), and there is one in a private collection of the heirs of Henry Galway.

Five to six masks of this type were found in a large chest in 1897 in the bedchamber of the then-reigning Oba Ovonramwen, the ruler at the Benin court. They were taken at a time of great civil unrest during the British punitive Benin Expedition of 1897, the British burned the royal palaces of the Oba and the Queen Mother and looted thousands of ivory, brass and wood artworks from the ancestral altars, private quarters and storerooms and many were sold in England to western museums and collectors to offset the cost of the expedition. The British Museum's pendant was purchased in 1910 from the British anthropologist Prof Charles Gabriel Seligman.

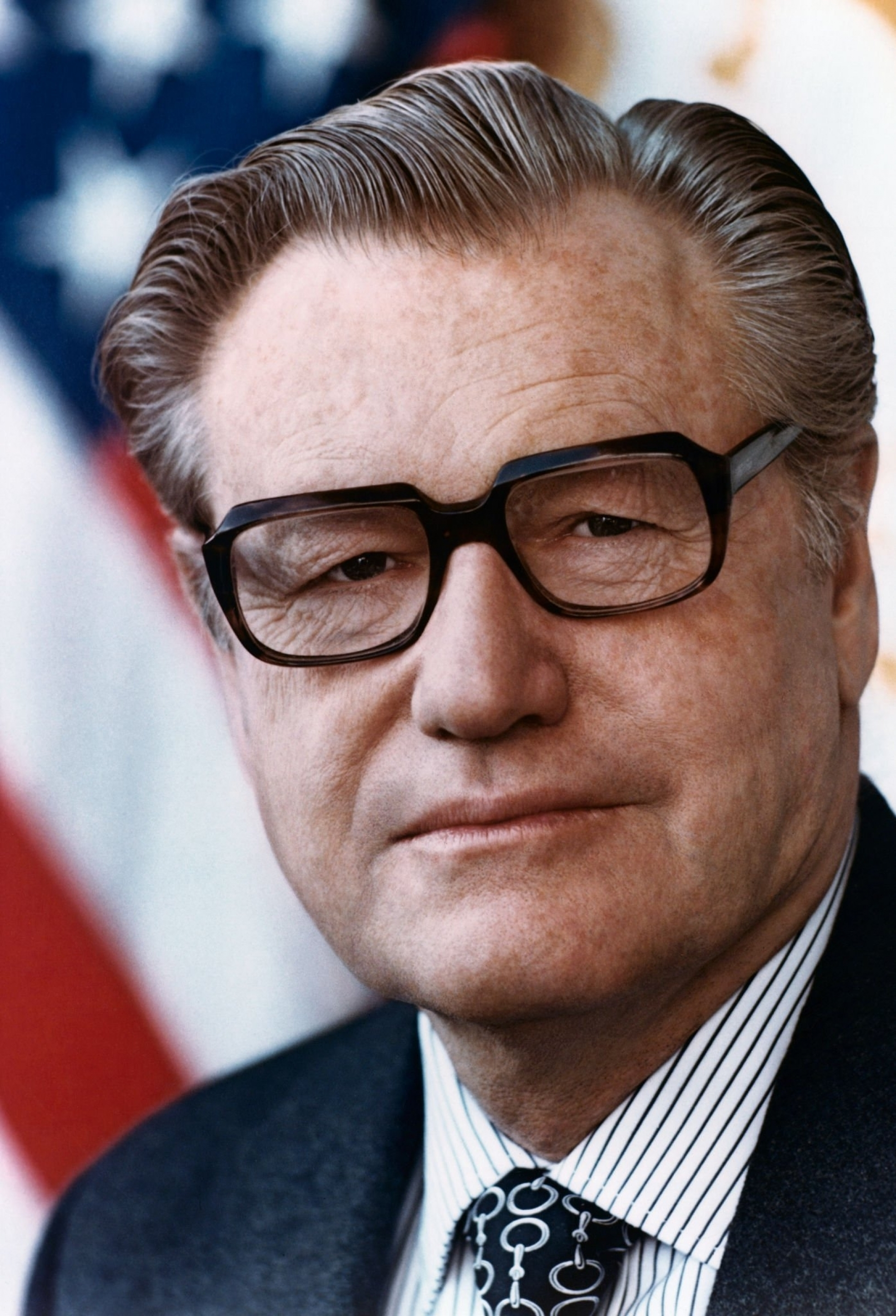
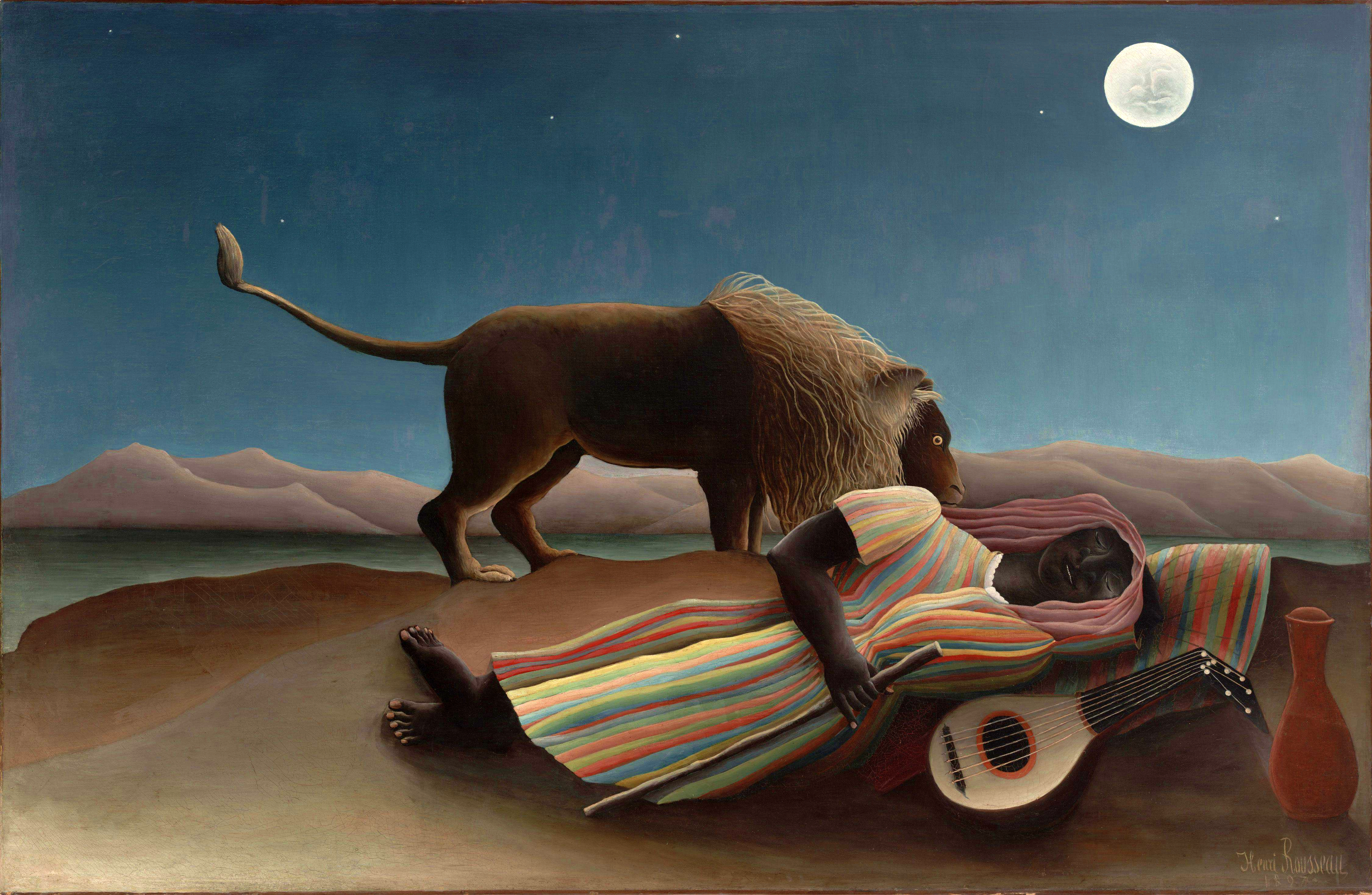
Rockefeller founded the Museum for Primitive Art. Its director claimed that the mask would become as recognizable as Rousseau's Sleeping Gypsy.

The Met's mask was acquired in 1972 as a gift of Nelson Rockefeller. He founded the Museum of Primitive Art in 1954 after the Metropolitan Museum did not reciprocate his interest in Precolumbian art. The museum collected works for their artistic—and not anthropological—value, contrasting with the earlier history of African art in Western collections. The Queens College art historian Robert Goldwater became its director and recommended acquisitions. His argument to collect the ivory pendant mask was among his longest, at the end of 1957. He called it "the best object of its kind known, nor will any others ever turn up". Goldwater wrote that the mask was higher in quality than the similar, renowned one owned by the British Museum. The mask, he predicted, would redefine the collection and go on permanent display, on par with the Museum of Modern Art's well-known Sleeping Gypsy (1897) by Henri Rousseau. Rockefeller purchased the mask at a record price and unveiled it in September 1958. The purchase solidified a policy that Goldwater believed the museum should center around permanent collections of masterworks.

== Legacy ==
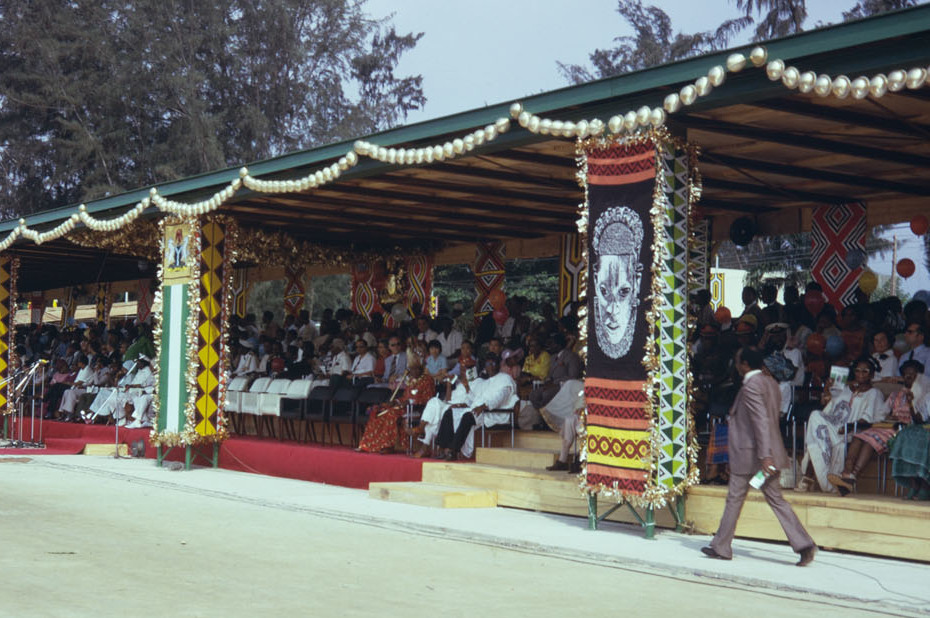
Festac 77, a major cultural festival in Nigeria, united African nations under the Idia mask emblem (pictured on the right).

The Benin Pendant Mask has become an iconic image of Benin art, and the British Museum version in particular was featured on Nigerian one Naira banknotes in 1973, and was chosen as the official emblem of the pan-Africanist FESTAC 77 cultural festival in 1977, so that this design is often known in modern Nigeria as the FESTAC Mask. The Nigerian government was unsuccessful in securing a loan of the work from the British Museum, and commissioned Edo artist Erhabor Emokpae to recreate the mask as a 20-foot tall bronze centerpiece for the festival (on display at the National Arts Theatre since 1979). He also designed a FESTAC flag with the mask as central charge on an unequally banded black-gold-black vertical tricolor, and being responsible for the event's extensive graphic design. Another Edo artist, Felix Idubor, was commissioned to carve two replica masks in ivory for the Nigerian National Museum. A 150 kg bronze reproduction was also donated to UNESCO in 2005.

The Met's Queen Mother pendant mask is considered among the museum's most celebrated works. African art historian Ezio Bassani wrote that the profile of the Met's mask was "at once delicate and strong" with a "musical rhythm", and that its use of iron and copper inlay was both "discreet and functional". He wrote that the Metropolitan and British Museum masks were among the most beautiful ivories carved in Benin, and that their artist was both refined and sensitive. Kate Ezra wrote that the mask's thinness showcased the "sensitivity and solemnity" of early Benin art.

== See also ==
- Bronze Head from Ife
- Bronze Head of Queen Idia
- Okukor, a bronze at Jesus College, Cambridge
- Benin Altar Tusk
