= Idia =

Mother of Esigie

Queen Idia
- Born: c. late 15th century Benin Kingdom
- Died: c. mid‑16th century
- Other name: Iyoba Idia
- Citizenship: Edo (Benin)
- Occupations: Queen Mother, Warrior, Political strategist
- Known for: First Iyoba of Benin; mother of Oba Esigie; role in Idah War (1515–1516)
- Notable work: Represented in Benin bronzes and ivory masks; symbol of FESTAC ’77
- Spouse: Oba Ozolua
- Children: Oba Esigie

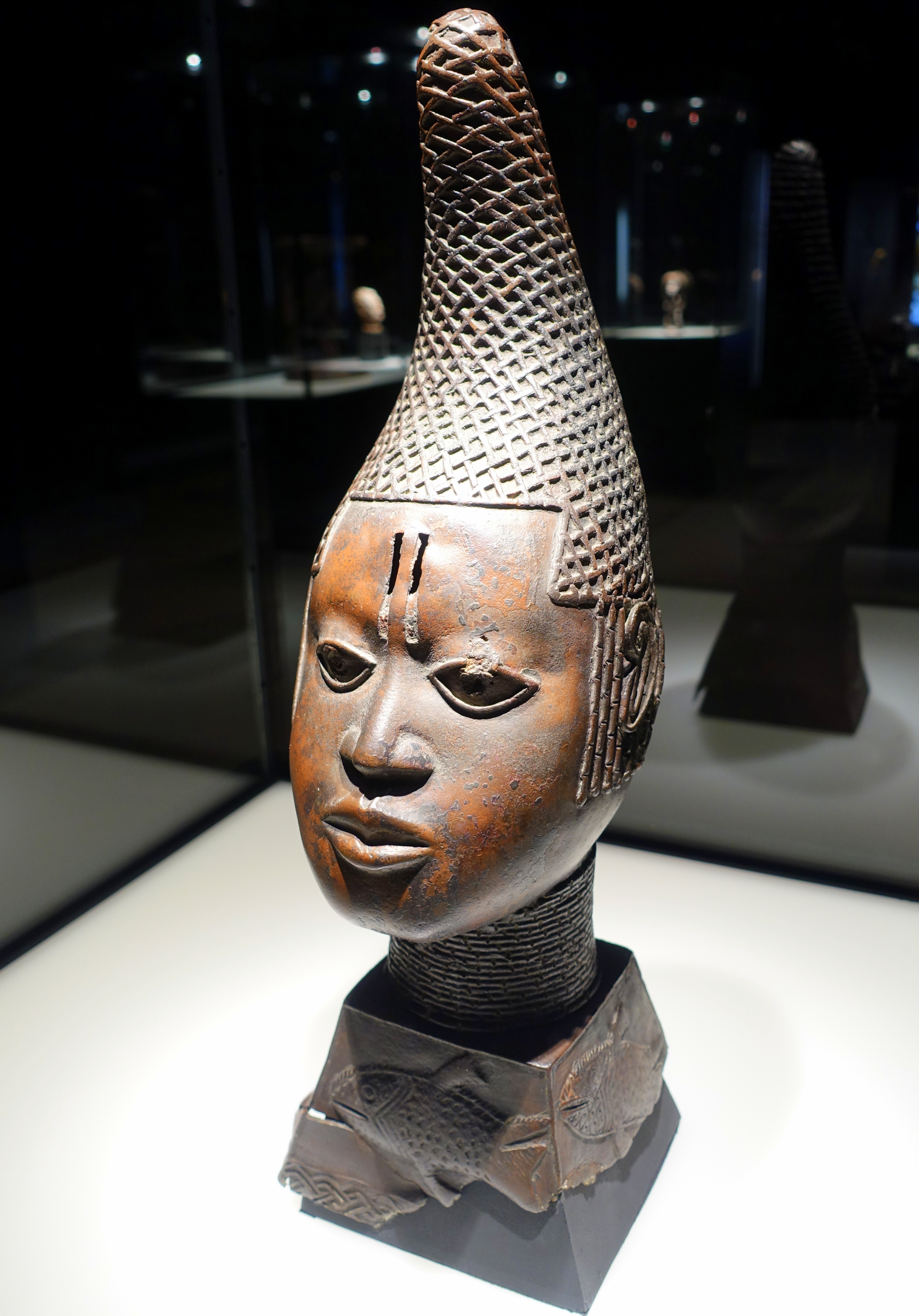
Bronze Head of Queen Idia, one of four from the 16th century (Ethnological Museum of Berlin)

Idia was the mother of Esigie, who reigned as Oba (king) of the Edo people from 1504 to 1550.

== Life ==
Historians are uncertain as regards her period of life; they do know that Idia was alive during the Idah war (1515 – 1516) because she played a role that led to a great Benin victory.

It has been argued that Idia, therefore, was the true power behind the throne of her son. She played a significant role in the rise and reign of the king, being described as a great warrior who fought relentlessly before and during her son's reign as the Oba (king) of the Edo people.

Queen Idia was instrumental in securing the title of Oba for her son Esigie following the death of his father Oba Ozolua. To that end, she raised an army to fight off his brother Arhuaran, who was supposed to be the Oba by right and tradition but who was subsequently defeated in battle. Esigie’s mother became the 1st Iyoba of Benin.

Idia first entered the royal household because Ozolua, the Oba from 1483 until 1514, saw her dance, and after the dance wanted to make her his wife. Idia and the Oba were married sometime before 1504, but historians are not positive about the exact date. As a result, Idia’s parents helped prepare her for her future life in the palace by giving her certain medical herbs. She was known to be very intelligent because she was able to retrieve the throne for her son, and was also able to protect Esigie from his enemies such as Arhuahan (Esigie's half-brother).

Another interesting concept Idia was known for was her “womb of orhue” — a phrase that meant that her womb defied the odds. These odds were that her son, Esigie, was not first in line for the throne, rather Esigie was originally third in line for the throne. In the end, and against the odds, Esigie became the Oba. Ogidogbo, the first in line for the throne as Oba, became illegitimate a candidate for the throne because he was crippled due to playing with his brothers, Aruahan and Esigie. The people of Benin thought that Idia had planned this as they believed Idia to possess magical powers. This also shows how the people of Benin thought that she was able to both evade and create havoc. This resulted in Aruahan being next in line for the throne, but he saw Esigie as a threat. Consequently, Esigie wanted to assassinate his half-brother. Although, the only reason Aruanran did not assassinate his brother was because he believed that Esigie’s mother, Idia, had the skill of magical arts, while Aruahan did not.

There have been many representations of Queen Idia because she represented a key part of Benin's imperial courtly culture. Also, Idia was so influential because of her determination. Overall, she was described as a strong-willed, beautiful, intelligent, and wise woman.

Esigie instituted the title of Iyoba (mother of the monarch) and conferred it on his mother, along with the Eguae-Iyoba (Palace of the Queen Mother).

Queen Idia became more popular in contemporary Nigeria when it was decided that her face should be used as a sculpture to represent a Nigerian Festival, FESTAC ‘77. The face of the Queen Mother came into the art world more after this.

She was supposed to be killed after the crowning of her son as the Oba, according to the then tradition, but her son Esigie secretly took her to hide in a room that was to be entered by only those authorized to do so; he did this in order to protect her from being killed and it worked until he was able to alter the tradition. After he canceled the law concerning royal matricide, Queen Idia returned freely to the palace and ruled together with her son, helping him fight spiritually and physically over his enemies, which helped him during his reign as Oba. Before she died, she trained her son's wife in her ways so her departure would be met unnoticed.

== Victory over Igala people ==
Subsequently, the neighboring Igala people sent warriors across the River Niger to wrest control of Benin's northern territories. Esigie conquered the Igala, reestablishing the unity and military strength of the kingdom. His mother Idia received much of the credit for these victories as her political counsel, together with her magical powers and medicinal knowledge, were viewed as critical elements of Esigie's success on the battlefield.

== Representations of Queen Idia ==
The representations of Queen Idia comprise a group of commemorative heads from medieval Benin that represents Queen Idia, mother of Oba Esigie (r. 1504-1550), made during the early sixteenth century at the Benin court. The representations of Queen Idia discussed here include the Bronze Head of Queen Idia (British Museum in London), a pendant ivory mask of Queen Idia (Metropolitan Museum of Art in New York), and finally an ivory mask of Queen Idia (British Museum in London).

Several artistic representations of Idia were looted from Benin City during the British Benin Expedition of 1897 and are now held in museums around the world. Alongside other Benin Bronzes, they have been the subject of calls for their repatriation.

A Queen Idia ivory mask held in the British Museum became the symbol of the Second World Black and African Festival of Art and Culture FESTAC held in Nigeria in 1977.

In Eddie Ugbomah's 1979 film The Mask, the Nigerian hero steals a Queen Idia mask back from the British Museum.

The imagined childhood of Queen Idia is the focus of an award-winning children's book titled Idia of the Benin Kingdom written by Ekiuwa Aire.

A game based on Queen Idia was one of the winners of the Echoes game jam, a competition held by Goethe-Institute Nigeria.

=== Brass heads ===
Brass Head of Queen Idia
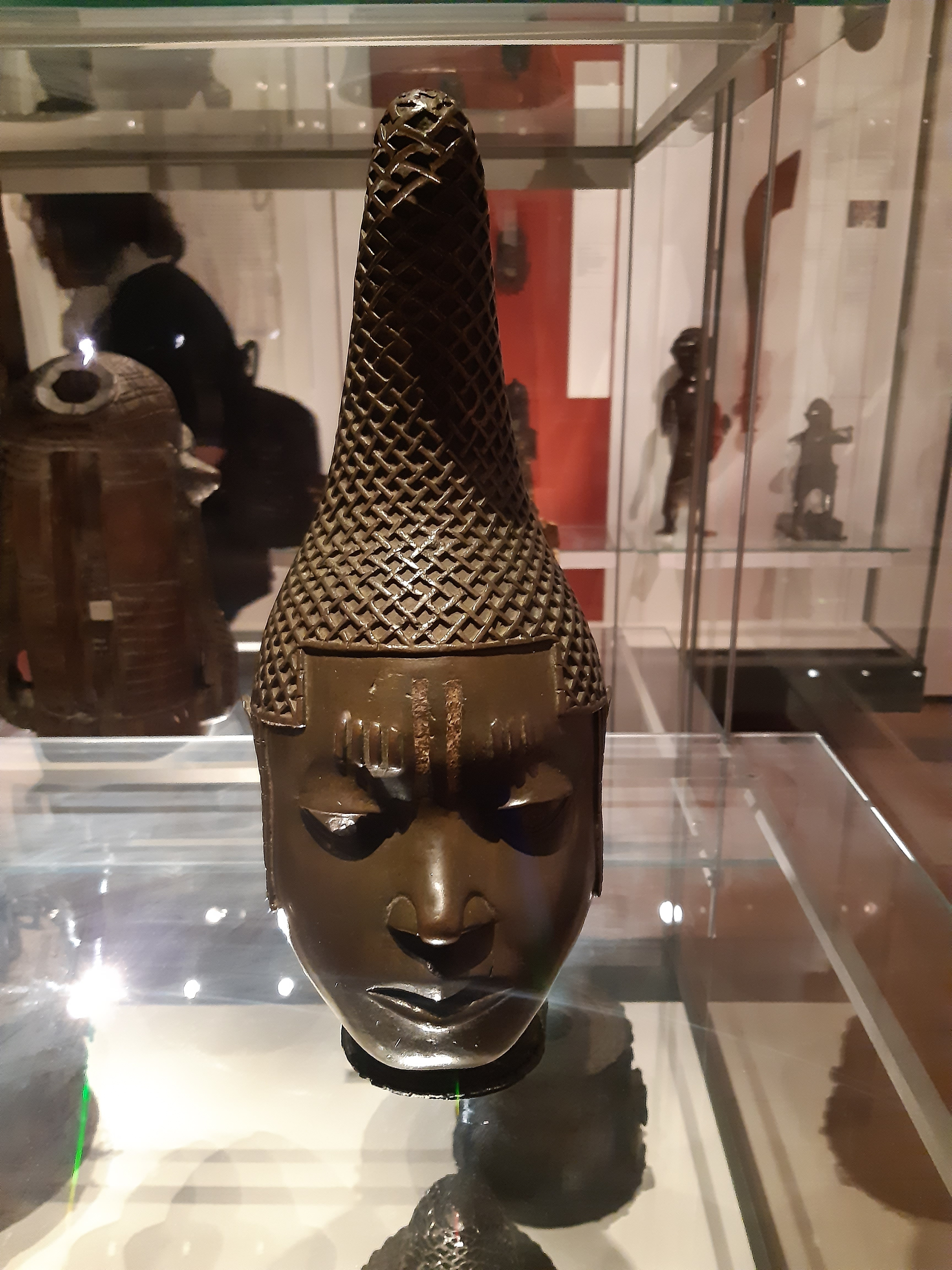
- Brass memorial head of Queen Idia at the British Museum.
- Material: Brass
- Size: height:41cm width:15.5cm depth:17.5cm
- Weight: 3.9kg
- Registration: Af1897,1011.1

The Brass Heads of Queen Idia are a group of four commemorative brass heads from medieval Benin that represents Idia, mother of Oba Esigie, made during the early sixteenth century at the Benin court. The four cast brass heads of the queen are known and are currently in the collections of the British Museum in London, the World Museum in Liverpool (accession number 27.11.99.8.), the Nigerian National Museum in Lagos, and the Ethnological Museum of Berlin. Although these are commonly called "Bronze Heads" because the composition of metalwork from Benin were initially thought to be bronze, and were only later identified as brass; therefore a more accurate description is the "Brass Heads" of Queen Idia. These brass heads are among the many Benin works of art that entered the European art market after the invasion of the British, an event known as the Benin Expedition of 1897.

The brass heads were made using the lost wax casting technique in the early sixteenth century. The image located at the British Museum is a realistic representation of a young woman from the Benin court, who wears a high pointed ukpe-okhue crown of lattice-shaped red coral beads. The hairstyle is referred to as a "parrot's beak" hairstyle and was only allowed to be worn by the Iyoba and the major war chief. Above and between the eyes are two bands that were inset with iron. These reflect the oral tale of how Idia came to be the Iyoba; the tale states that an oracle had told Idia to place medicine on two incisions above her eyes in order to prevent the Oba Ozolua from picking her for his wife. Oba Ozolua then went on to defeat the oracle's premonitions and Idia became the mother of Oba Esigie. When Oba Esigie commissioned these brass heads to be made and placed in Idia's memorial palace, he ensured that they had these incisions in order to honor how Idia came to be the first Iyoba of Benin. Above each eyebrow are engraved four cicatrices. The sophisticated technique and design of the four heads suggest that they were made in the early sixteenth century, commissioned by Idia's son Oba Esigie, and created by the imperial guild of brass-casters that was founded by the previous Oba, Oba Ogolua. Queen Idia played an instrumental role in her son's successful military campaigns against neighboring tribes and factions. After her death, Oba Esigie ordered dedicatory heads of the queen to be made, to be placed in front of altars or in the Queen Mother's palace. The heads were designed to honor her military achievements and ceremonial power.

The British Museum head was presented to the museum by Sir William Ingram in 1897.

=== Ivory masks ===
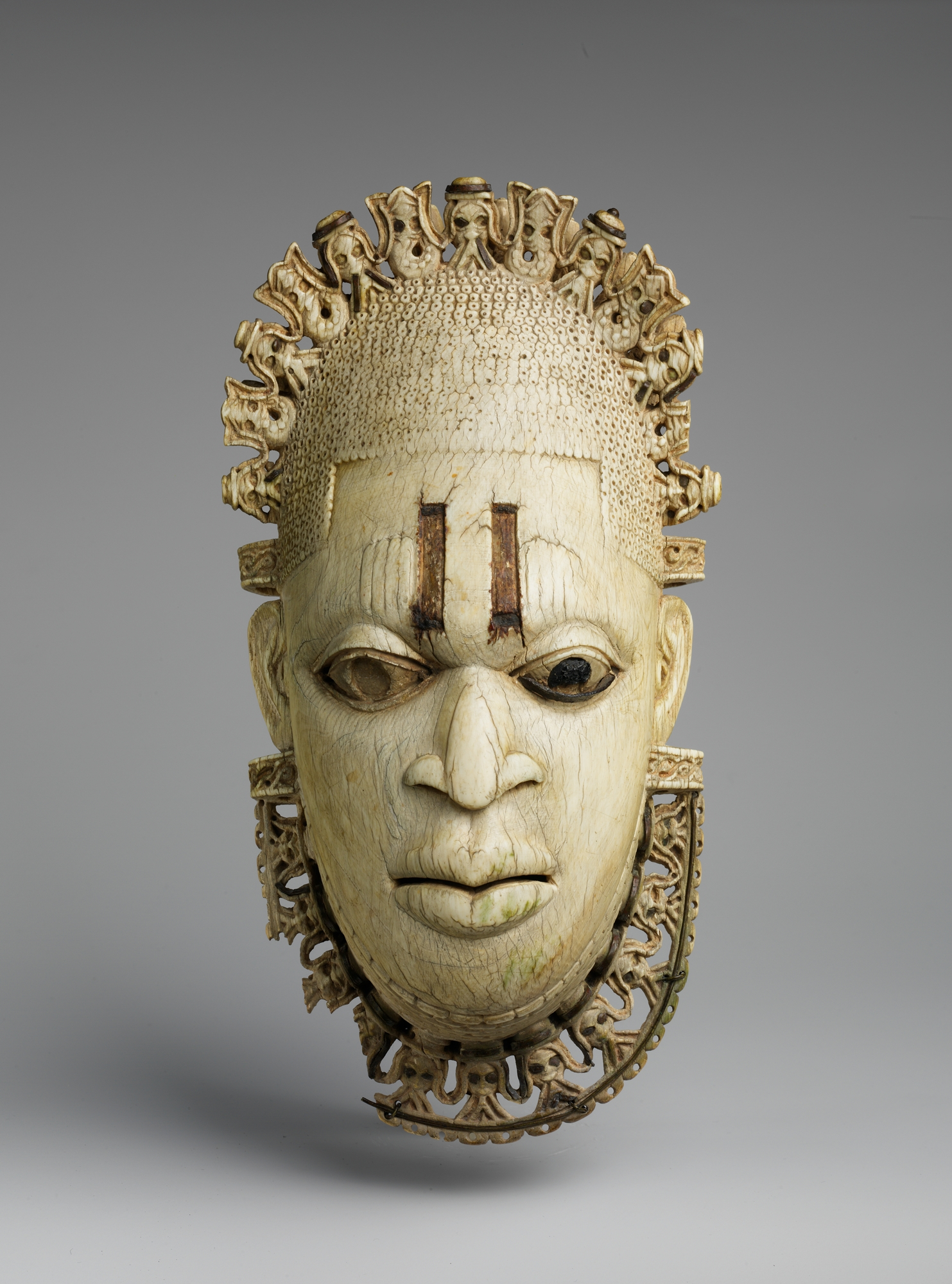
The Pendant Ivory Mask is currently in The Metropolitan Museum of Art

Idia's face is one of the most well-known faces of African royal women. There are two extant masks of Queen Idia that are made from ivory. One is located in the British Museum while the pendant ivory mask is located in the Metropolitan Museum of Art. These two ivory masks are almost identical to the each other, and both of these masks were made around the 16th century. The Benin ivory mask is about nine inches tall and five inches wide. Ivory masks were usually carved freehanded with a chisel and a file without a design to follow. Obas paid homage to the queen mothers by wearing carved ivory pendant masks of the Iyoba to ward off bad spirits. The function of these ivory masks was to commemorate Iyoba Idia, and the piece was to appear at an altar dedicated to her. Also, Oba Esigie wore these masks during ceremonies. They were commissioned by Oba Esigie, her son. Historians are able to identify that it is indeed Queen Idia depicted in these masks because of the two parallel lines down her forehead between her eyebrows, represented here with two pieces of inlaid iron. Some have thought that the two parallel lines down Idia's face were thought to be where she held her magical powers; however, there is an alternate explanation for this. The two parallel lines down Queen Idia's face were caused by her parents because they did not want her to become Oba Ozolua's wife. They were advised in an oracle that they needed to scar her face to make her less beautiful so that Ozolua would not marry her. Also, her parents had medicinal potions placed within her scars by the divine physician in Benin. These medicinal potions were to assure that Oba Ozolua would stay away. This in the end did not work to repel Oba Ozolua: he sensed that something was wrong with Idia, but was quick enough to realize that she had been scarred and poisoned, so he was able to neutralize the medicine.

The crown on both of the ivory masks of Idia displays Portuguese soldiers. To the Benin culture, the Portuguese arrival from the seas with great amounts of wealth made them people of the spirit realm who came to bring wealth and power to the oba. This depiction shows the importance of the presence of the European soldiers. The white of the ivory represents purity and is associated with the god of the sea, Olokun. Olokun's wealth and fertility is the counterpart to the oba. Ivory became Benin's main commerce commodity following the arrival of Portuguese traders who bought ivory in Benin. Also, along the crown of the mask there are the air-breathing mudfish, Clarias anguillaris, which lived on both land and in the sea, representing the duality of the oba's humanity and godhood. Overall, the crown represents both the human and the divine. The Benin ivory mask of Queen Idia illustrates Benin's culture and also represents Queen Idia's formidable character. These masks are also important as an illustration of the physical appearance and presence of Queen Idia. The only significant variation between the two masks is the differently designed collars: The Benin ivory mask has an intricate pattern as a collar, while the pendant ivory mask has the design of Portuguese soldiers. The Benin ivory mask is in better condition in comparison to the pendant ivory mask.

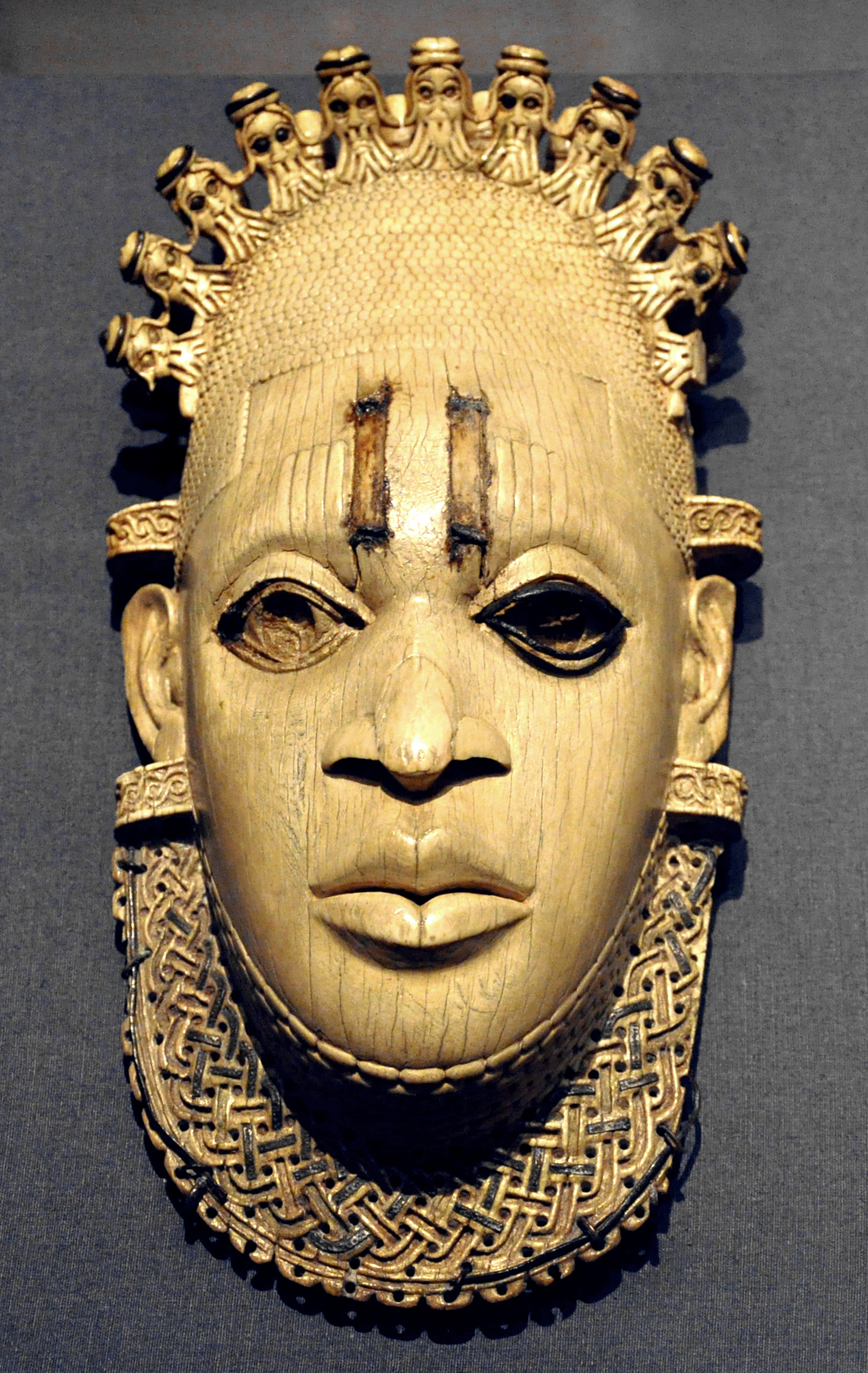
Benin ivory mask representing Idia, the court of Benin, 16th century (British Museum, London)

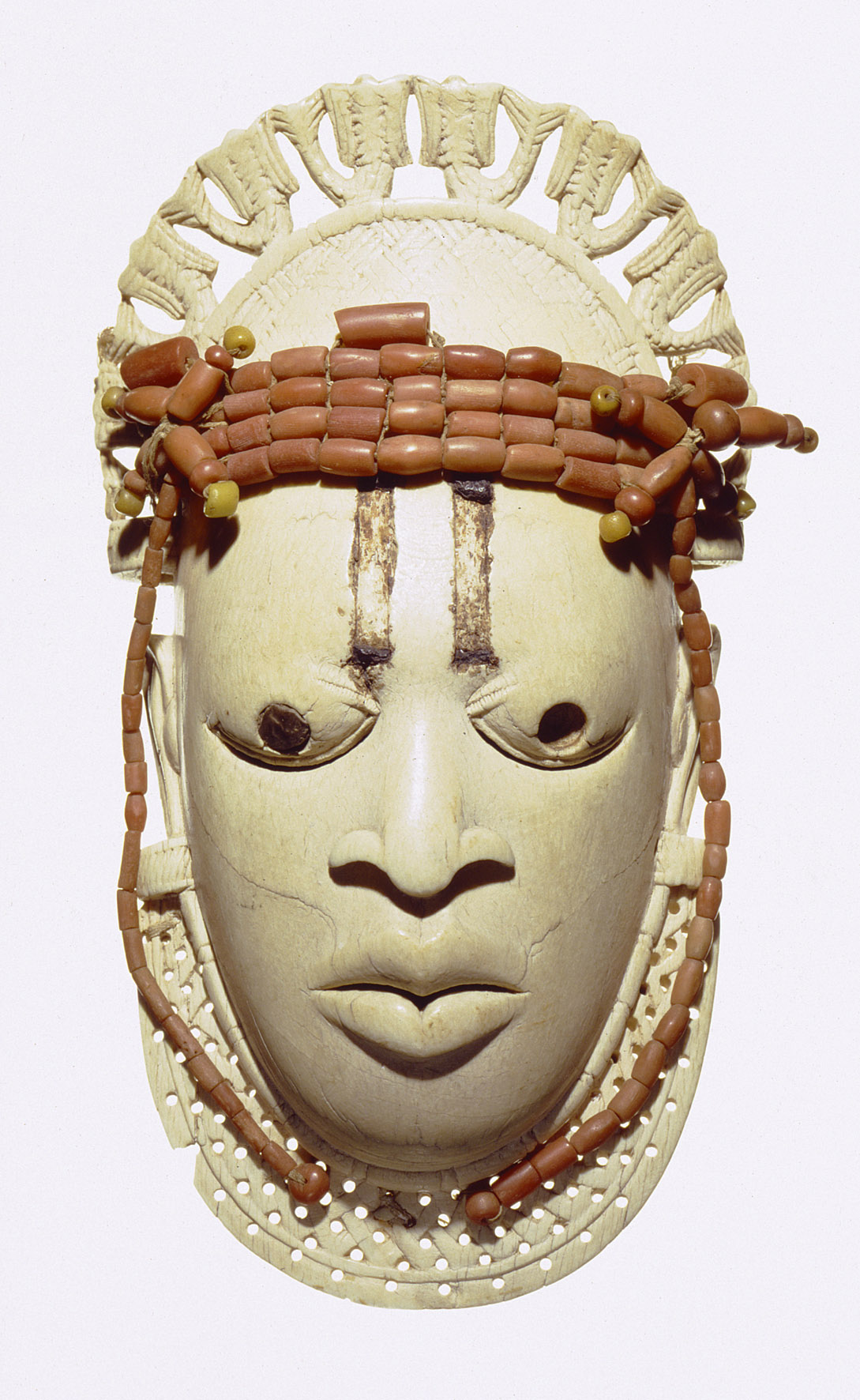
Benin ivory mask, with coral beads, representing Idia, the court of Benin, 16th century (Linden Museum, Stuttgart)

== See also ==
- Benin Bronzes
- Benin ivory mask
- Bronze Head from Ife
