= Iyoba of Benin =

Benin's Queen Mother

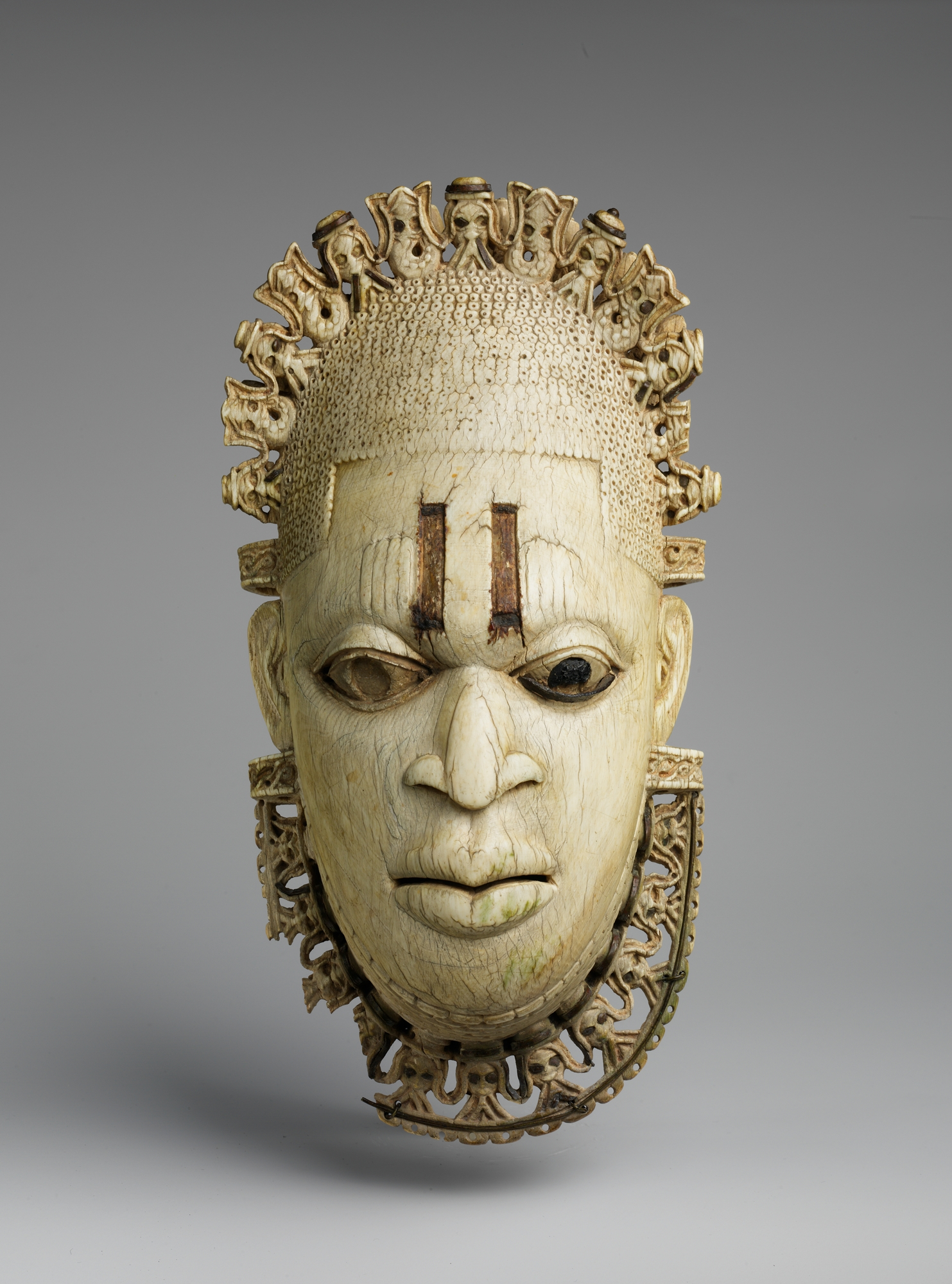
An ivory pendant mask of Idia of Benin

The Iyoba of Benin is an important female titleholder in the chieftaincy system of the Kingdom of Benin, a Nigerian traditional state. She is otherwise known in English as the Queen Mother.

== History ==
When King Ozolua died in the fifteenth century, he left behind two sons to dispute the royal succession: Esigie controlled Benin City, the kingdom's metropolitan center, while his brother Arhuaran was based in Udo - an important provincial seat 32 kilometres (20 miles) away. Neither prince was prepared to yield to the other, partisans soon declared for one or the other, and Benin was plunged into a civil war shortly thereafter.

Seeing an opportunity to take advantage of the situation, the hitherto vassal Igala people declared their independence from Benin and seized a swath of territory to its north. In the span of a week, Esigie found himself confronted with what now seemed like the almost certain fragmentation of his father's kingdom.

His mother, Idia, is reputed to have stood behind him at this time. By serving as everything from his counsellor to his priestess, she rallied the Binis - including many that had previously supported Arhuaran - to Esigie's standard. After dealing decisively with her stepson, the royal pair turned their attention to the Igala rebels. Following a hard-fought campaign, Benin's supremacy was restored, and the victorious army - with Esigie and Idia at its head - returned to the capital in triumph.

In gratitude for his mother's efforts on his behalf, King Esigie created a new office - that of Iyoba - for her to occupy. Now ranking equal to the senior chiefs of the royal court, the Iyoba also built her own palace in the town of Uselu, which was thereafter attached to her title as a perpetual fief. She was the first woman in the history of Benin to have such power.

== Duties ==
A presumptive Iyoba's principal function within the harem during her husband's lifetime was to give birth to and raise the crown prince that would eventually - all things being equal - succeed him as the Oba of Benin. Although this is no longer the case, she was also expected to have no children besides him.

Furthermore, in emulation of Idia's example, she was expected to be a powerful sorceress - and to use her knowledge of the mystic arts to the future king's advantage at all times.

Most of her ladies-in-waiting - a coterie of aristocratic girls that were expected to wait upon her while simultaneously learning about the inner workings of her office - would in turn eventually become members of her son's own harem (and thus potential Iyobas themselves). A comparatively small number would remain in her service for life as her titular wives, this being due to the fact that a person of her rank and position was traditionally expected to have a harem of their own.

Once invested shortly after the coronation of her son, the Iyoba decamped to Uselu, where she spent the remainder of her days. Although forbidden to ever see the Oba again, she was nevertheless expected to serve as his chief advisor, so palace messengers were almost constantly moving from Benin to Uselu, and from Uselu to Benin.

In times of war, the Iyoba was the only woman in the kingdom that was constitutionally empowered to participate. As a chief of high rank, she served as the commander of her own military regiment - the Queen's Own.

Following her death, an Iyoba became the patron goddess of her son the king. As part of her funerary ceremonies, he was expected to commission art that would decorate her personal altar in the shrine of the kings in the palace. The Iyobas were the only class of women that was honoured in the shrine.

== Incumbent ==
There is currently no living Iyoba. Be that as it may, Princess Eghiunwe Akenzua, the late mother of the incumbent Oba Ewuare II, was posthumously invested with the title by her son during his coronation in 2016.

== See also ==
- Erelu Kuti
- Iyalode
- Queen mothers in Africa
