= Linden Museum =

Ethnological museum in Stuttgart, Germany

Coordinates: 48.7825°N 9.17028°E

Linden Museum (Linden-Museum Stuttgart)
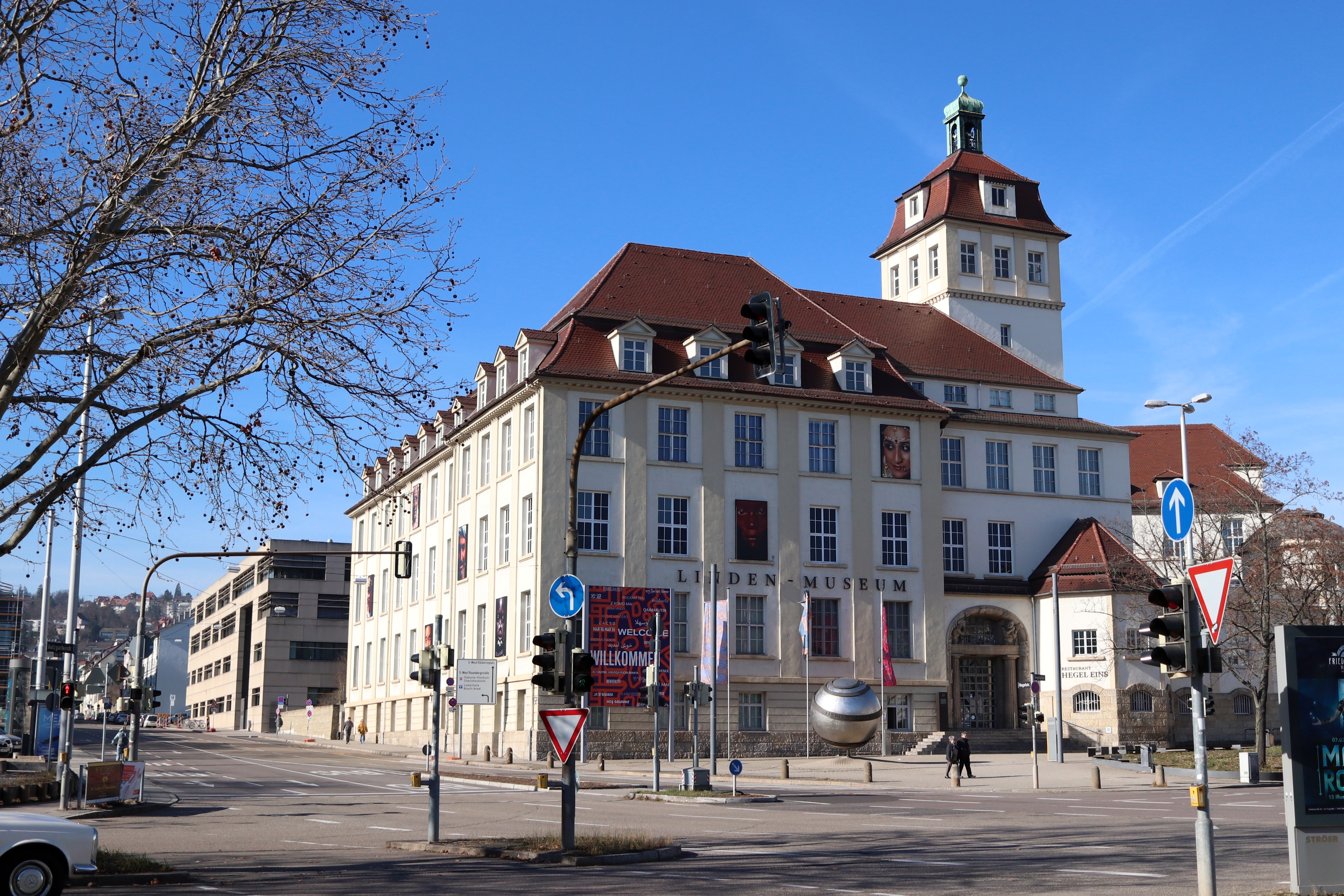
- Established: May 28, 1911; 114 years ago
- Location: Stuttgart, Germany
- Collection size: Ethnological
- Website: www.lindenmuseum.de/en

The Linden Museum (German: Linden-Museum Stuttgart. Staatliches Museum für Völkerkunde) is an ethnological museum located in Stuttgart, Germany. The museum features cultural artifacts from around the world, including South and Southeast Asia, Africa, the Islamic world from the Near East to Pakistan, China and Japan, as well as artifacts from North and Latin America and Oceania.

The museum traces its origins to the collection of objects amassed by the Verein für Handelsgeographie (Association for Trade Geography) in the 19th century. The namesake of the museum is Karl Graf von Linden (1838–1910) who, as president of the Stuttgart Verein für Handelsgeographie, took an interest in assembling and organizing the collection, and invited explorers of the caliber of Sven Hedin and Roald Amundsen to Stuttgart.

In 1911, the collection was established as a private museum and its current building was constructed. After suffering extensive damage during World War II, the building was restored in the 1950s and the municipality became its custodian. Since 1973, the museum has been jointly administered by the city of Stuttgart and the state of Baden-Württemberg.

== Repatriation ==
In July 2022, Germany announced the immediate ownership transfer of 1,100 artefacts held by the museum, alongside the Humboldt Forum in Berlin, the Rautenstrauch-Joest Museum in Cologne, the Museum am Rothenbaum in Hamburg, and the State Ethnographic Collections of Saxony. The physical return of each item was negotiated between the German museums and the Nigerian government, with a "representative collection of objects" slated to remain in Germany on a long-term loan.

In 2023 the museum was one of seven German museums to return Māori and Moriori remains to the Museum of New Zealand Te Papa Tongarewa in New Zealand.

== Educational offerings ==
The Linden Museum offers a diverse range of educational programs tailored to different target groups.

Children can explore the exhibitions in a playful way through experimental research assignments and child-friendly media guides. In addition, guided tours, holiday programs, and workshops are regularly offered to provide children with access to art, culture, and the history of the collection. For children and teenagers aged 8 to 14, there is also a youth club where participants engage with specific exhibitions and collection objects over an extended period. In a creative and exploratory manner, they work on projects such as thematic booklets or small presentations.

In the field of cultural education, the museum also offers workshops and guided tours for school classes, tailored to the students' respective levels of knowledge. Additionally, there are professional development programs available for teachers and educators to enhance their pedagogical skills.

== Gallery ==
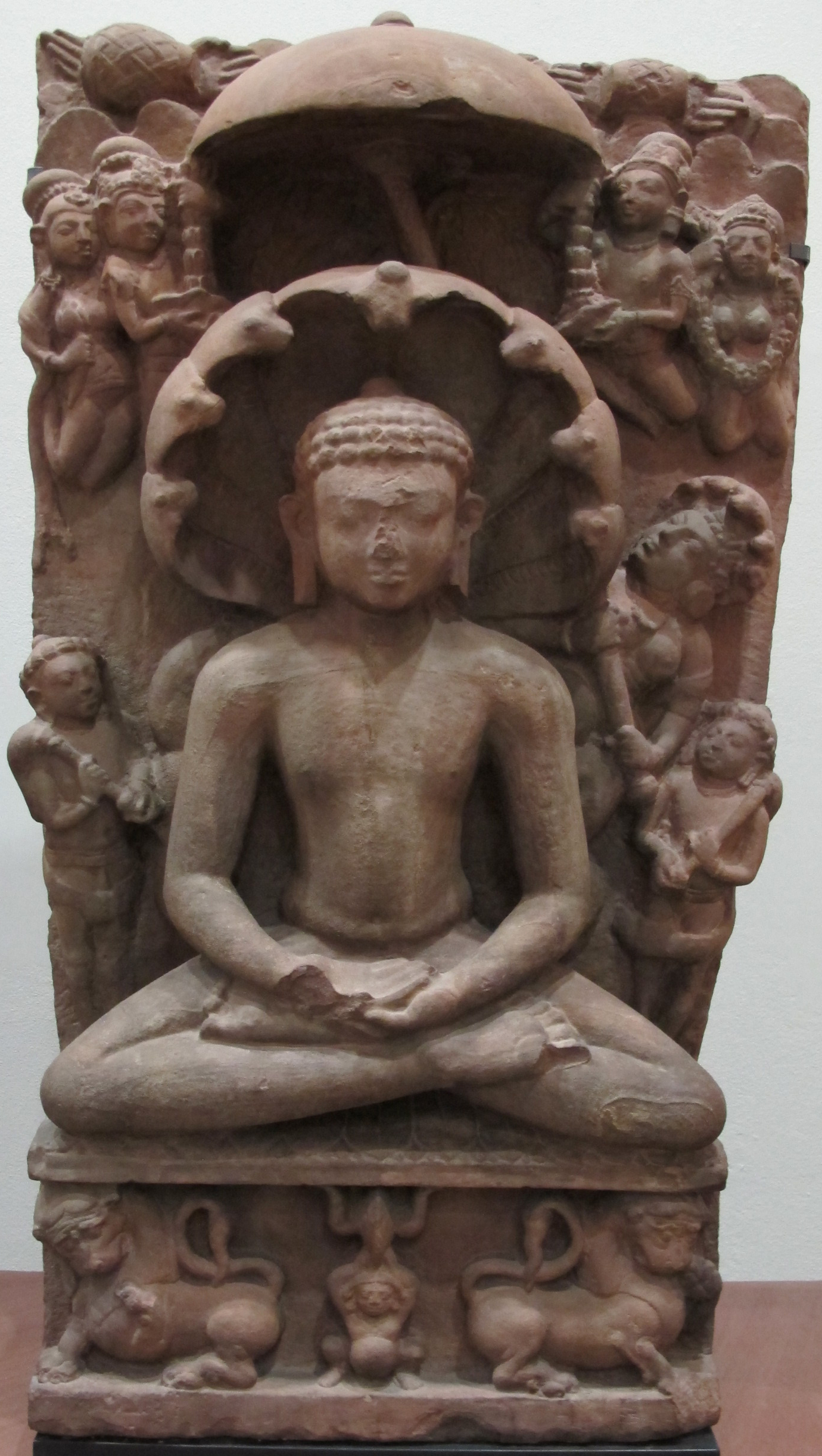
Parshvanatha Sculpture, India, 7th Century

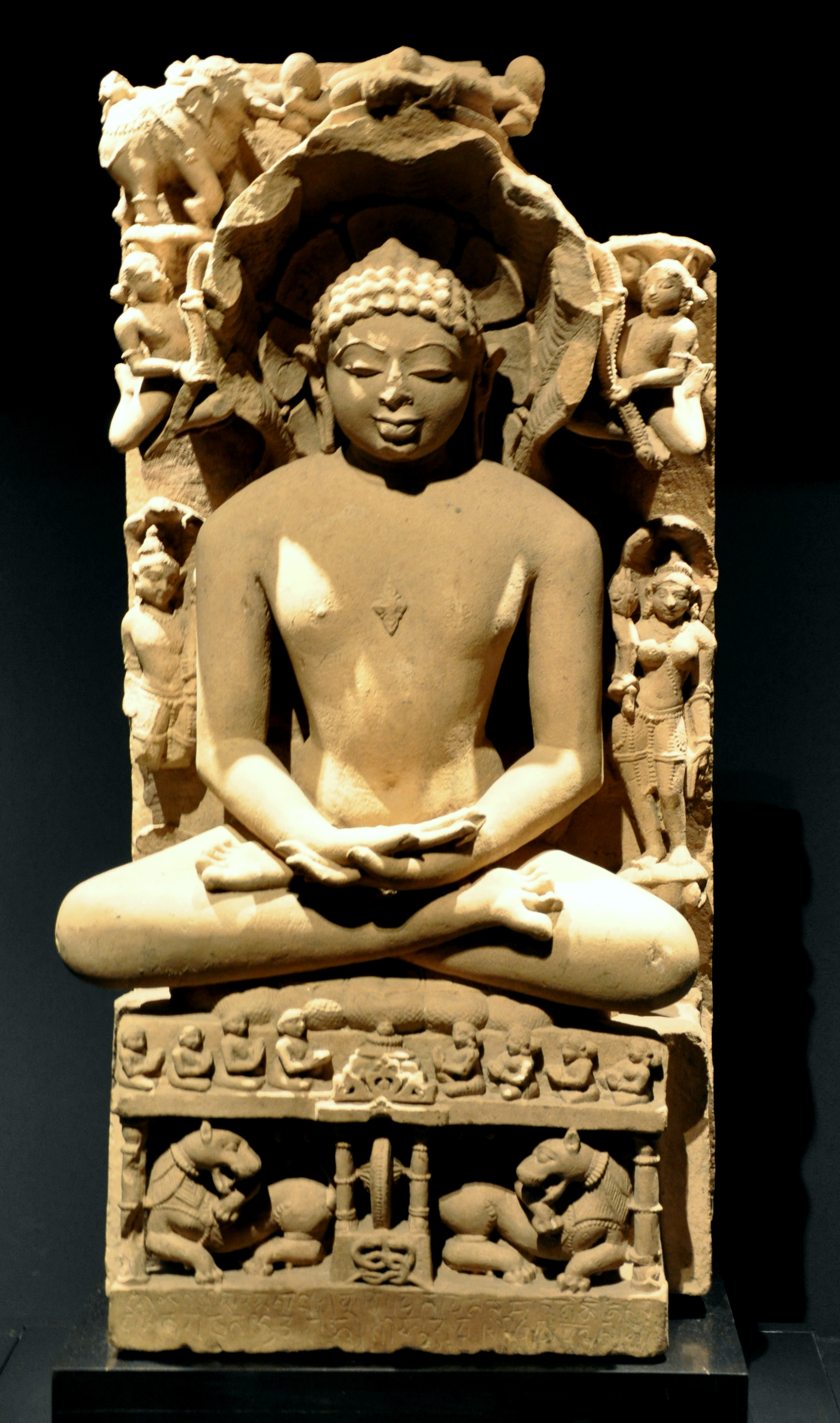
Parshvanatha, Sandstone, India, 10th Century

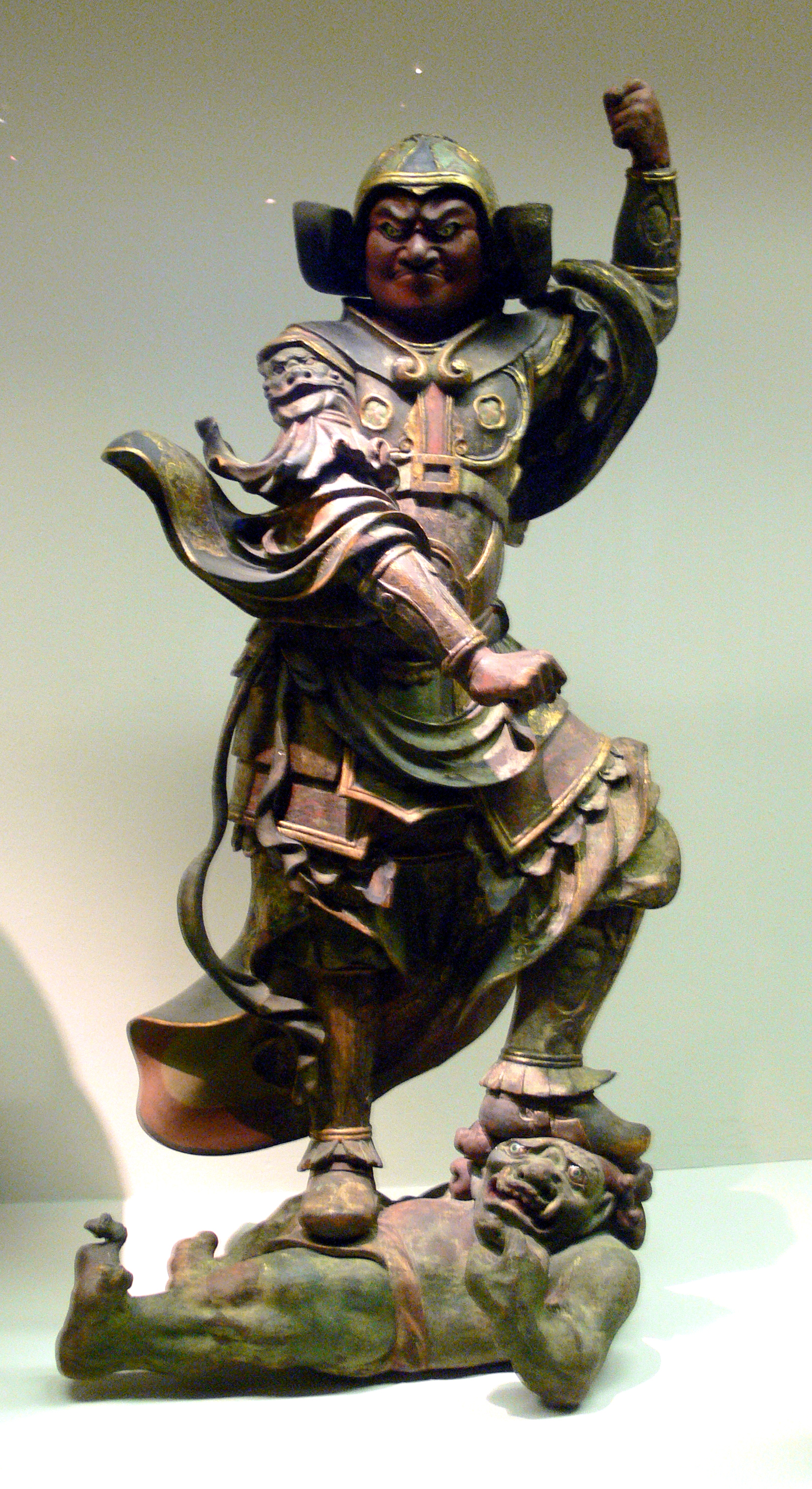
Sky King (Lokapala), Japan, Kamakura period (1185-1333)

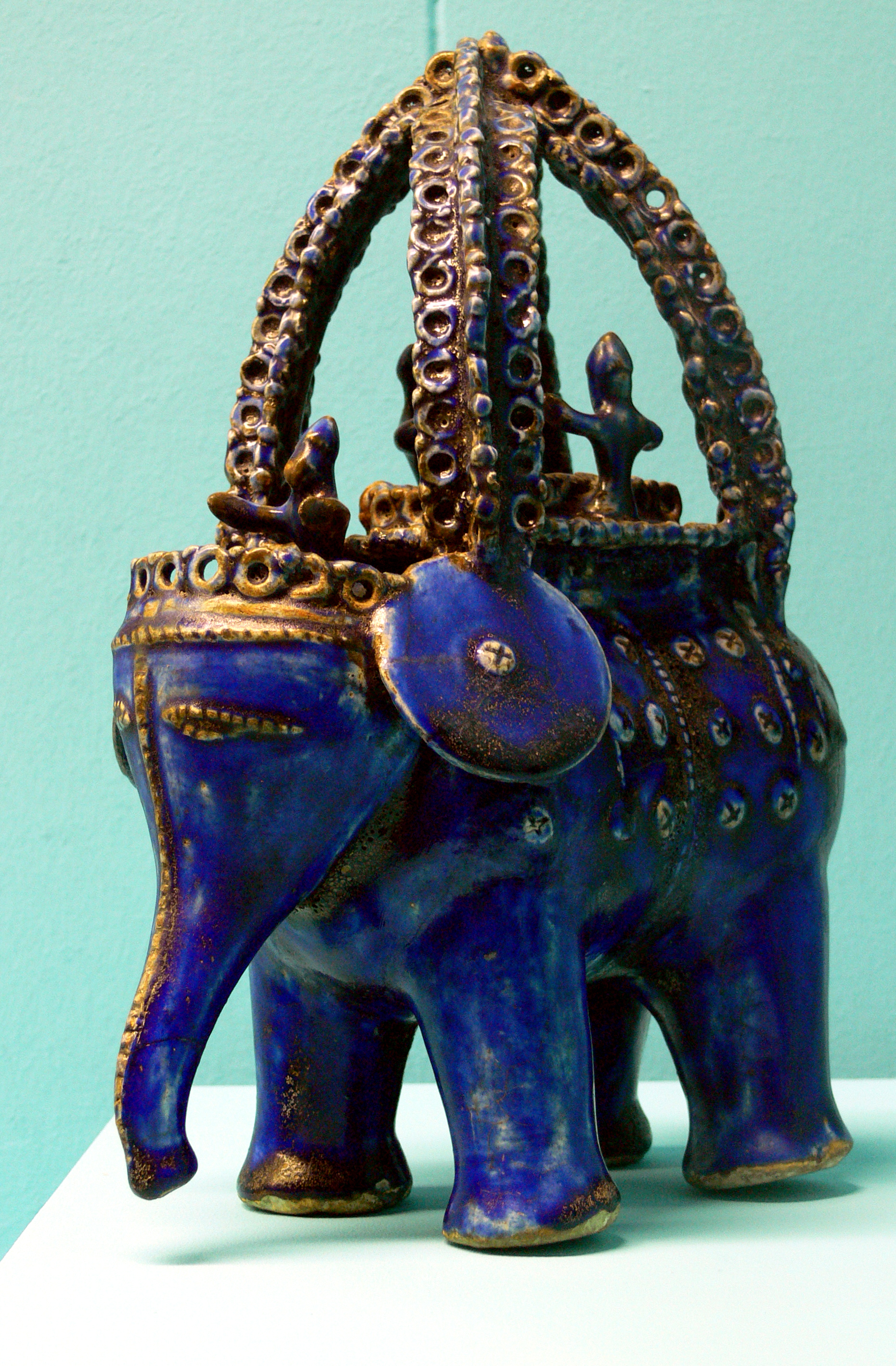
Elephant, ceramic, Iran, 13th century

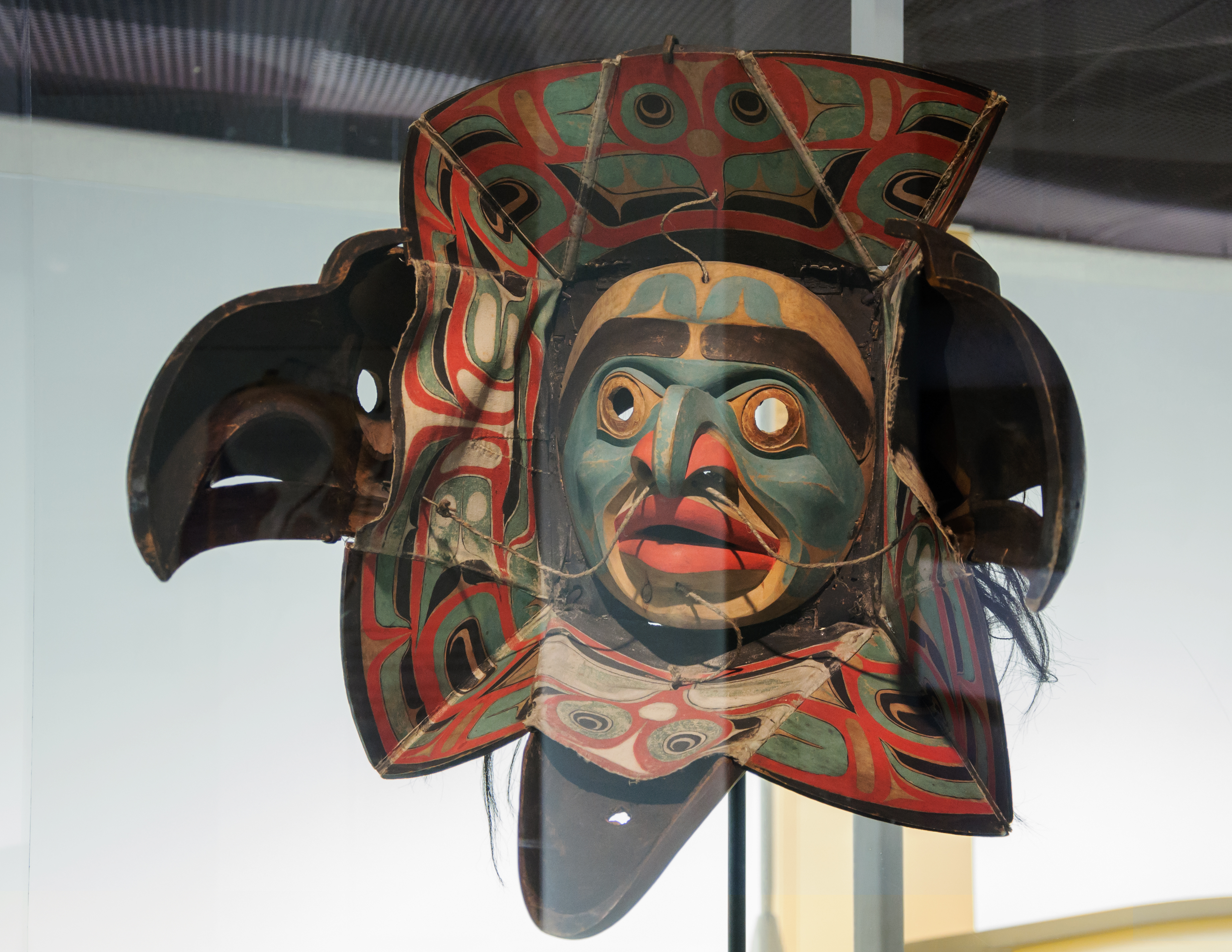
Nuxalk transformation mask, Canada, 19th century

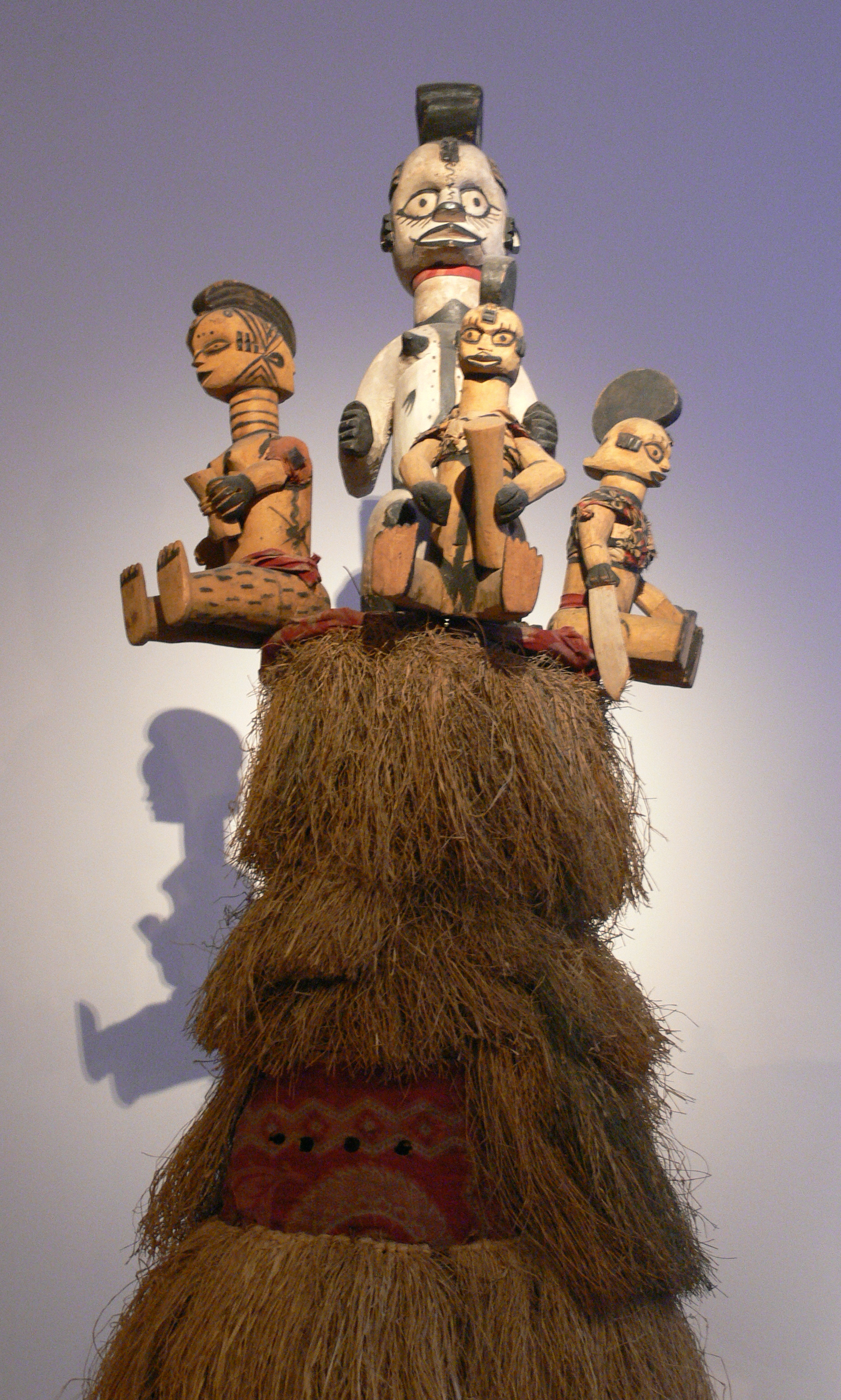
Tree mask the Ekpo-federal, Africa, 19th century
