= Benin court and ceremonial art =

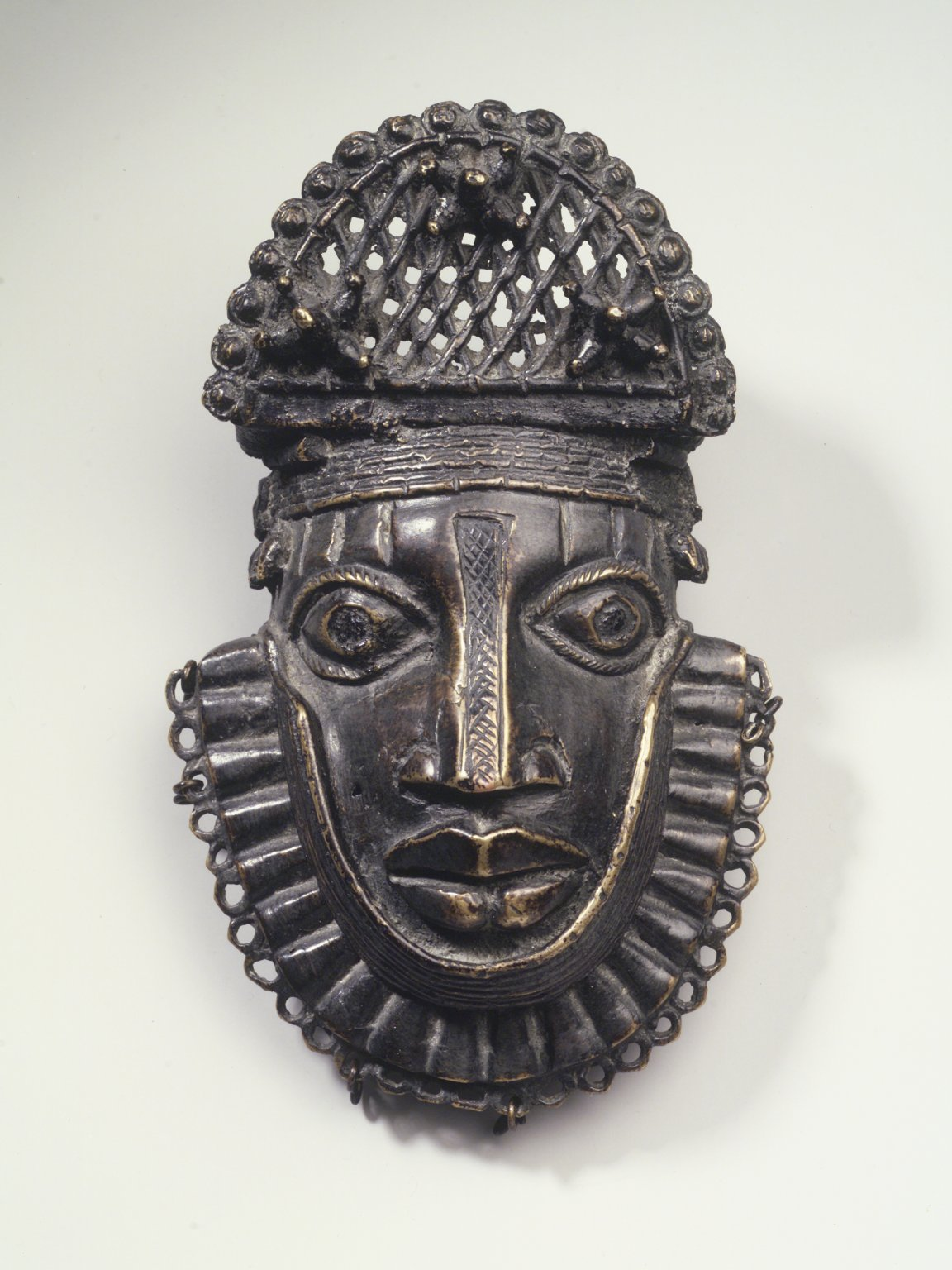
Hip ornament with face of Uhunmwun-ekue, from the collection of the Brooklyn Museum

Court and ceremonial art makes up a vital corpus of Benin art. Private and public ceremonies mark many of the important moments in Benin's yearly calendar. In the past, an elaborate series of rites were performed throughout the year to secure otherworldly support for the kingdom's well-being and to celebrate decisive events in its history.

== Pectorals, Hip Ornaments and Waist Pendants ==
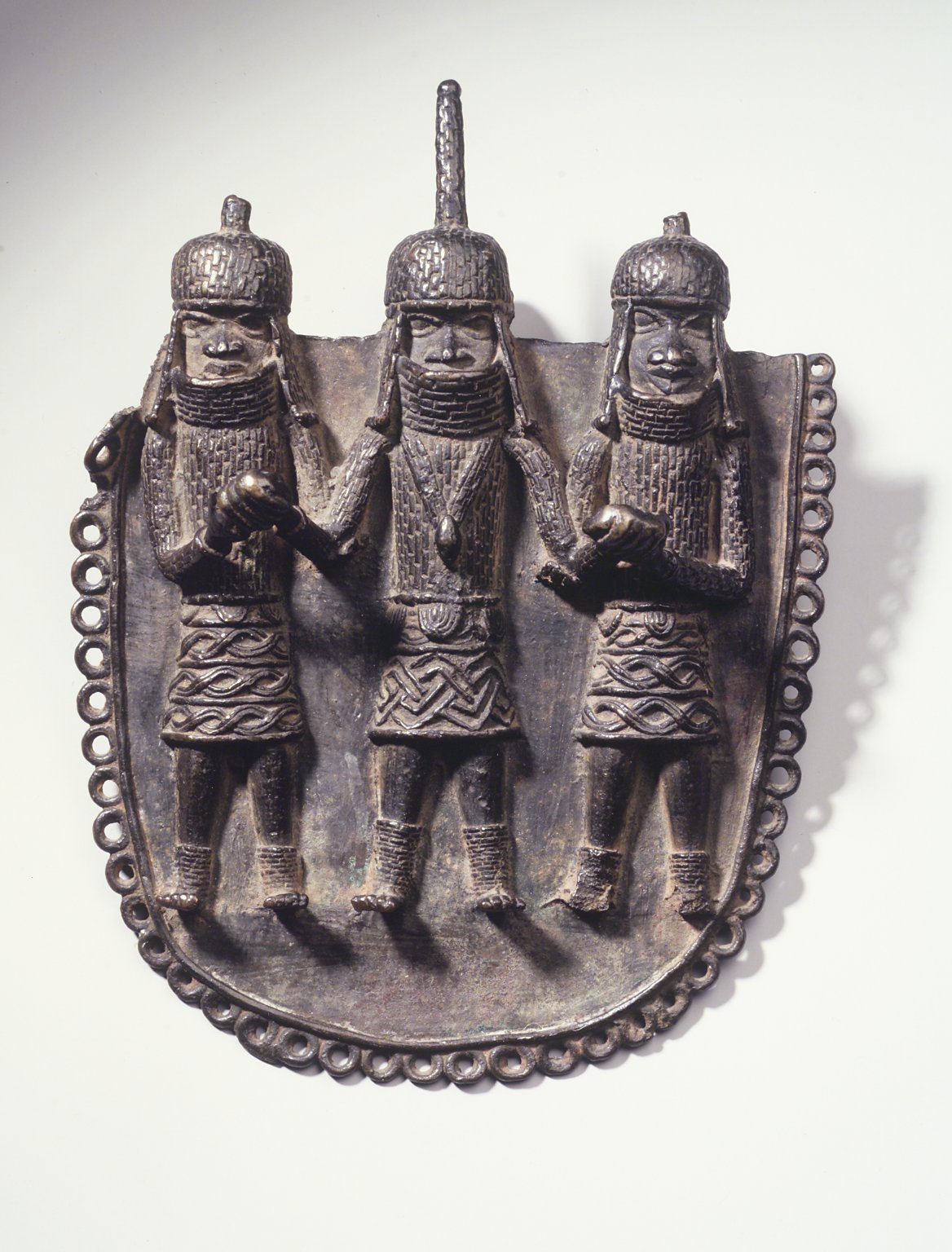
Waist Pendant with Oba and Two Attendants, from the collection of the Brooklyn Museum

Chiefs and titleholders in Benin wear a variety of brass ornaments as part of their elaborate regalia for palace ceremonies. Most are worn at the left hip, covering the closure of their wrapped skirts. Typically made of brass, they are often worn horizontally and are held in place by large loops located at the top and bottom of the back of the ornament.

Pectoral masks depict a human face symmetrically framed by an ornamental flange with loops for small metal rattles, called crotals, at the bottom, below the ears, and by a row of projecting trapezoids at the top, above the ears. The foreheads of pectoral masks are inlaid with iron rectangles, known as ikan aro ("cane of eye"), which give the face the look of determination, fierceness and power that is appropriate to a ruler.

The ornaments that chiefs wear over their left hip most often depict the human face but are different in form from the pectorals. They have a decorative flange around the lower portion of the face, usually representing either coiled mudfish, an openwork lattice or guilloche pattern, or a fluted collar, with a row of small loops directly below or behind it. A collar of coral beads is depicted below the face, and above the face is a latticework coral-beaded cap with clusters of coral beads at the edges. The face has three raised keloid scarification marks (ikharo) above each eye. Some masks are inlaid with a strip of metal down the forehead and/or nose. The most likely explanation for this marking is that it indicates urebo, a protective mixture of herbs and chalk, which was rubbed on the nose and forehead to ward off danger during festivals. Earlier scholarship suggested that sacrificial blood was also in this mixture.

Suspension loops at the top indicate that the pendant was worn at the waist. Many Benin pendants incorporated semicircular or shield-shaped fields into their designs.

== Side-blown Trumpets ==
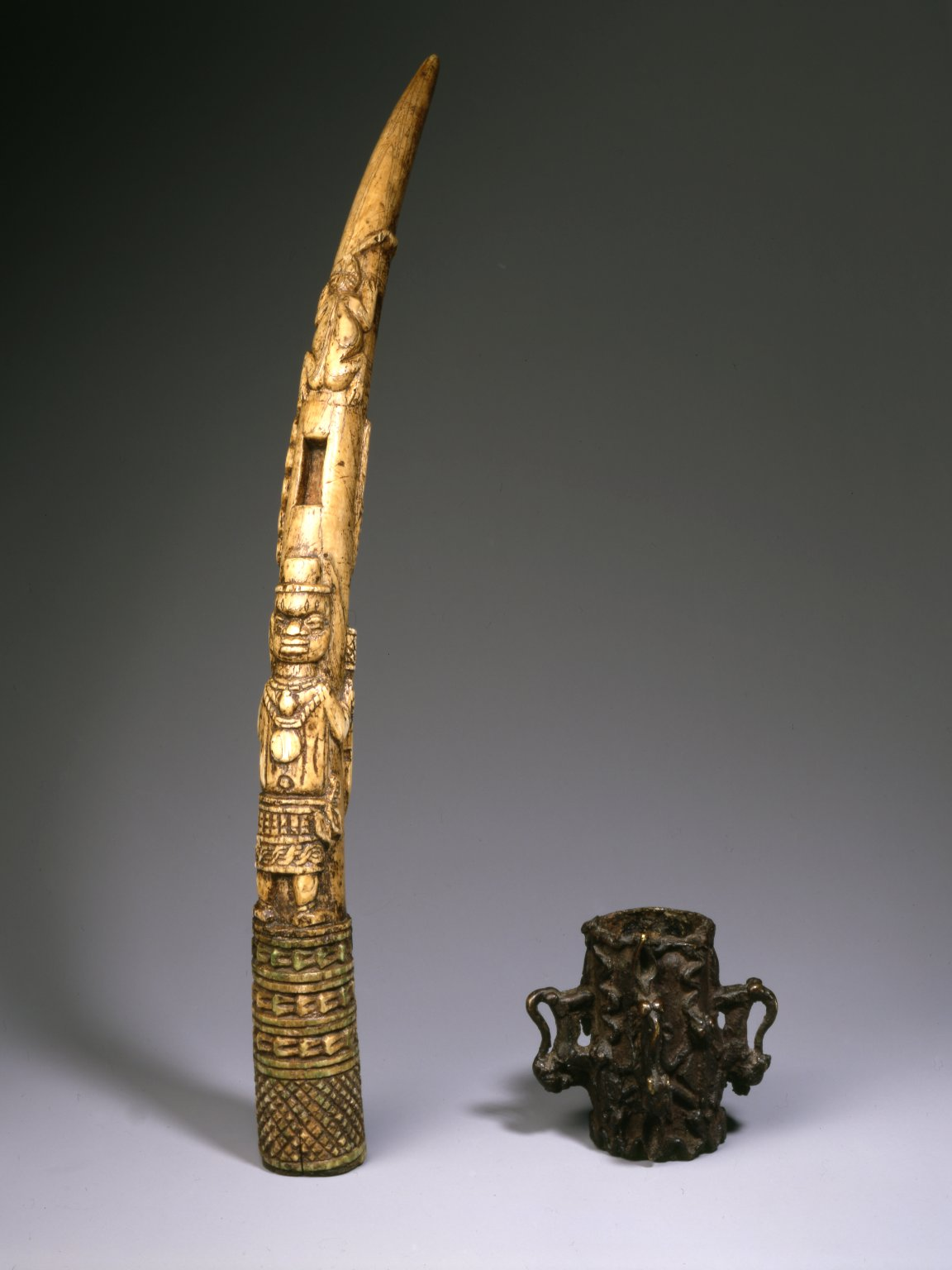
Side-blown Trumpet, from the collection of the Brooklyn Museum

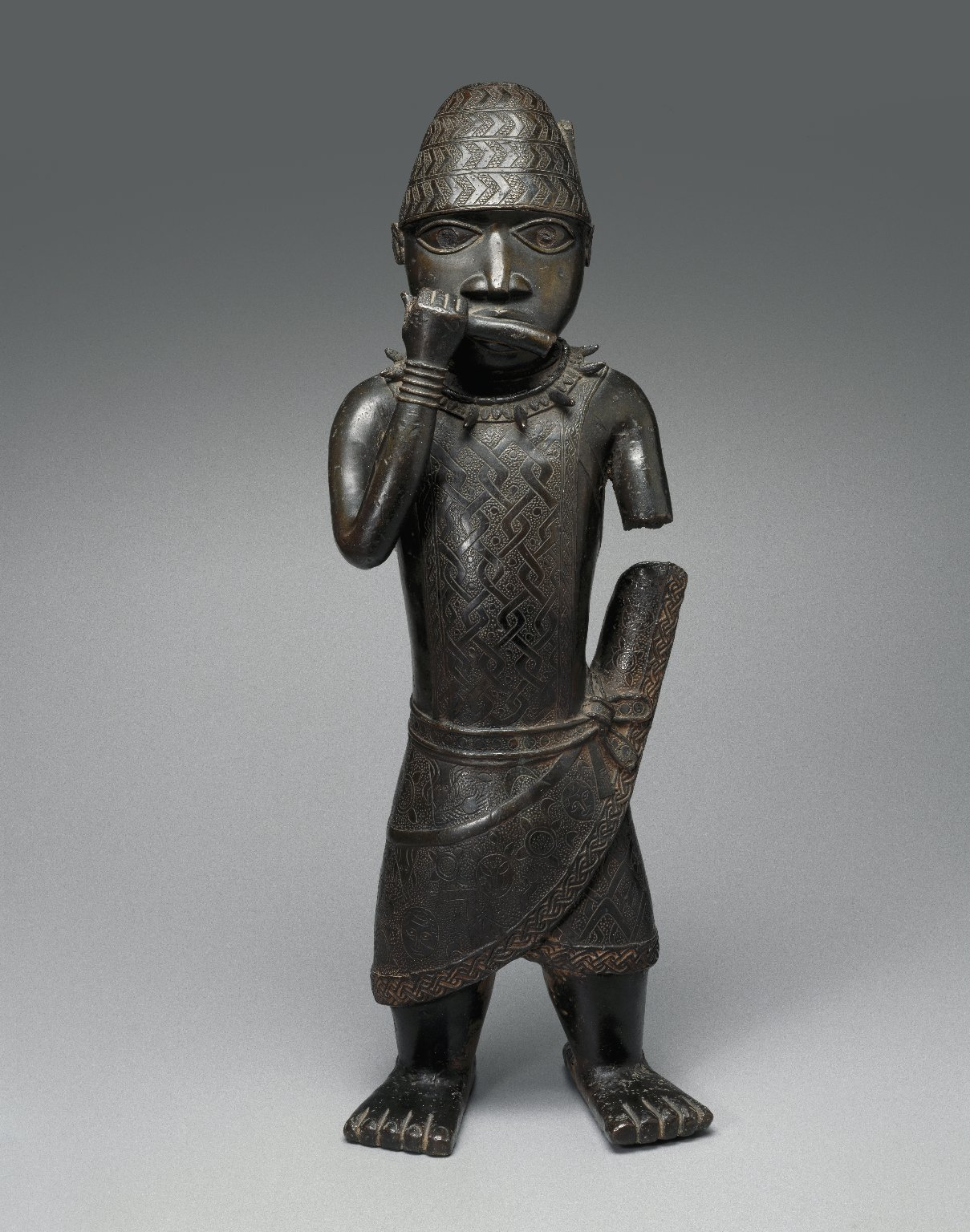
Figure of a Hornblower, from the collection of the Brooklyn Museum

Akohen are large, side-blown trumpets carved of ivory and played by the Oba's retainers when he appears in full ceremonial dress at palace rituals. The akohen glorify the Oba musically with their deep, piercing sounds, and visually, their white ivory signifying the Oba's wealth, strength and purity.

According to oral tradition, the akohen were introduced by Oba Eresonyen although other types of side-blown trumpets existed earlier.

== Brass Vessels and Implements ==
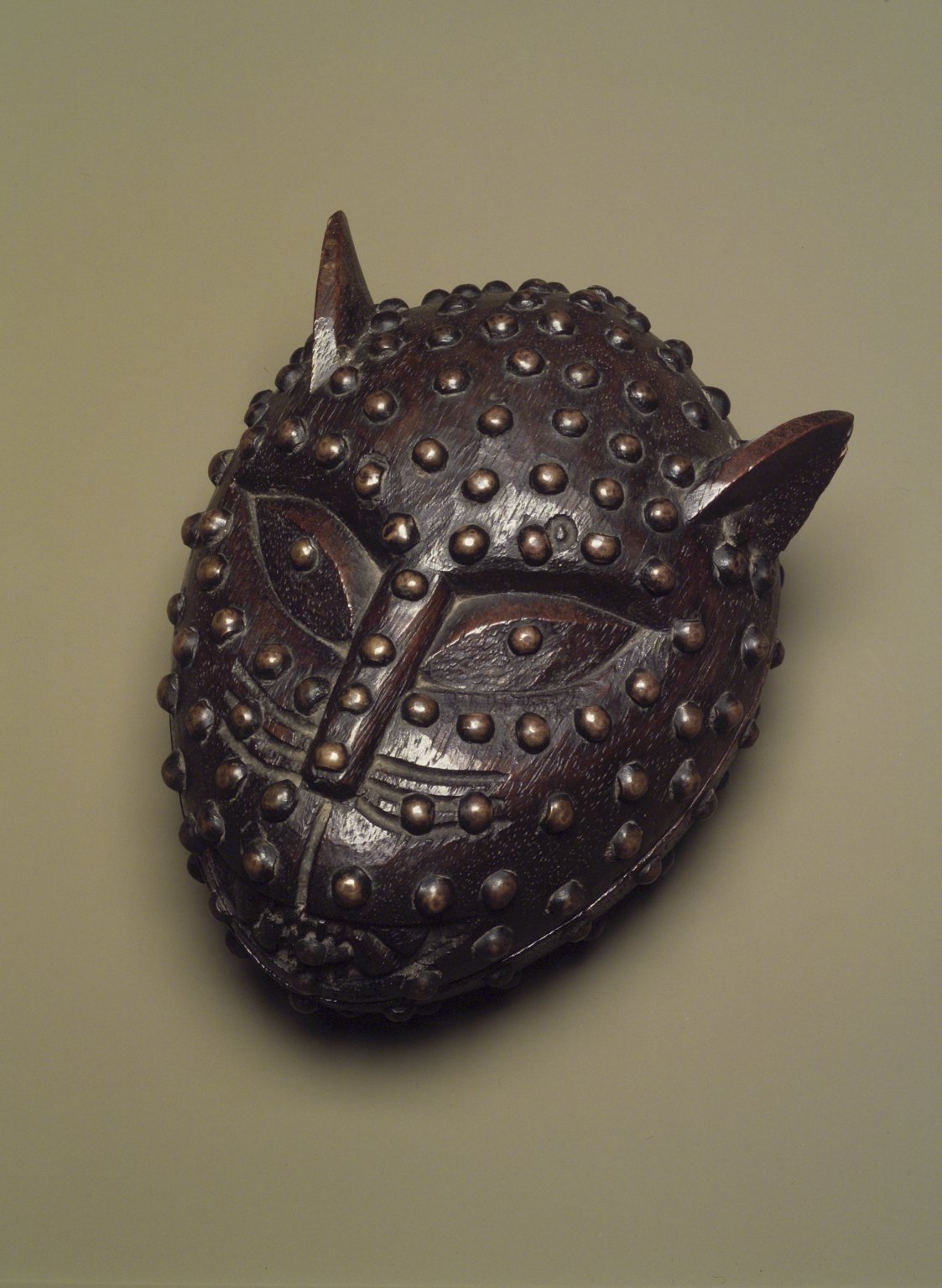
Box in the Form of a Leopards Head, from the collection of the Brooklyn Museum

A variety of brass vessels were made in Benin, including buckets, bowls, jugs, boxes and aquamaniles in the forms of leopards and rams. Historians credit Oba Ewuare, who reigned in the mid-fifteenth century, with the original acquisition of these containers for use in palace rituals. According to oral traditions, Ewuare obtained the brass vessels, along with coral-bead regalia, from the underwater palace of Olokun, the god of the sea. Called iru, these spiritually charged objects were in use in the shrine of Olokun's father, Osanobua, the creator god. According to the story, Ewuare heard voices within the vessels that repeated "ise, ise, ise," a typical ritual response. He brought the vessels back to his own palace, where they were placed on the Benin state shrine, Ebo n'Edo.

In Benin today, ritual specialists known as Emuru, who serve the Ebo n-Edo shrine, carry brass vessels with protective substances. The Ebo n'Edo shrine, its spirits, the priests who serve them, and the objects used in their rituals are seen as references to the origin of the dynasty and the authority inherited by the Obas. Benin vessels have a greater significance than their utilitarian function; they refer to the Oba's ancestral authority, to Ewuare, and to the power that stems from the Oba's relationship to Olokun.

The leopard is the most common form of zoomorphic aquamanile made in Benin. The leopard, "king of the bush," is one of the principal symbols of the Oba in Benin art, expressing his ferocious, aggressive nature.

== Gongs ==
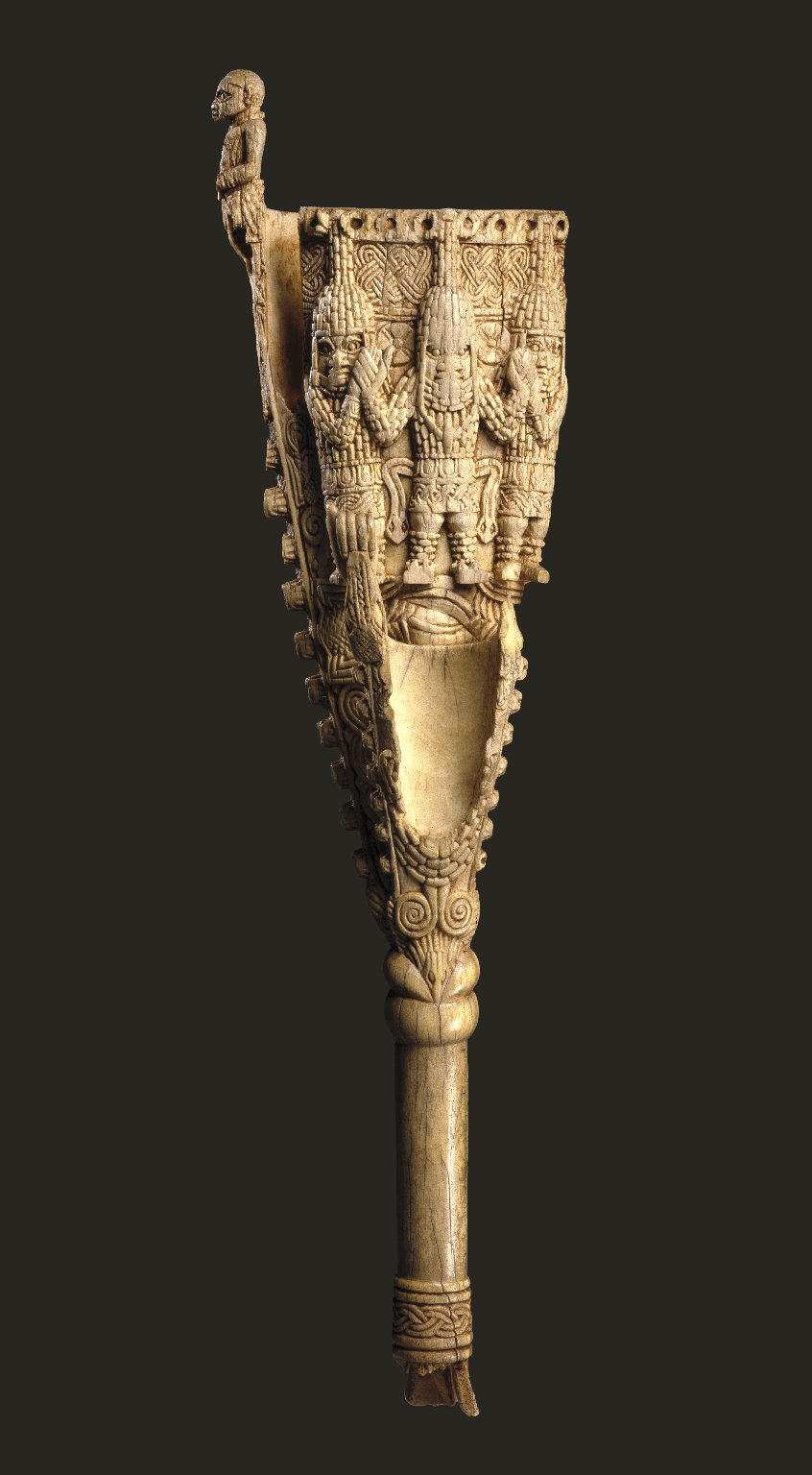
This double bell (Egogo), now in the collection of the Brooklyn Museum, is one of the oldest surviving African ivory sculptures; only six of these ivory gongs are known. Double gongs were used by the oba (king) during the Emobo ceremony to drive away evil spirits. The carving here depicts the oba, supported by his military commander and his heir.

Finely carved ivory double gongs are called such because of second, smaller resonating cups at their front. Typically, the central image is the Oba in coral regalia supported by the high priests Osa and Osuan, officials who tend the altars of the kingdom's two patron gods. These gongs are still carried today by the oba during Emobo, the last of the empowering rites of the Igue festival. The Oba gently taps the ivory instrument, creating a rhythmic sound to calm and dismiss unruly spirits from the kingdom.
