= MOWAA =

MOWAA may refer to:

- Meals on Wheels Association of America
- Museum of West African Art
