= Okukor =

Historical bronze statue from Benin City in Nigeria

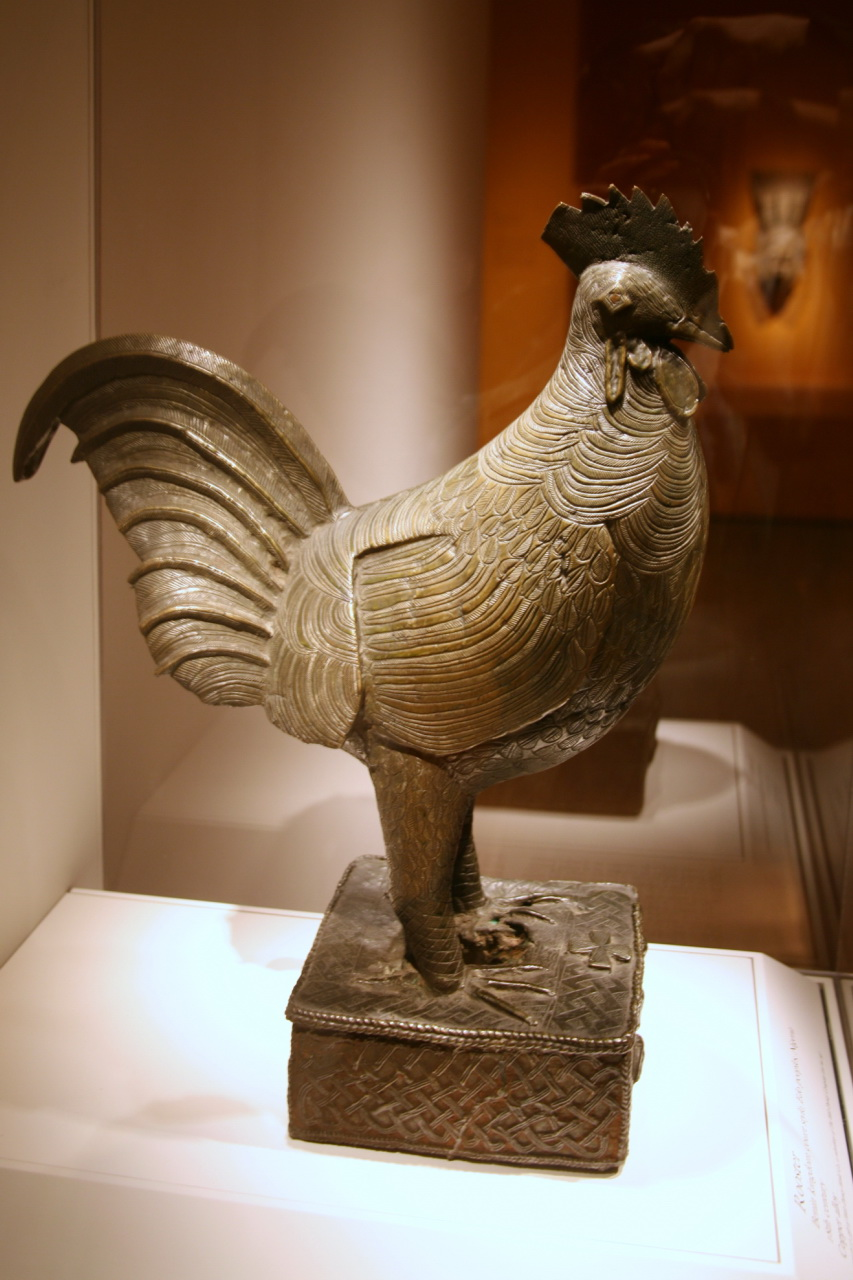
Similar example in the National Museum of African Art in Washington DC

Okukor is the name given to a bronze statue of a cock from West Africa, held by Jesus College, Cambridge, from 1905 to 2021. One of the Benin Bronzes, it was taken from the Kingdom of Benin during the Benin Expedition of 1897, a punitive expedition dispatched to punish the Oba of Benin after a Royal Niger Company delegation was ambushed and killed. It became controversial in 2016 as an example of looted art, with demands that the statue be repatriated back to Nigeria. It was transferred to Ewuare II, Oba of Benin, and Nigeria's National Commission for Museums and Monuments by Jesus College in 2021.

== Background ==
The cock is an important animal in the religion of Benin, treated as a worthy animal sacrifice to deities such as Olokun, a spirit of wealth and of the sea. More than two dozen bronze cocks (Eson) are known in the art of Benin, dated between the 17th and 19th centuries. These statues of male chickens were typically cast using a lost wax process, modelled with comb, tail and spurs, and incised patterns representing feathers, mounted on a large square base which was often decorated with a guilloche pattern. They may have been ceremonial objects, displayed on an ancestral altar commemorating an Iyoba of Benin (a queen mother), an unusual example of a male animal being used to commemorate a woman, attributable to the traditional power and privileges of the queen mother. The Oba's senior wife, and thus often the mother of a future king, was given honorific title "Eson, Ogoro Madagba" ("the cock that crows at the head of the harem").

There are examples of historic Benin bronze cocks in many museum collections, including the National Museum of African Art in Washington DC; the Metropolitan Museum of Art in New York; the Museum Five Continents (formerly the Museum für Völkerkunde) in Munich; the Pitt Rivers Museum in Oxford; the Etnografiska Museet in Stockholm; the Museum of African Art, Belgrade; and the Benin City National Museum in Nigeria.

Reproductions are still made in Nigeria by traditional processes.

The statue at Jesus College was described as an artistic masterpiece by The Guardian's art columnist, Jonathan Jones.

=== Comparable examples ===
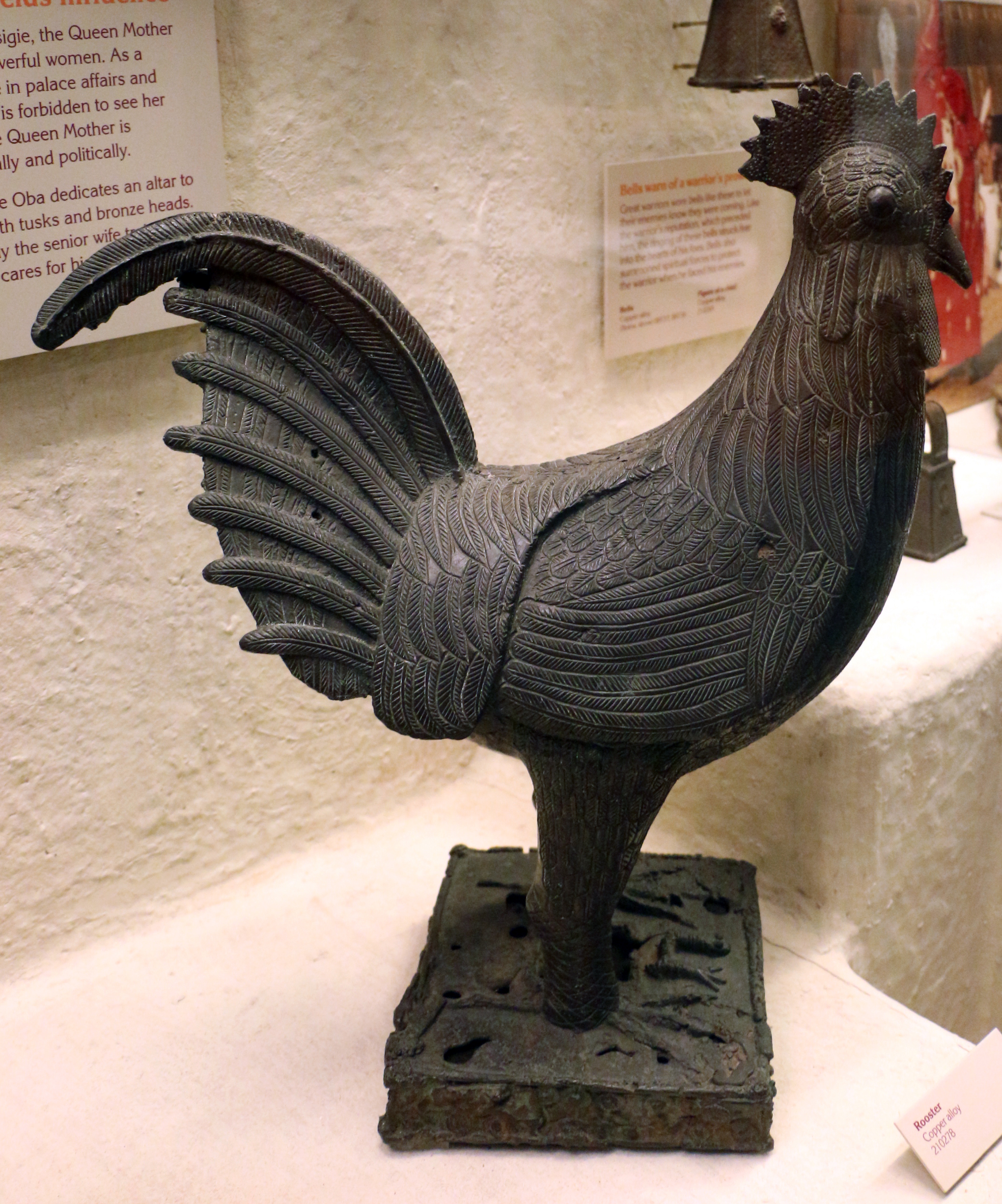
In the Field Museum of Natural History in Chicago

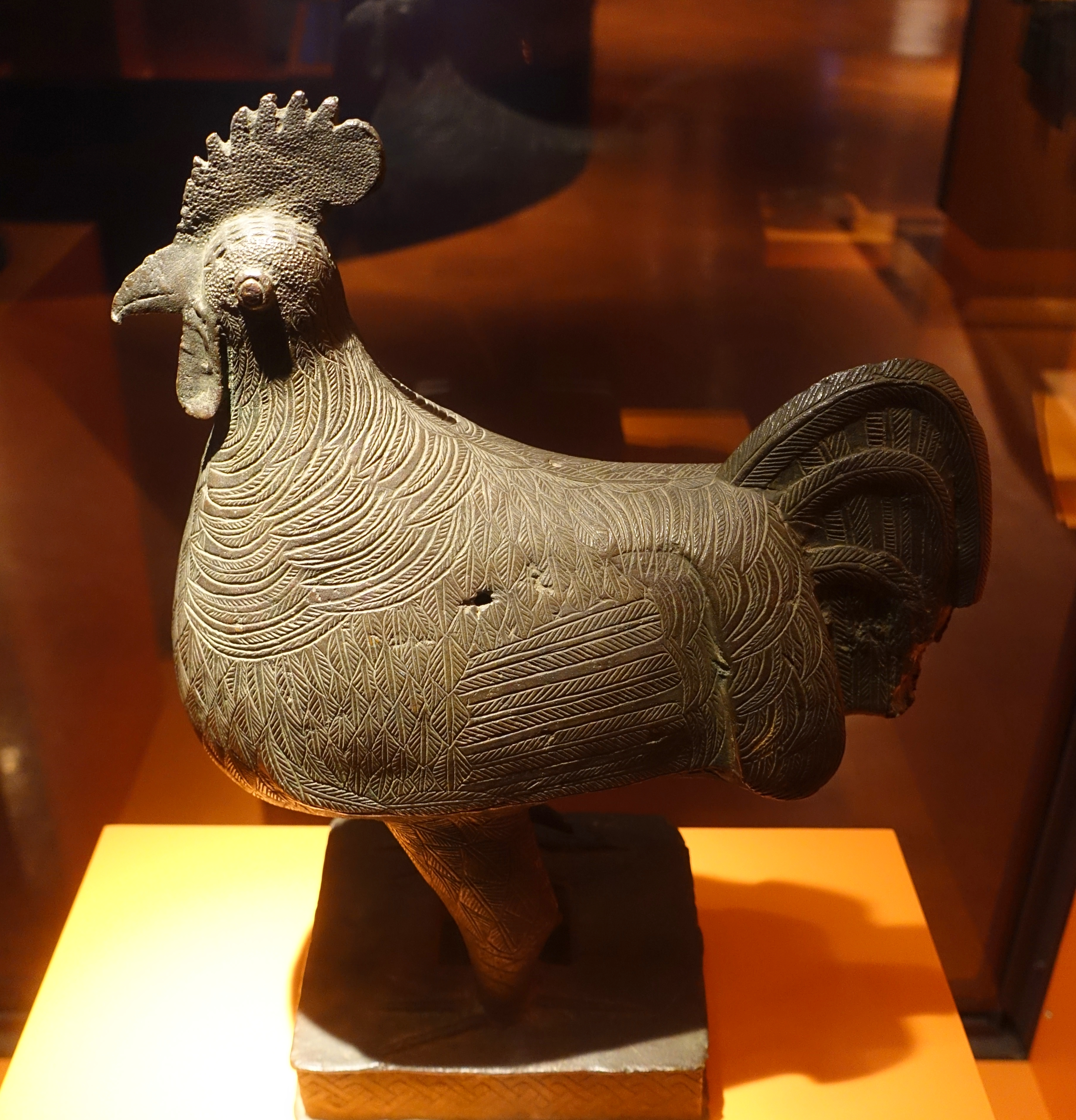
In the Museum of Ethnography, Sweden

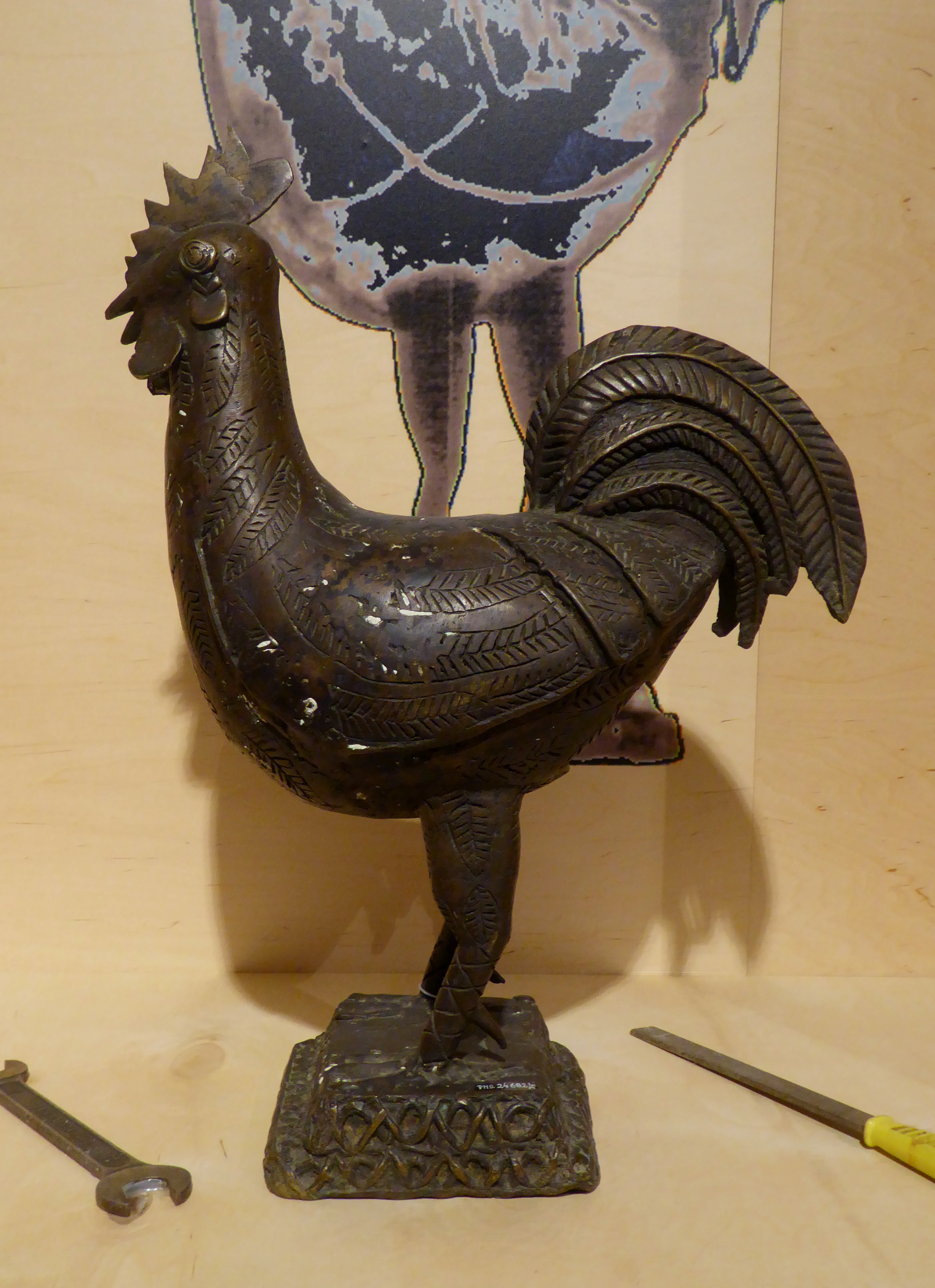
In the National Museum of Ethnography, Warsaw

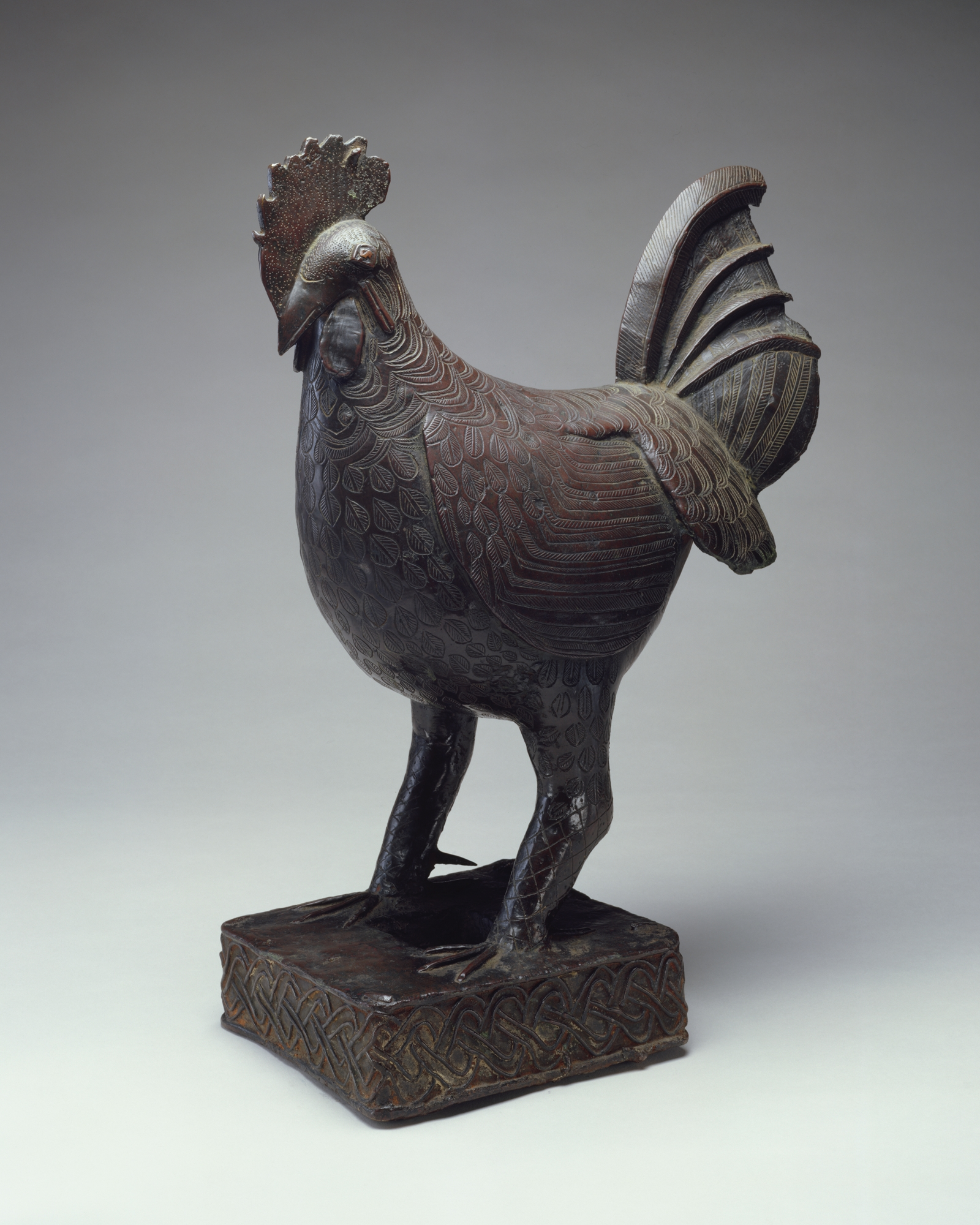
Metropolitan Museum of Art, New York

== Okukor at Jesus College ==
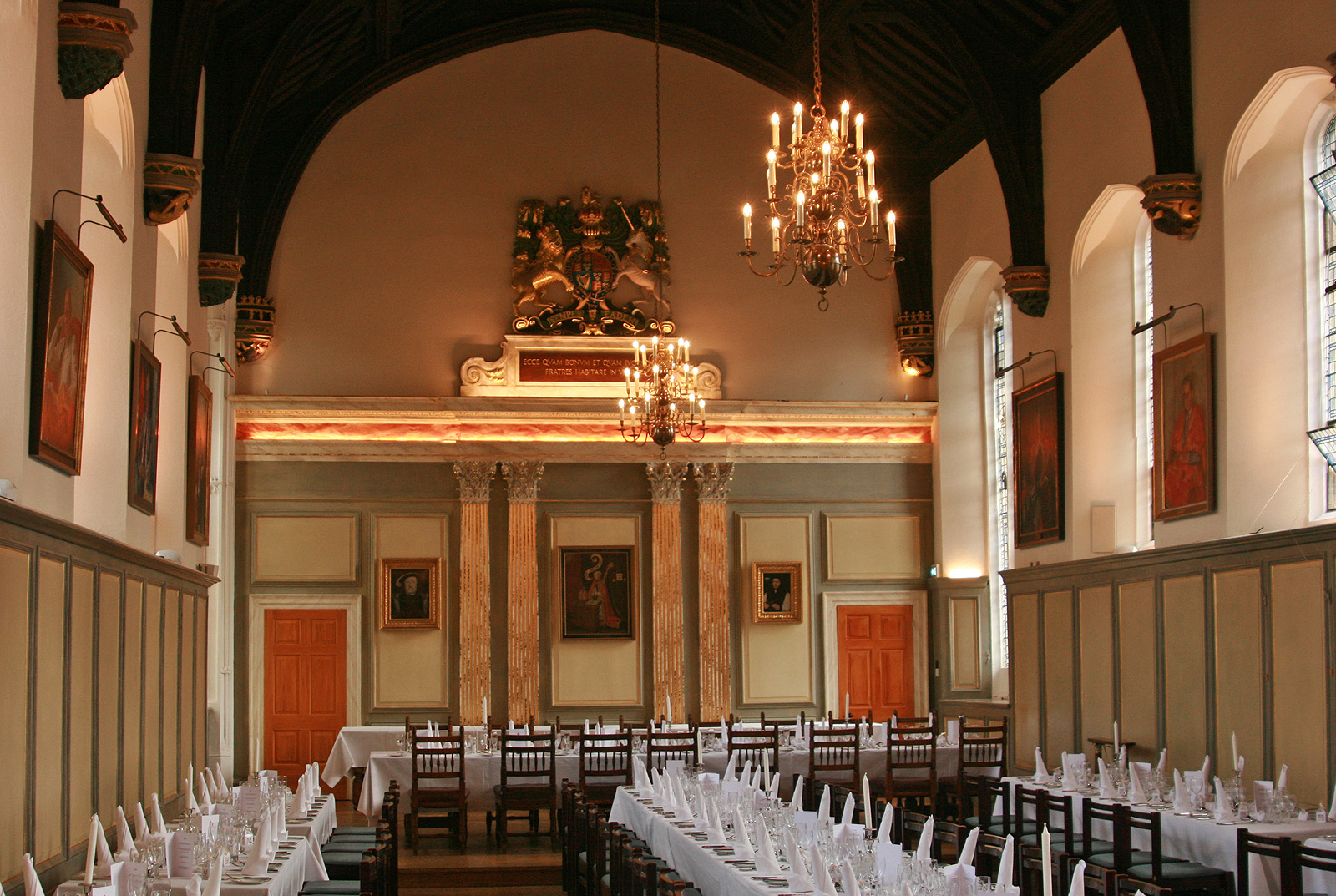
The dining hall at Jesus College, Cambridge where Okukor was displayed until 2016

Arms of Jesus College

Okukor was presumably among the items looted by George William Neville during the Benin Expedition of 1897. Neville was a Member of the Legislative Council of the Colony of Lagos and a businessman. Neville looted so many objects during the campaign that as he left the city a commandant who had been part of the expedition advised him to “push off as quickly as possible, as the fact of so many ancient heirlooms leaving the city may attract attention and possibly lead to molestation.”

In 1905 Neville presented Okukor to Jesus College, Cambridge where his son was a student. According to its records, the college “agreed gratefully to accept” the “gift of the bronze figure of a cock which formed part of the spoil captured at Benin, West Africa and to thank Mr Neville for making this appropriate gift.” The crest of Jesus College is a cockerel and the coat of arms include three cocks' heads. The cockerel symbol was taken from the family crest of the college founder Bishop John Alcock and was a form of canting arms.

The statue was displayed in the dining hall at Jesus College until March 2016, when the college council had it removed from display and agreed to consider its future.

== Repatriation debate ==
In the aftermath of the Rhodes Must Fall campaign, there were demands that the statue should be returned to Africa. In an 11-page report to the college's student union by student campaigners in February 2016, the campaigners argued that the statue needed to be returned to the "community from which it was stolen". It was removed from public display in March 2016, with the intention of repatriating it to Nigeria.

In 2019 Jesus College agreed that Okukor "belongs with the current Oba at the Court of Benin” and should be returned to Nigeria.

In December 2020, following an application by the college under s.106 of the Charities Act 2011, the Charity Commission for England and Wales authorised the transfer of the bronze to the Oba of Benin. The statue was transferred to the National Commission for Museums and Monuments of Nigeria in a ceremony at Jesus College, on 27 October 2021.
