= Erediauwa =

- Omo n'Oba n'Edo Uku Akpolokpolo

Oba of Benin
- Reign: 23 March 1979 – 29 April 2016
- Coronation: 23 March 1979
- Predecessor: Akenzua II
- Successor: Ewuare II
- Born: Solomon Aiseokhuoba Igbinoghodua Eweka; 22 June 1923; Benin City, British Nigeria
- Died: 29 April 2016 (aged 92); Benin City, Edo State, Nigeria
Regnal name
- Erediauwa
- House: House of Eweka
- Father: Oba Akenzua II

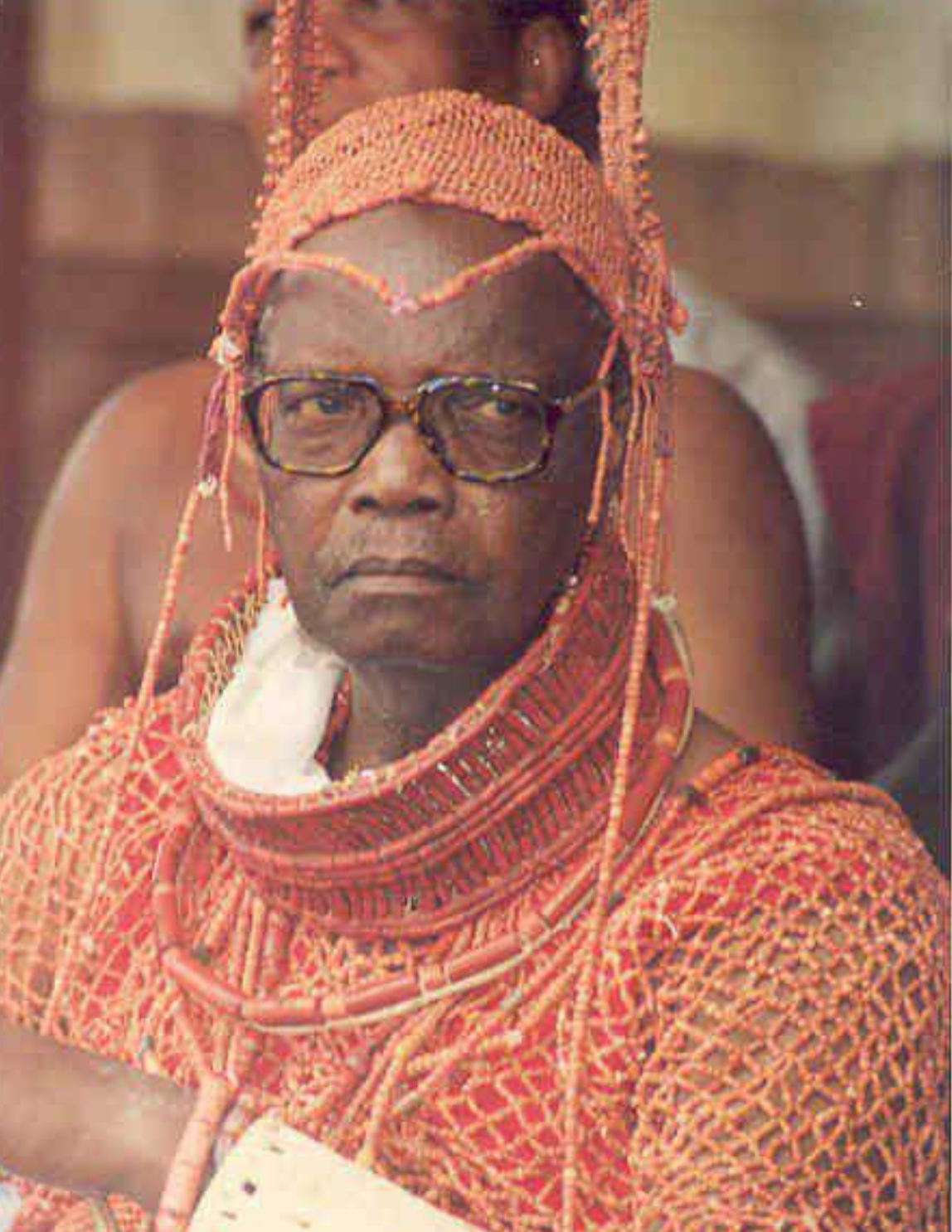

Erediauwa (22 June 1923 – April 2016) was the thirty-eighth Oba of Benin, traditional ruler of the Edo people in Benin City, Edo State, Nigeria. Formerly known as Prince Solomon Akenzua, Oba Erediauwa's full title was His Royal Majesty Omo n'Oba n'Edo Uku Akpolokpolo Erediauwa I. He was succeeded by Ewuare II.

Oba Erediauwa took on the title and duties as traditional head of state and rightful heir of the Benin Empire when he was crowned, succeeding his father, Oba Akenzua II, in a ceremony held in Benin City, Nigeria, on 23 March 1979.

== Biography ==
Erediauwa was born on 22 June 1923, son of Oba Akenzua II. Before being crowned he was known as Prince Solomon Aiseokhuoba Igbinoghodua Akenzua. He attended Government College, Ibadan (1939–1945), then Yaba College, before going to King's College, Cambridge to study Law and Administration. He joined the Eastern Nigeria Civil Service in 1957 as a District Officer, later moving to the Federal Civil Service where he retired as Permanent Secretary, Ministry of Health in 1973. For a short period he was the regional representative of Gulf Oil. In 1975, he was appointed Commissioner for Finance in Bendel State during the Military Administration of Major-General George Agbazika Innih. Ascending to the throne on 23 March 1979, Erediauwa celebrated his 30th anniversary in 2009. During this period, he several times acted as a peacemaker between politicians. For example, he intervened in a dispute between Abia State governor Orji Uzor Kalu and Tony Anenih, Chairman of the People's Democratic Party Board of Trustees, and resolved another face-off involving Anenih and former Edo State Governor Lucky Igbinedion. Apart from the ceremonial aspects, his 30th anniversary festival was a week long carnival and a showcase of Benin arts and culture, with numerous performances of traditional music and dance, as well as an art exhibition and food fair. His death was announced on 29 April 2016. The statement did not say when and how he died.

== Public image ==
In Benin, the Oba is considered to be the only representative of the supreme deity and is considered a god in his own right. He is believed to be ordained by cosmic consent. This means the people considered him to have the ability to either venerate or curse a community, so although he ruled with respect and kindness for his people, they also feared him.

Erediauwa's media-friendly image increased the royal family's engagement with the Benin Kingdom and Nigeria in general. Previously approached with apprehension by the public and media practitioners, the gates of the palace were opened, which normalised communication with the Oba's subjects through a quarterly press conference.

== Awards ==
In October 2022, a Nigerian national honor of Commander Of The Order Of The Federal Republic (CFR) was conferred on him by President Muhammadu Buhari.

Erediauwa Oba of Benin Born: 22 June 1923 Died: 29 April 2016
Regnal titles
Preceded by Akenzua II	Oba of Benin; 1979 – 2016	Succeeded by Ewuare II
