= Benin Bronzes =

Metal plaques and sculptures from the Kingdom of Benin

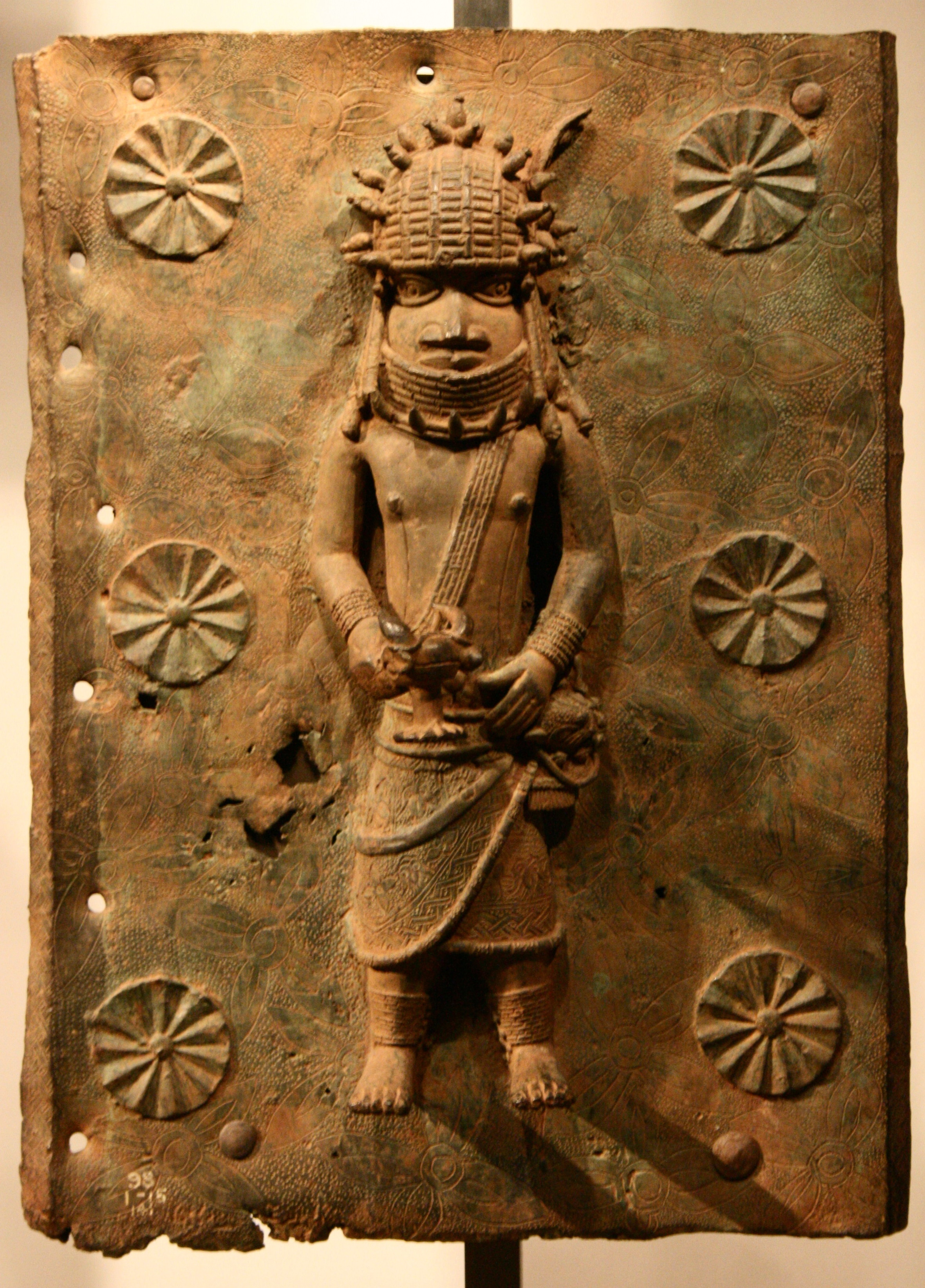
A Benin Bronze plaque on display in the British Museum

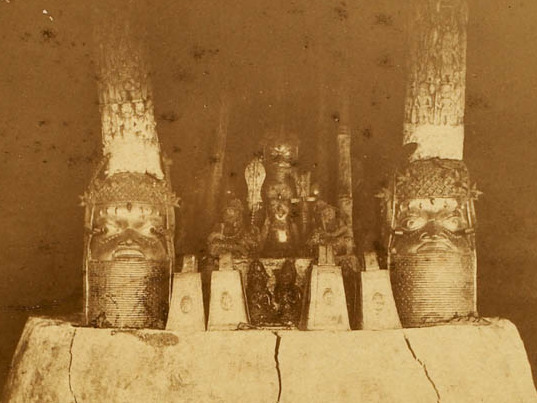
Ancestral shrine in Royal Palace, Benin City, 1891: the earliest-known photograph of the Oba's compound. Note 'bronze' heads at both ends of the shrine.

The Benin Bronzes are a group of several thousand (Note: The exact number of pieces is uncertain. Most sources speak of a thousand pieces or several thousand pieces. According to Nevadomsky, there were between 3,000 and 5,000 pieces in total.) metal plaques and sculptures that decorated the royal palace of the Kingdom of Benin, in what is now Edo State, Nigeria. The metal plaques were produced by the Guild of Benin Bronze Casters, now located in Igun Street, also known as Igun-Eronmwon Quarters. Collectively, the objects form the best examples of Benin art and were created from the fourteenth century by artists of the Edo people. The plaques, which in the Edo language are called Ama, depict scenes or represent themes in the history of the kingdom. Apart from the plaques, other sculptures in brass or bronze include portrait heads, jewellery, and smaller pieces.

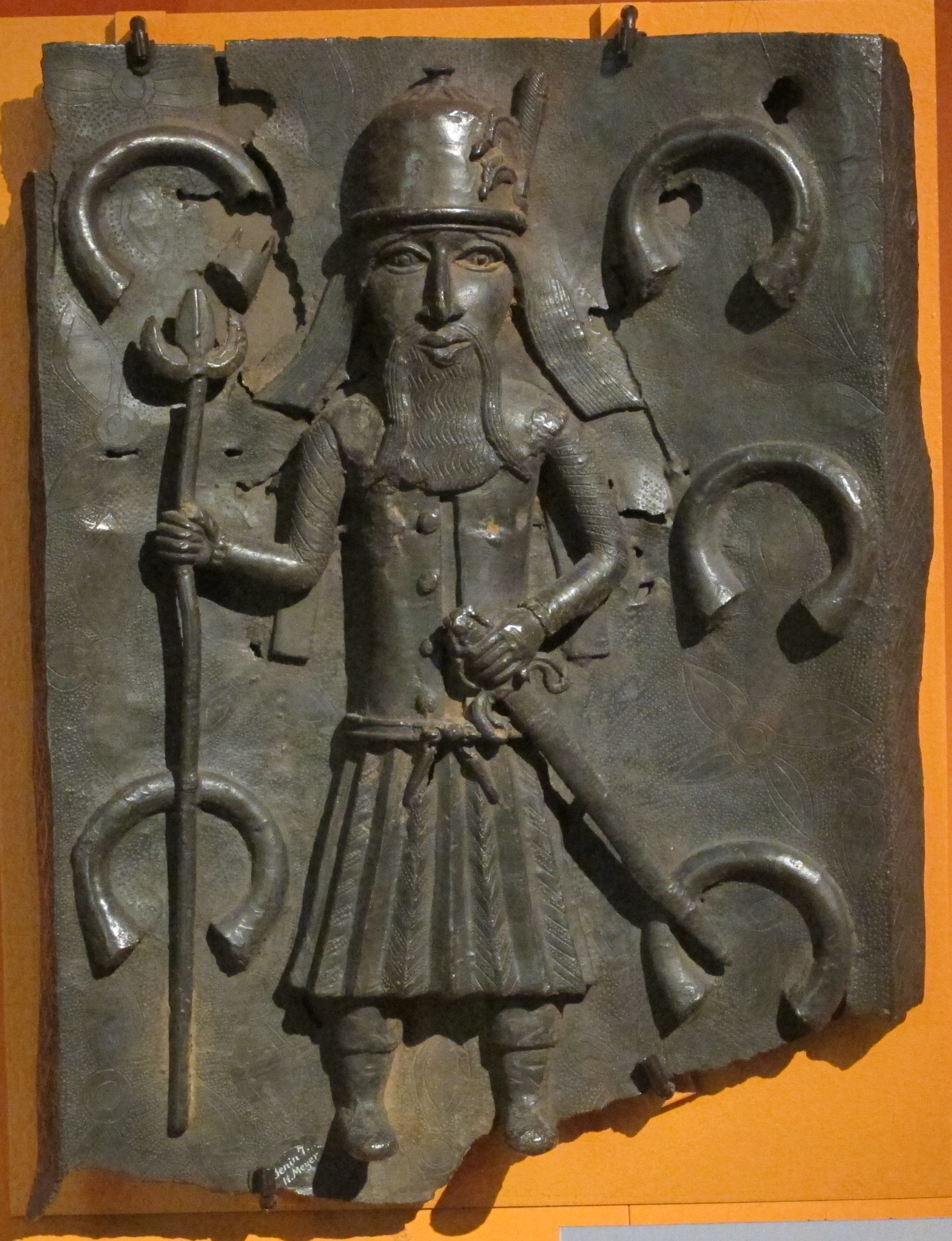
A 16th-century Benin Bronze depicting a Portuguese soldier, with manillas in the background (Leipzig Museum of Ethnography)

Some of the dramatic sculptures date to the fourteenth century, but the bulk of the collection dates to the fifteenth and sixteenth centuries. It is believed that two "Golden Ages" in Benin metal workmanship occurred during the reigns of Esigie (fl. 1550) and of Eresoyen (1735–1750), when their workmanship achieved its highest quality.

Most of the plaques and other objects were taken by British forces during the Benin Expedition of 1897 as the British Empire's control was being consolidated in Southern Nigeria. This expedition was positioned by British sources as retaliation for a massacre of an unarmed party of British envoys and a large number of their African bearers in January 1897. Following the expedition, two hundred pieces were taken to the British Museum in London, while the rest were taken to other European museums. A large number are held by the British Museum, with other notable collections in Germany and the United States.

Late 19th-century scholars O. M. Dalton and Charles Hercules Read erroneously concluded that Benin knowledge of metallurgy came from the Portuguese traders, who were in contact with Benin in the early modern period. The Kingdom of Benin was a hub of African civilization long before Portuguese traders visited, and bronzes were made in Benin prior to the arrival of the Portuguese. The Benin bronze sculpture tradition is thought to have derived from or been influenced by that of the older nearby Kingdom of Ife in southwest Nigeria.

While the collection is known as the Benin Bronzes, like most West African "bronzes" the pieces are mostly made of brass of variable composition. (Note: The British Museum notes that the term "copper alloy" is more appropriate in museology as it avoids the distinction between brass and bronze.) There are also pieces made of mixtures of bronze and brass, of wood, of ceramic, and of ivory, among other materials. The metal pieces were made using lost-wax casting and are considered among the best African sculptures made using this technique. Benin began to trade ivory, pepper, and slaves with the Portuguese in the late 15th century and incorporated the use of manillas (brass ingots in the form of bracelets, bought from the Portuguese) as a metal source in their sculpture. The manillas' brass, previously suggested to come from The Netherlands, is now thought to come from the Rhineland region of Germany.

== Pre-1897 significance ==
The time before 1897, in the period of the kingdom of Benin, was identified as the relative independence and power, also known as the Edo Empire. The pre-1897 significance of the Benin Kingdom, governed by the obas (kings), also included control over trade and territory and nurturing the production of bronze and ivory art. The kingdom also encountered challenges from the British because they were trying to gain access to Benin resources.

== History ==
=== Social context and creation ===
Many of the dramatic sculptures date to the thirteenth century, and a large part of the collection dates to the fifteenth and sixteenth centuries. It is believed that two "Golden Ages" in Benin metal workmanship occurred during the reigns of the obas Esigie (fl. 1550) and of Eresoyen (1735–1750), when their workmanship achieved its highest quality.

"The king's palace or court is a square, and is as large as the town of Haarlem and entirely surrounded by a special wall, like that which encircles the town. It is divided into many magnificent palaces, houses, and apartments of the courtiers, and comprises beautiful and long square galleries...resting on wooden pillars, from top to bottom covered with cast copper, on which are engraved the pictures of their war exploits and battles, and are kept very clean."

— Olfert Dapper, a Dutch writer, describing Benin in his book Description of Africa (1668)

The Kingdom of Benin, which occupied southern parts of present-day Nigeria between the fourteenth and nineteenth centuries, was rich in sculptures of diverse materials, such as iron, bronze, wood, ivory and terra cotta. The palace of the Oba (king) of Benin in Benin City, the site of production for the royal ancestral altars, also was the site for an elaborate court ceremonial life in which the oba, his warriors, chiefs and titleholders, priests, members of the palace societies and their constituent guilds, foreign merchants and mercenaries, and numerous retainers and attendants all took part. The palace, a vast sprawling agglomeration of buildings and courtyards, was the setting for hundreds of rectangular brass plaques whose relief images portray the persons and events that animated the court.

Bronze and ivory objects had a variety of functions in the ritual and courtly life of the Kingdom of Benin. They were used principally to decorate the royal palace, which contained many bronze works. They were hung on the pillars of the palace by nails punched through them. As a courtly art, their principal objective was to glorify the oba, the divine king, and the history of his imperial power or to honour the Iyoba of Benin (the queen mother). Art in the Kingdom of Benin took many forms, of which bronze and brass reliefs and the heads of kings and queen mothers are the best known. Bronze receptacles, bells, ornaments, jewellery, and ritual objects also possessed aesthetic qualities and originality, demonstrating the skills of their makers, although they are often eclipsed by figurative works in bronze and ivory carvings.

In tropical Africa the technique of lost-wax casting was developed early, as the works from Benin show. When a king died, his successor would order that a bronze head be made of his predecessor. Approximately 170 of these sculptures exist, and the oldest date from the twelfth century. The oba monopolized the materials that were most difficult to obtain, such as gold, elephant tusks, and bronze. These kings made possible the creation of the splendid Benin bronzes; thus, the royal courts contributed substantially to the development of sub-Saharan art. In 1939, heads very similar to those of the Kingdom of Benin were discovered in Ife, the holy city of the Yoruba, which dated to the fourteenth and fifteenth centuries. This discovery supported an earlier tradition holding that it was artists from Ife who had taught Benin the techniques of bronze metalworking. Recognition of the antiquity of the technology in Benin advanced when these sculptures were dated definitively to that era.

=== European interest and the Benin Expedition of 1897 ===
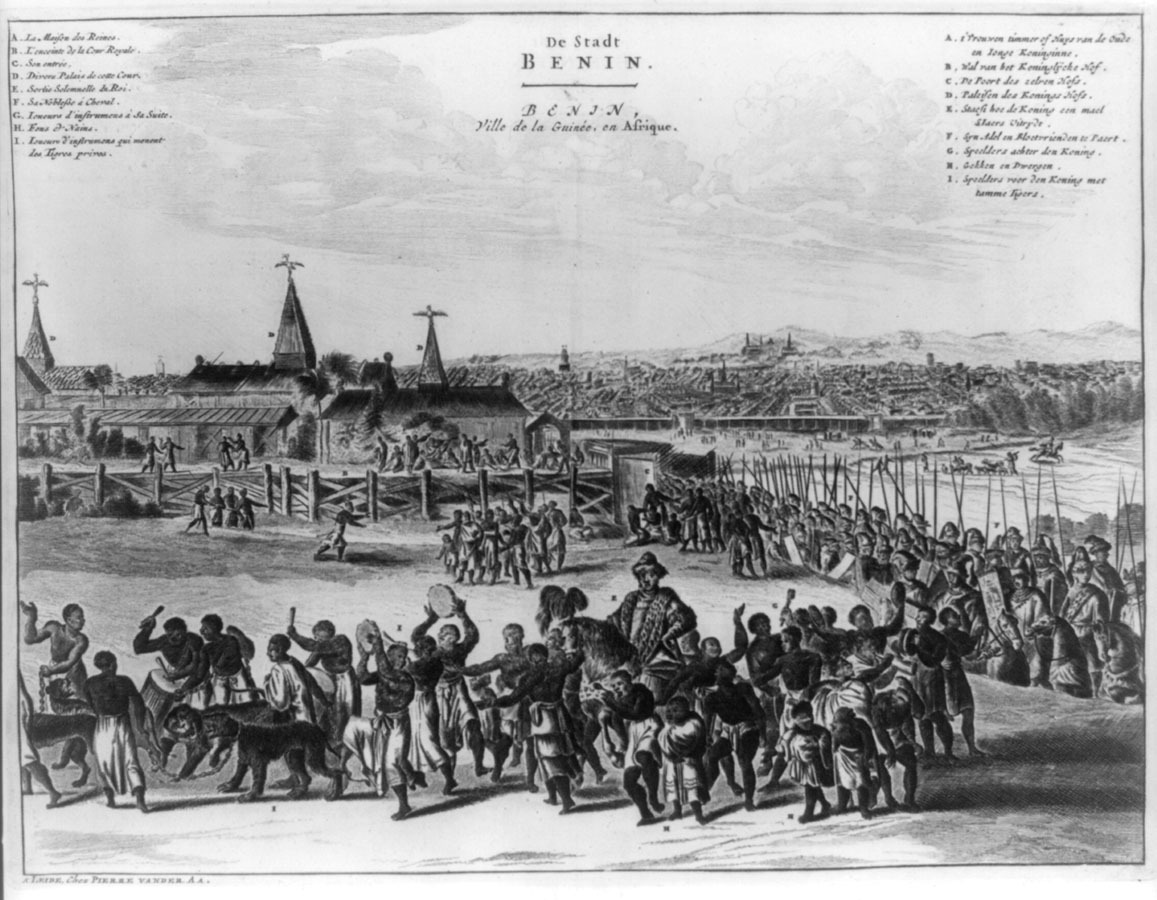
An idealised depiction of Benin City by a Dutch artist in the 1686 French edition of Olfert Dapper's Description of Africa (1668).

Few examples of African art had been collected by Europeans prior to the nineteenth century, though European printed books already included images of Benin City and of the oba&apos:s palace from the early 1600s onward. Only at the beginning of the nineteenth century, when colonization and missionary activity began, did larger numbers of African works begin to be taken to Europe, where they were described as simple curiosities of "pagan" cults. This attitude changed after the Benin Expedition of 1897.

In 1897, the vice consul general James Robert Phillips, of the Niger Coast Protectorate, together with six other British officials, two businessmen, translators, and 215 porters, set off toward Benin from the small port of Sapele, Nigeria. The true intention of the visit is disputed. The delegation's stated aim was to negotiate with the oba of Benin, while some historians contend that it was a reconnaissance mission disguised as a peaceful diplomatic delegation with the goal of ultimately overthrowing the oba. Although they had given word of their intended visit, they were later informed that their journey must be delayed, because no foreigner could enter the city while rituals were being conducted; however, the travellers ignored the warning and continued on their expedition. The survivors said that they were ambushed at the south of the city by the oba's warriors, and only two Europeans survived the ensuing massacre.

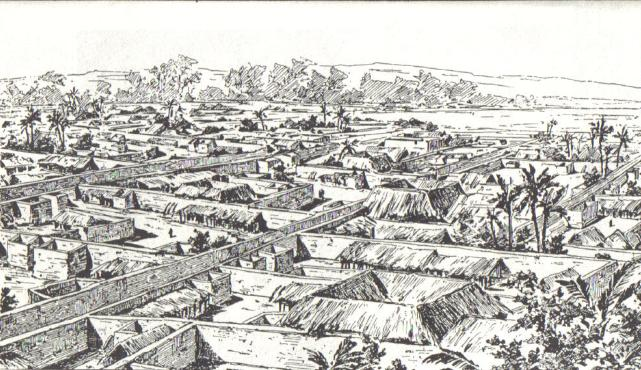
Illustration of Benin City in 1897, drawn by a British official

News of the incident reached London eight days later and a naval punitive expedition was organized immediately, which was to be directed by Admiral Harry Rawson. British forces sacked and destroyed Benin City. Following the attack, the victors took the works of art decorating the Royal Palace and the residences of the nobility, which had been accumulated over many centuries. According to the official account of this event written by the British, the attack was warranted because the local people had ambushed a peaceful mission, and because the expedition liberated the population from a reign of terror. A 2020 book suggests that; "since the 1960s, historians have increasingly understood the expedition to depose Oba Ovonramwen Nogbaisi (Overami) who had acceded to the throne in 1888, not as a retaliation, but to have been dictated by policy for a long time." Some consider that this creates an ambiguity surrounding the objects' ownership which has bearing on the possible modern return of the bronzes to Benin.

The works taken by the British were a treasure hoard of bronze and ivory sculptures, including king heads, queen mother heads, leopard figurines, bells, and a great number of images sculpted in high relief, all of which were executed with a mastery of lost-wax casting. In 1910, German researcher Leo Frobenius carried out an expedition to Africa with the aim of collecting works of African art for museums in his country. By 1988, perhaps as few as fifty pieces remained in Nigeria while approximately 2,400 pieces were held in European and American collections.

=== Division among museums ===
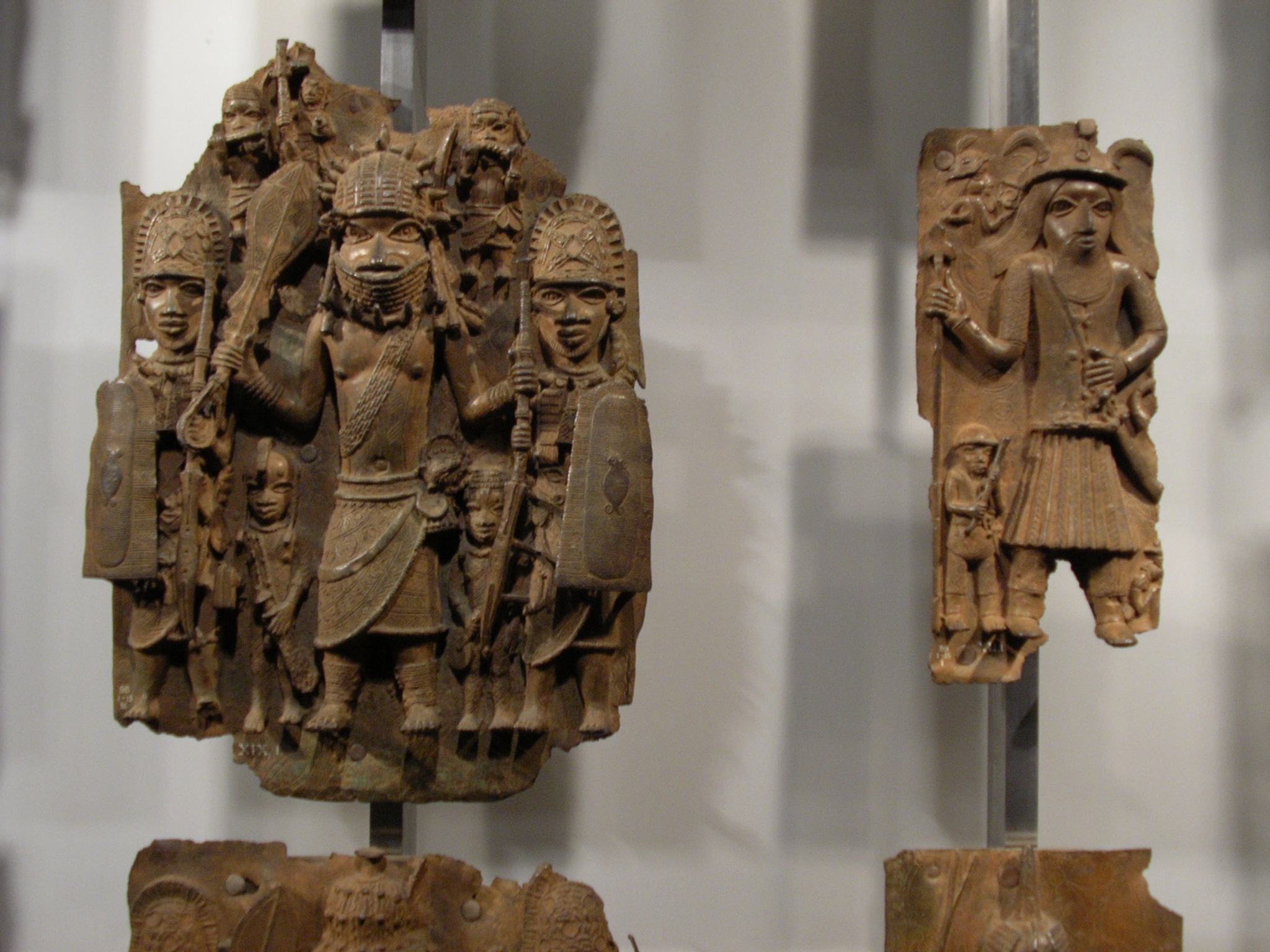
Two Benin Bronzes in London's British Museum

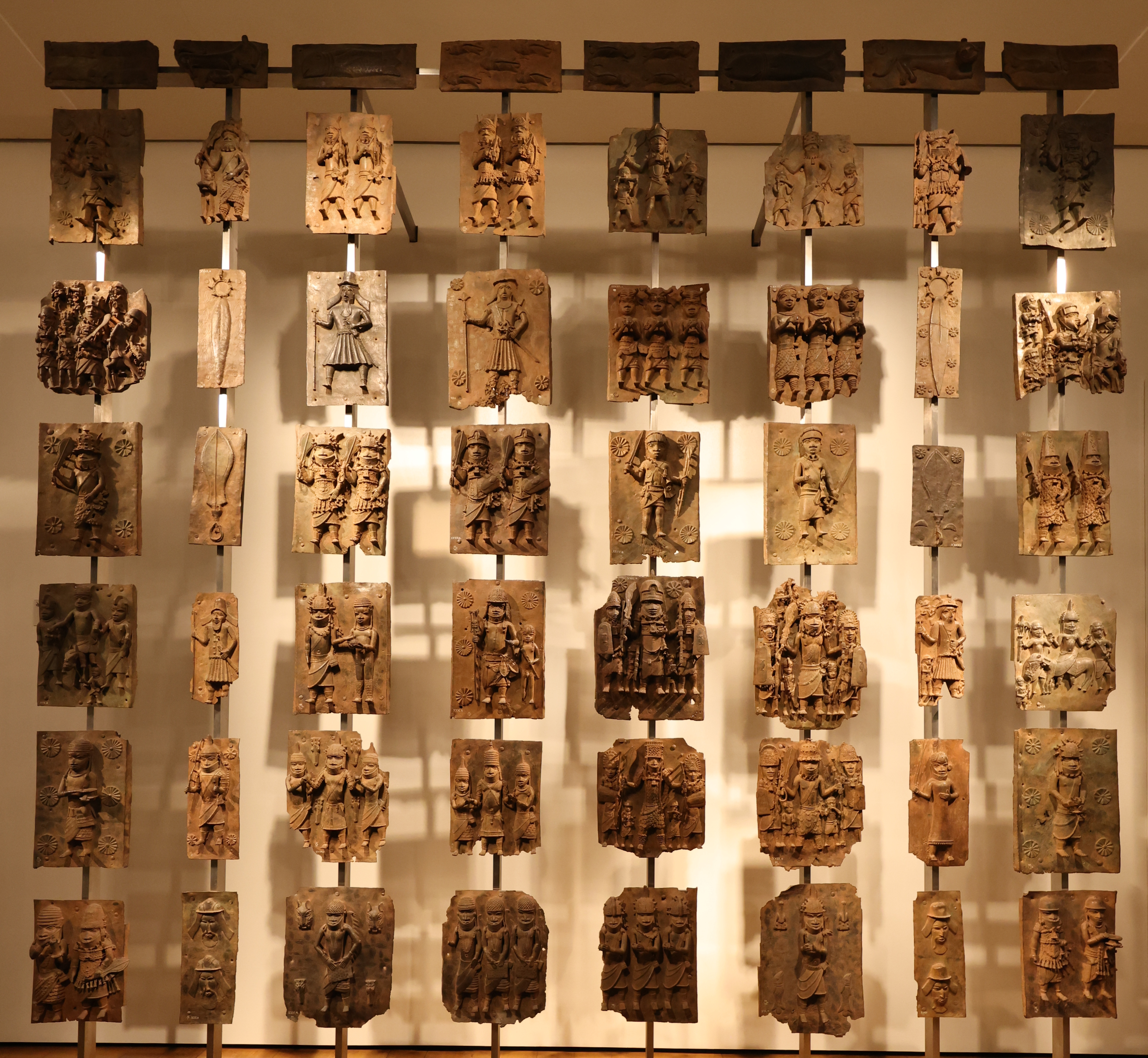
A display of Benin Bronzes at the British Museum

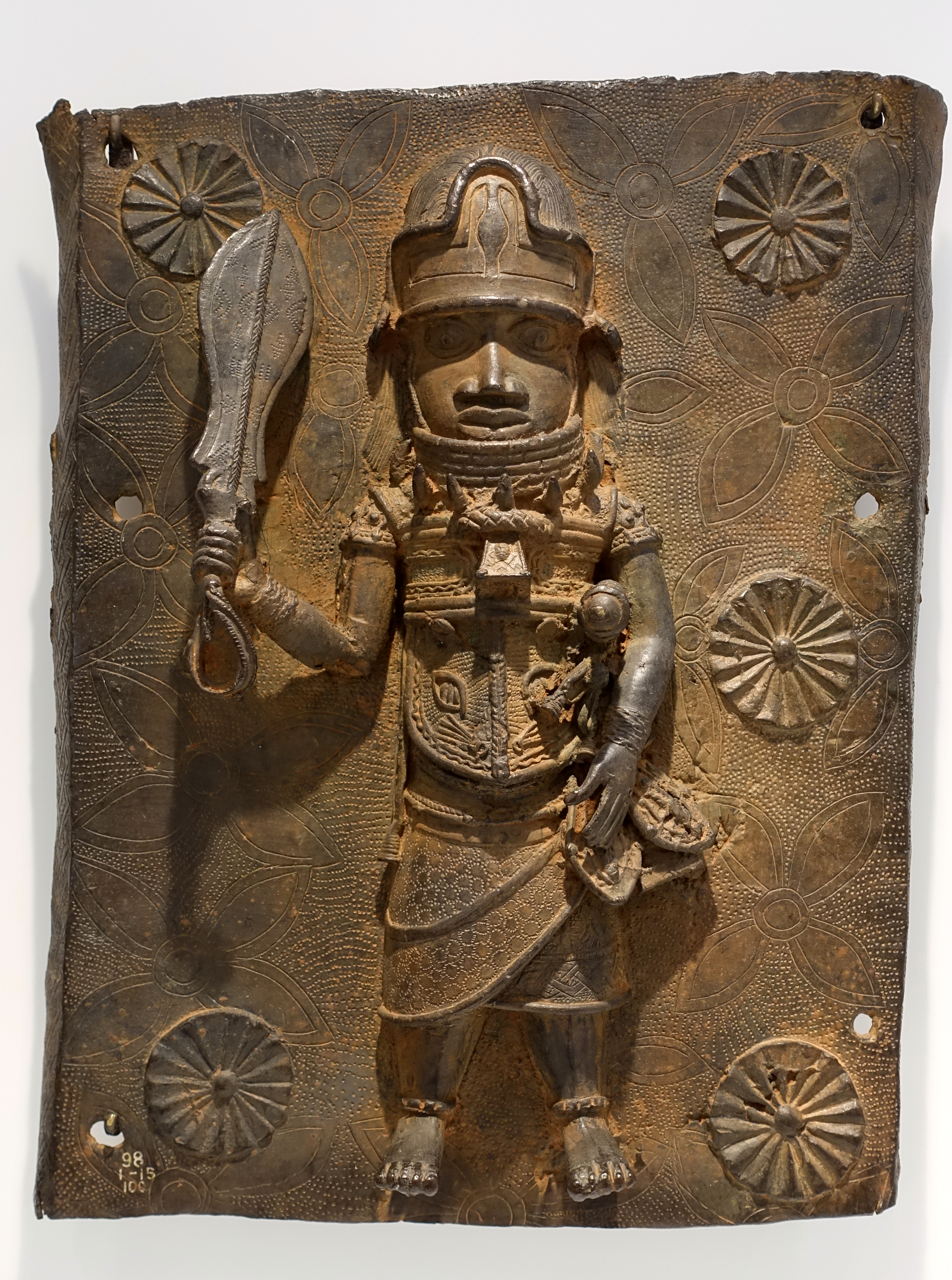
Single-figure plaque, mid-sixteenth to seventeenth century, cast copper alloy, Dallas Museum of Art

The Benin Bronzes that were part of the booty of the punitive expedition of 1897 had different destinations: one portion ended up in the private collections of various British officials; the Foreign and Commonwealth Office sold a large number, which later ended up in various European museums, mainly in Germany, and in American museums. The high quality of the pieces was reflected in the high prices they fetched on the market. The Foreign Office gave a large quantity of bronze wall plaques to the British Museum; these plaques illustrated the history of the Benin Kingdom in the fifteenth and sixteenth century.

The British Museum in London became home to the largest single holding approximately 900 objects while scores of other institutions in Germany, France, the Netherlands and the United States obtained significant troves.

== Subsequent sales, restitutions and repatriations ==
The two largest collections of Benin Bronzes are located in the Ethnological Museum of Berlin and in the British Museum in London, while the third largest collection is located in several museums in Nigeria (principally the Nigerian National Museum in Lagos).

Since gaining independence in 1960, Nigeria has sought the return of the bronzes on several occasions. There has been extensive debate over the location of the bronzes being distant from their place of origin. Their return has been considered a test case in the international debate over restitution of cultural objects from Africa, comparable to that of the Elgin Marbles, and have helped change attitudes towards repatriation.

Beginning in 1950, the British Museum sold more than 30 Benin Bronzes to the Nigerian government. At the time, the museum's curator, Hermann Braunholtz, declared that, although made individually, of the 203 plaques acquired by the museum in 1898, 30 were duplicates. Because they were identical representations, he determined that they were superfluous for the museum. The sales stopped in 1972, and the museum's African art specialist said that he regretted them.

In 1953, Sotheby's sold a Benin Bronze head for £5,500 when the previous record sale had been £780. In 1968, Christie's sold a Benin head that was discovered by a police officer in his neighbour's greenhouse for £21,000. In 1984, Sotheby's auctioned a plaque depicting a musician; its value was estimated at between £25,000 and £35,000 in the auction catalogue. In 2015, a Benin Bronze head was sold to a private collector for a record fee of £10 million.

On 23 March 2023, departing president Muhammadu Buhari declared by decree that all repatriated objects from the Benin Expedition, including those repatriated in the future, belong to the Benin Royal Family in Benin City, thereby converting the bronzes into private property. Oba Ewuare II subsequently announced plans to put the bronzes in a future museum on or near his palace grounds. As a result, the Museum of West African Art, (MOWAA) which had been chosen to display the bronzes and was partially funded by the German government, opened in 2024 with no bronzes in its collection. European journalists noted that conditions under which the German government had returned Benin Bronzes were ignored by Buhari. Swiss ethnologist Brigitta Hauser-Schäublin concluded that Germany's 2022 restitution policy was a "fiasco".

On 12 October 2025, The Guardian announced that in November of that year, the MOWAA will feature only clay reproductions of Benin bronzes within an artistic installation by Yinka Shonibare, rather than authentic pieces. This represents a significant departure from official 2020 announcements promising the institution would house the world's most extensive collection of these artifacts. As the Nigerian government had announced that the Oba of Benin holds legitimate ownership and custodial rights over the looted artifacts, they must remain within his Benin City residence unless the royal family determines an alternative arrangement. According to the MOWAA's director Phillip Ihenacho, one gallery will present findings from an archaeological excavation at the museum's location, funded with approximately £3 million from the British Museum. Another display will feature objects representing three thousand years of Nigerian and West African history. “Some of them may well be made of bronze,” Ihenacho was quoted. “But there will be nothing that was involved in the restitution process.”

=== Germany ===
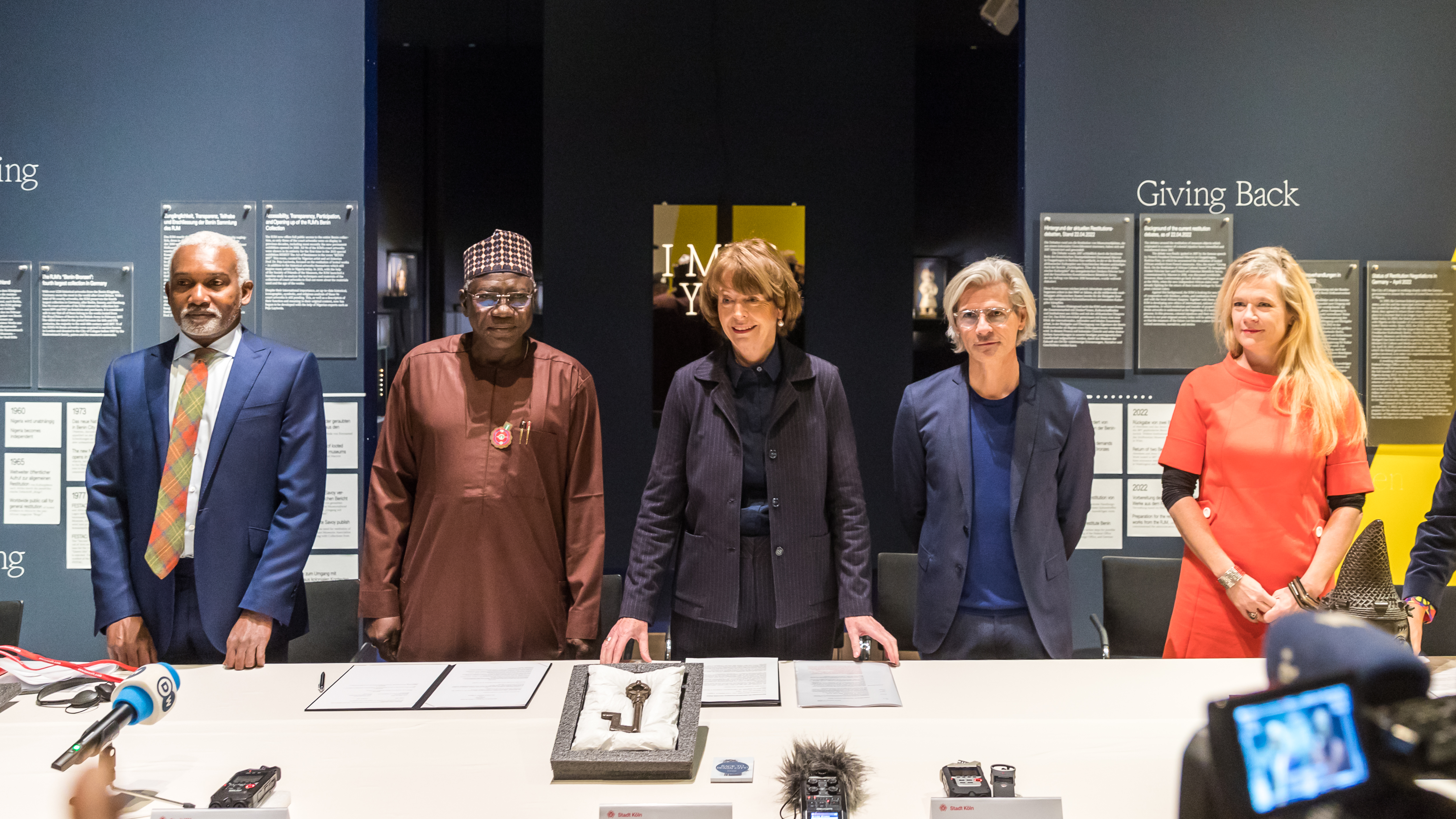
The signing of a 2022 agreement in Cologne, Germany, to transfer the Benin Bronzes of the city's museum to Nigeria

In April 2021, the German government declared the restitution of looted Benin Bronzes in Germany's public collections by 2022. Hartmut Dorgerloh, the director of the Humboldt Forum, which incorporates the Ethnological Museum of Berlin, said at a press event that a previous plan to exhibit the bronzes in a new museum complex in Berlin was "now not imaginable". Also in April 2021, the Church of England promised to return two Benin bronzes that were given as gifts to the then-Archbishop of Canterbury Robert Runcie in 1982. These bronzes were meant to join the collection of the future Benin Royal Museum. In the same month, the Horniman Museum in South London said it was considering legal advice in terms of repatriation and restitution of 49 works from Benin City, including 15 Benin Bronzes, in its possession.

In July 2022, Germany became the first European country to sign a joint political declaration to restitute 1,130 bronzes. That accord committed Germany to return artifacts and to support archaeological work and museum development in Nigeria. The physical transfers have proceeded in stages due to logistical and diplomatic complexities. On December 20, 2022, Germany formally handed over an initial batch of 20 bronzes in Abuja, with Germany’s Foreign Minister Annalena Baerbock stating this gesture acknowledged “the injustice of a colonial past”. In early 2023, several German cities including Berlin, Hamburg and Cologne transferred ownership rights of a wider collection, with display loans negotiated to maintain occasional European exhibitions.

In July 2022, Germany announced the immediate ownership transfer of 1,100 artefacts held by the Linden Museum in Stuttgart, the Humboldt Forum in Berlin, the Rautenstrauch-Joest Museum in Cologne, the Museum am Rothenbaum in Hamburg, and the State Ethnographic Collections of Saxony. The physical return of each item was negotiated between the German museums and the Nigerian government, with a "representative collection of objects" slated to remain in Germany on a long-term loan. On 28 November 2022, London's Horniman Museum held an official ceremony to unconditionally transfer ownership of its Benin Bronzes back to Nigeria.

=== The Netherlands ===
Nigeria received 119 bronzes from the Netherlands after a series of meetings between both governments. This return of the Benin Bronzes is part of the plan by the government of the Netherlands for cultural restitution and historical justice. In February 2025, Nigeria and the Netherlands concluded an agreement for the return of 119 bronzes housed in Leiden's collections, marking the largest single restitution to date. The handover ceremony in Edo State featured Oba Ewuare II, who celebrated the return as a “divine intervention” in restoring cultural sovereignty. The handover ceremony took place on the 21st of June 2025, with the Minister for Arts, Culture, and the Creative Economy; the Director General of the National Commission for Museums and Monuments; Benin Chiefs; and other cultural and heritage professionals in Nigeria.
The repatriated Benin Bronzes will be taken to Benin City to be received by the Oba of Benin and then kept in a gallery that will be made available following a partnership between the museum commission and Coronation Group.

On 19 June 2025, the Dutch government returned a group of 113 bronzes from its national collection and another six from the collection of the city of Rotterdam, "the single largest return of Benin antiquities directly linked to the 1897 British punitive expedition" to date.

=== United Kingdom ===
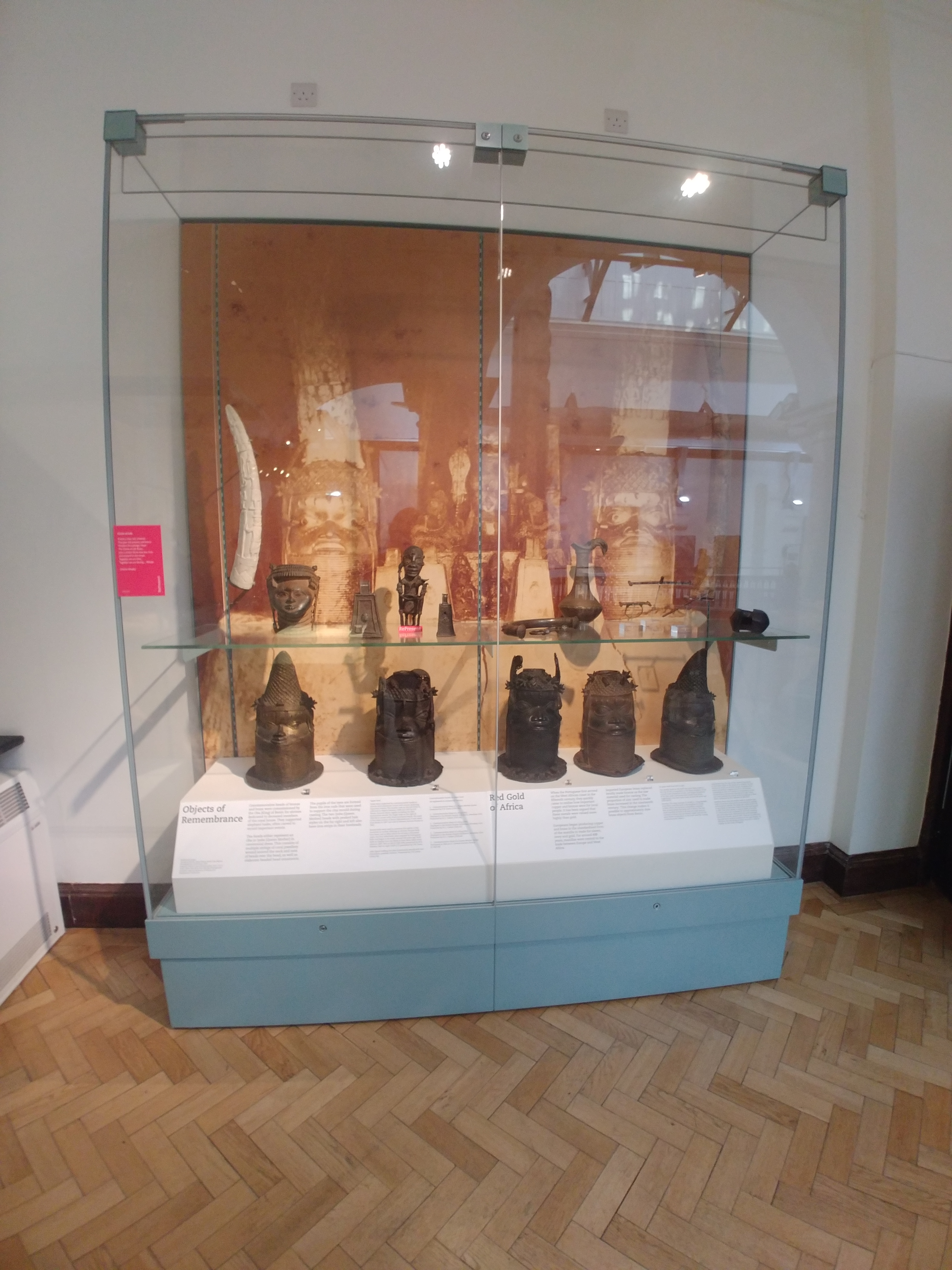
Display of Benin bronzes at Museum of Archaeology & Anthropology, Cambridge, March 2022

British institutions have moved more cautiously. In response to the British Museum's continued refusal to return looted Benin bronzes, the Iyase (traditional prime minister) of the Benin Kingdom unveiled the largest bronze plaque to date on 30 July 2021. The plaque contains over 2 tons of brass and was created by one of the grandsons of Iyase Lukas Osarobo Zeickner-Okoro. It is titled The Return of Oba Ewuare to symbolise the Benin belief in reincarnation and a restart of the Benin Bronze Age in the reign of Oba Ewuare II. The piece was offered to the British Museum in exchange for the bronzes held there.

The Horniman Museum in London became the first UK museum to return bronzes in November 2022. Negotiations continue with the British Museum, whose collection of around 900 objects remains protected by an act of Parliament. Cambridge University’s Museum of Archaeology and Anthropology has also faced pressure to repatriate more than 100 items; those discussions are ongoing as of early 2025.

In 2018, an agreement was made between the Benin Dialogue Group and the British government to return Benin Bronzes in order to form a temporary exhibition at a new Benin Royal Museum in Edo State. The group comprises representatives of several international museums, the Royal Court of Benin, the Edo State government, and the Nigerian National Commission for Museums and Monuments (NCMM). In 2015, Mark Walker returned some Benin Bronzes that were taken by his grandfather during the siege on Benin Kingdom; he was received by Prince Edun Akenzua in Benin City. The University of Aberdeen agreed in March 2021 to return a bronze head of an oba that had been purchased at an auction in 1957. The return was completed at a handover ceremony held on 28 October 2021.

In October 2021, Jesus College, Cambridge, announced that it would repatriate a sculpture of a cockerel, known as Okukor, to Nigeria after the student body brought to light its historical significance as a looted artefact. The statue had been removed from display in 2016 after calls for its repatriation; following an investigation by the college's Legacy of Slavery Working Party, it was ascertained that the statue had been taken directly from the court of Benin before being gifted to the college by the father of a student in 1905. In February 2022, Okukor and the bronze returned by the University of Aberdeen were received at the royal palace in Benin City by the oba of Benin, Ewuare II. In December 2022, the University of Cambridge legally transferred ownership of more than 100 Benin artefacts from its Museum of Archaeology and Anthropology to the NCMM. A museum spokesperson declared that some of the pieces were to remain in Cambridge "on extended loan" to ensure that "this west African civilisation continues to be represented in the museum's displays, and in teaching for school groups". As of February 2025, the statues have yet to be sent to Nigeria.

In January 2022, the Great North Museum: Hancock in Newcastle agreed to return a Benin Bronze stave to Nigeria.

The Royal Collection has a mid 17th-century Bronze head of an Oba that was presented to Queen Elizabeth II by General Yakubu Gowon, the Head of State of Nigeria during the military dictatorship in Nigeria during his 1973 State Visit to the United Kingdom. It was believed to be a modern replica until it was declared to be authentic in 2002. The head had been taken by Gowon from the National Museum in Lagos prior to his visit.

=== United States ===
In November 2021, the Metropolitan Museum of Art transferred two sixteenth-century Bronze plaques, Warrior Chief and Junior Court Official, to the NCMM. The plaques had previously been held by the British Museum and the National Museum Lagos before entering the international art market under unclear circumstances and eventually being donated to the Met in 1991. After conducting provenance research in collaboration with the British Museum, the Met deaccessioned the works and arranged their return. The museum retains approximately 160 additional objects from Benin City in its collection, many of which were acquired through donations from private collectors who had purchased them on the art market in the late twentieth century. Historian and journalist Barnaby Phillips, who has researched the history of the bronzes, argued that the Met had long been aware of concerns about the objects’ provenance and only recently initiated an investigation. He suggested that the museum chose to return the plaques because they had been illegally removed from a Nigerian museum after the country’s independence in 1960, rather than because of their earlier colonial-era looting. The decision was therefore driven primarily by legal considerations under the 1970 UNESCO Convention, which calls for the return of cultural property stolen from museums or public monuments, rather than by broader ethical claims for repatriation.

In March 2022, the Smithsonian Institution announced that 39 bronzes would be repatriated, intended for display at the future National Museum of Benin City. The Smithsonian Institution's National Museum of African Art signed over ownership of 29 Benin bronzes to the NCMM on 11 October 2022, with Nigerian leaders and cultural officials in attendance; at the same time, the National Gallery of Art returned one Benin bronze.

=== Switzerland ===
In March 2026, the Benin Initiative Switzerland (BIS) committed to returning Benin bronzes and cultural artifacts from three museums to Nigeria. The three Swiss museums, the University of Zurich's Ethnographic Museum, the Rietberg Museum, and the Musée d'ethnographie de Genève, signed agreements to transfer ownership of 28 Benin artifacts to Nigeria. Fourteen objects from the University of Zurich are to be returned to the Nigerian National Museum in Lagos, while some pieces from the Rietberg Museum will remain in Switzerland as long-term loans at Nigeria's request. "The Nigerian side was very interested in the idea that the history and the artistry of Benin would still be told in Switzerland," Rietberg director Annette Bhagwati told The Art Newspaper.

=== Opposition ===
In August 2022, the Restitution Study Group, an African-American slavery reparations activist organization, petitioned against British repatriation of Benin Bronzes. The group argued that in the past, African people had been complicit in selling captives into the Atlantic slave trade and suggested that descendants of enslaved Africans should have co-ownership over the Benin Bronzes in Western museums. The group filed a petition to prevent the Smithsonian Institution's repatriation in 2022, arguing that the bronzes were linked to the descendants of enslaved people in America because they were made with metal ingots traded for African slaves and that removing the bronzes would deny Americans the opportunity to experience their heritage. The petition was denied, and subsequent appeals as high as the Supreme Court failed to overturn the verdict.

=== Digital Benin online platform ===
In November 2022, the Digital Benin online database was launched with support from a number of African and Western museums. Digital Benin lists over 130 institutions in 20 countries with Benin cultural heritage in their collections. The site displays information about the specifications, location, and provenance of more than 5,000 artefacts, including maps, high-resolution images, and titles of the works in English and Edo.

== The works ==
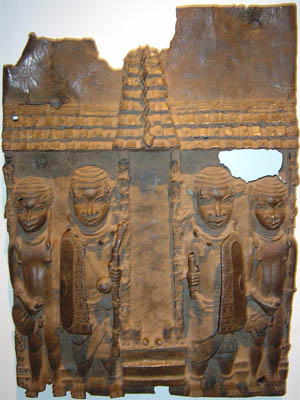
A Benin Bronze depicting the palace of the Oba of Benin- British Museum

The Benin Bronzes are more naturalistic than most African art of the period. The bronze surfaces are designed to highlight contrasts between light and metal. The features of many of the heads are exaggerated from natural proportions, with large ears, noses, and lips, which are shaped with great care. The most notable aspect of the works is the high level of metal working skill at lost-wax casting. The descendants of these artisans still revere Igue-Igha, as the person who introduced the art of casting to the Kingdom of Benin.

Another important aspect of the works is their exclusivity: property was reserved only for certain social classes, reflecting the strict hierarchical structure of society in the Kingdom of Benin. In general, only the king could own objects made of bronze and ivory, however, he could allow high-ranking individuals to use such items, such as hanging masks and cuffs made of bronze and ivory. Coral was also a royal material. Coral neck rings were a symbol of nobility and use was granted specifically by the oba.

=== Themes ===
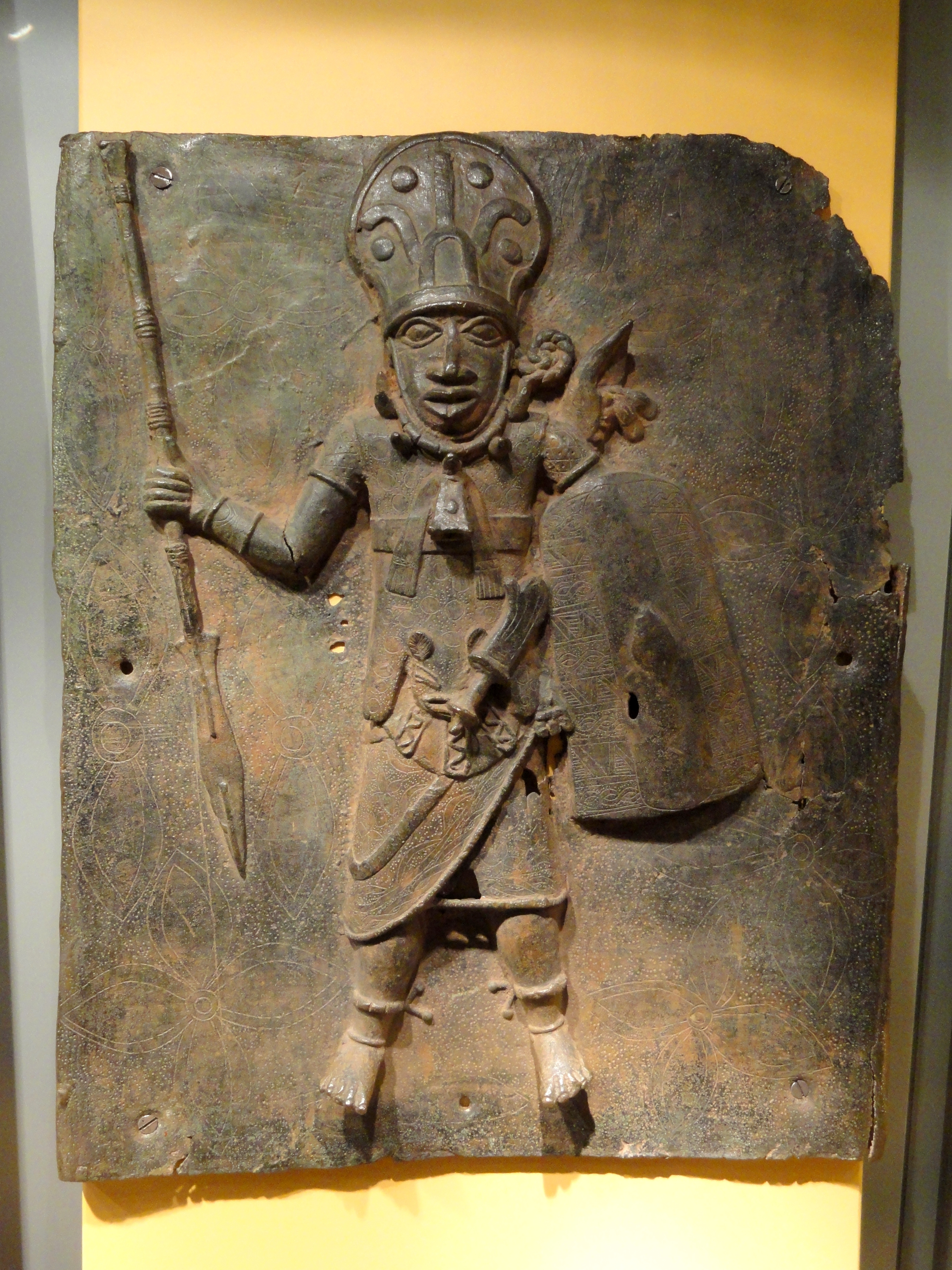
Benin Bronze in the Staatliches Museum für Völkerkunde München depicting a warrior or noble

The rectangular plaques exist in two formats. In one, the long vertical sides are turned back, creating a small edge that is decorated with an incised guilloché pattern. In the other format, which is much narrower, the turned-back edges are missing and the design of the plaque background ends abruptly, as if cut off. These variations probably reflect the size and shape of the palace pillars and the arrangement of the plaques on them. The plaques are generally about 1/8 inch (3.2 mm) thick.

The backgrounds on the front of most of the plaques are incised with foliate patterns bearing one to four leaves, which is referred to as ebe-ame, or the "river leaf" design. The leaves were used in healing rites by priestesses of Olokun, the god of the sea.

Some of the reliefs represent important battles of the sixteenth-century wars of expansion; however, the majority depict dignitaries wearing ceremonial dress. Most of the plaques portray static figures, either alone, in pairs, or in small groups arranged hierarchically around a central figure. Many of the figures depicted in the plaques may be identified only through their clothing and emblems, which indicated their rank and function in the court, but not their individual identities. Although there have been attempts to link some of the depictions with historical figures, these identifications have been speculative and unverified. In certain cases, the lack of information even extends to the functional roles of some figures, which cannot conclusively be determined.

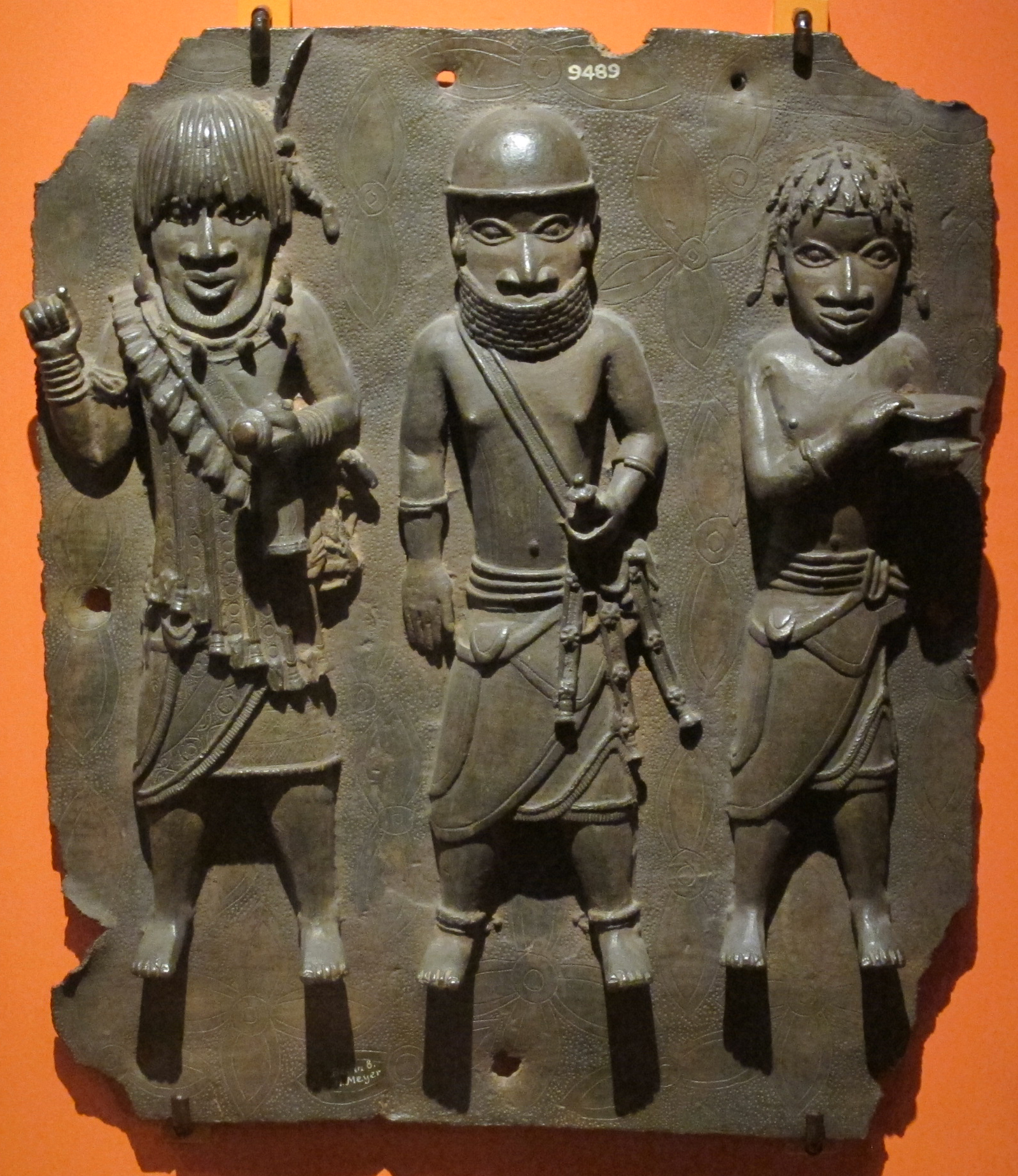
A Benin Bronze depicting three Benin warriors

The bronze heads were reserved for ancestral altars. They were also used as a base for engraved elephant tusks, which were placed in openings in the heads. The commemorative heads of the king or the queen mother were not individual portraits, although they show a stylized naturalism. Instead, they are archetypical depictions; the style of their design changed over the centuries, which also occurred with the insignia of the depicted royalty. The elephant tusks with decorative carvings, which may have begun being used as a decorative element in the eighteenth century, show distinct scenes from the reign of a deceased king.

As a prerequisite for royal succession, each new oba had to install an altar in honor of his predecessor. According to popular belief, a person's head was the receptacle of the supernatural guide for rational behavior. The head of an oba was especially sacred, since the survival, security, and prosperity of all Edo citizens and their families, depended on his wisdom. In the annual festivals to reinforce the mystical power of the oba, the new king made ritual offerings in these sanctuaries, which were considered essential for the continuation of his reign. The stylistic variation of these bronze heads is such an important characteristic of Beninese art that it constitutes the primary scientific basis for establishing a chronology.

The leopard is a motif that occurs throughout many of the Benin Bronzes, because it is the animal which symbolizes the oba. Another recurring motif is the royal triad: the oba in the centre, flanked by two assistants, highlighting the support of those who the king trusted in order to govern.

According to some sources, the Benin artists may have been inspired by items brought during the arrival of the Portuguese, including European illuminated books, small ivory caskets with carved lids from India, and Indian miniature paintings. The quatrefoil "river leaves" might have originated from European or Islamic art, but by contrast, Babatunde Lawal cites examples of relief carving in southern Nigerian art to support his theory that the plaques are indigenous to Benin.

British archaeologist and anthropologist Dan Hicks discussed the looting of the Benin Bronzes and their current presence within museums around the world. In his book he expressed the view that the looting of the Benin Bronzes are not an 'historical incident of reception' but an 'enduring brutality'. It was also noted that a total figure of looted artefacts from Benin was up to 10,000 bronzes, ivories and other objects. Hicks notes that many of the looted Benin artefacts are in regional and university museums within the UK rather than the more well-known collections such as the British Museum, Royal Collection and the Victoria and Albert Museum.

== Influence on contemporary African art ==
A collection of artefacts stolen from the kingdom of Benin in 1897, had a huge and great impact on the African art. The artefacts are known for their intricate craftsmanship and historical significance.

Their impact extends above aesthetics, cultural heritage and the representation of African artefacts at large.

=== Technique ===
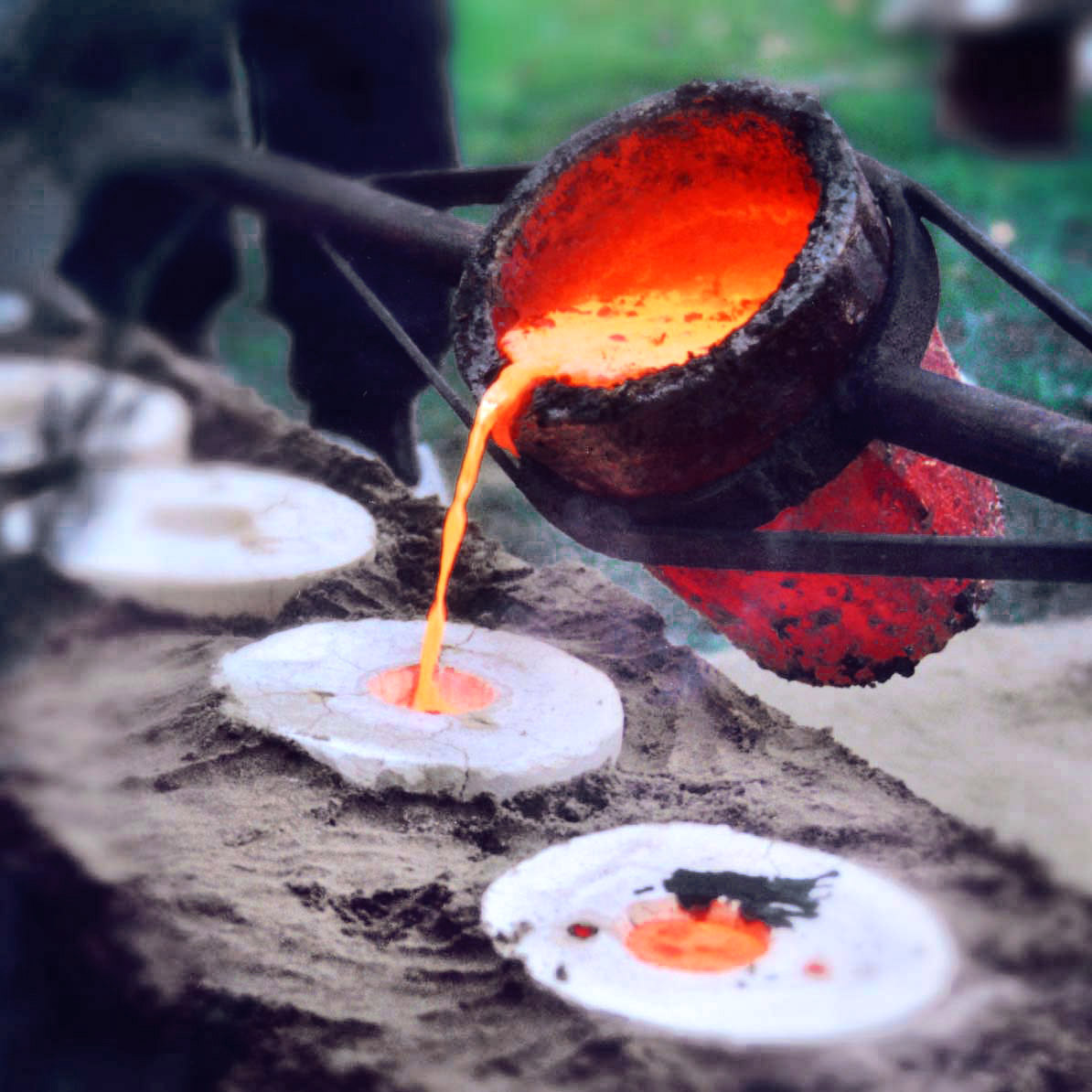
Bronze casting using the lost wax method. The molten metal is poured into the mould.

Although the works generally are called the Benin Bronzes, they are made of different materials. Many are made of Brass, which analysis has shown to be an alloy of copper, zinc and lead in various proportions. Others are non-metallic, made of wood, ceramic, ivory, leather or cloth.

The wooden objects are made in a complex process. It starts with a tree trunk or branch and is carved directly. The artist obtains the final form of the work from a block of wood. Since it was customary to use freshly cut wood in carvings, once the piece was finalized the surface was charred to prevent cracking during drying. This also allowed for polychromatic artworks, which were achieved using knife cuts and applications of natural pigments made with vegetable oil or palm oil. This type of grease, which was made near smoke from homes, allowed the wooden sculptures to acquire a patina that resembles rusty metal.

The figures depicted in the bronzes were cast in relief with details incised in the wax model. Artists working in bronze were organized into a type of guild under royal decree and lived in a special area of the palace under the direct control of the oba. The works made using lost-wax casting required great specialisation. Their quality was superior when the king was especially powerful, allowing him to employ a great number of specialists.

Although the oldest examples of similar Benin metal work in bronze date from the twelfth century, according to tradition, the lost-wax casting technique was introduced to Benin by the son of the Oni, or sovereign of Ife. Their tradition holds that he taught the Benin metal workers the art of casting bronze using lost-wax techniques during the thirteenth century. These Benin artisans refined that technique until they were able to cast plaques only an eighth-of-an-inch (3 mm) thick, surpassing the art as practiced by Renaissance masters in Europe.

== Reception ==
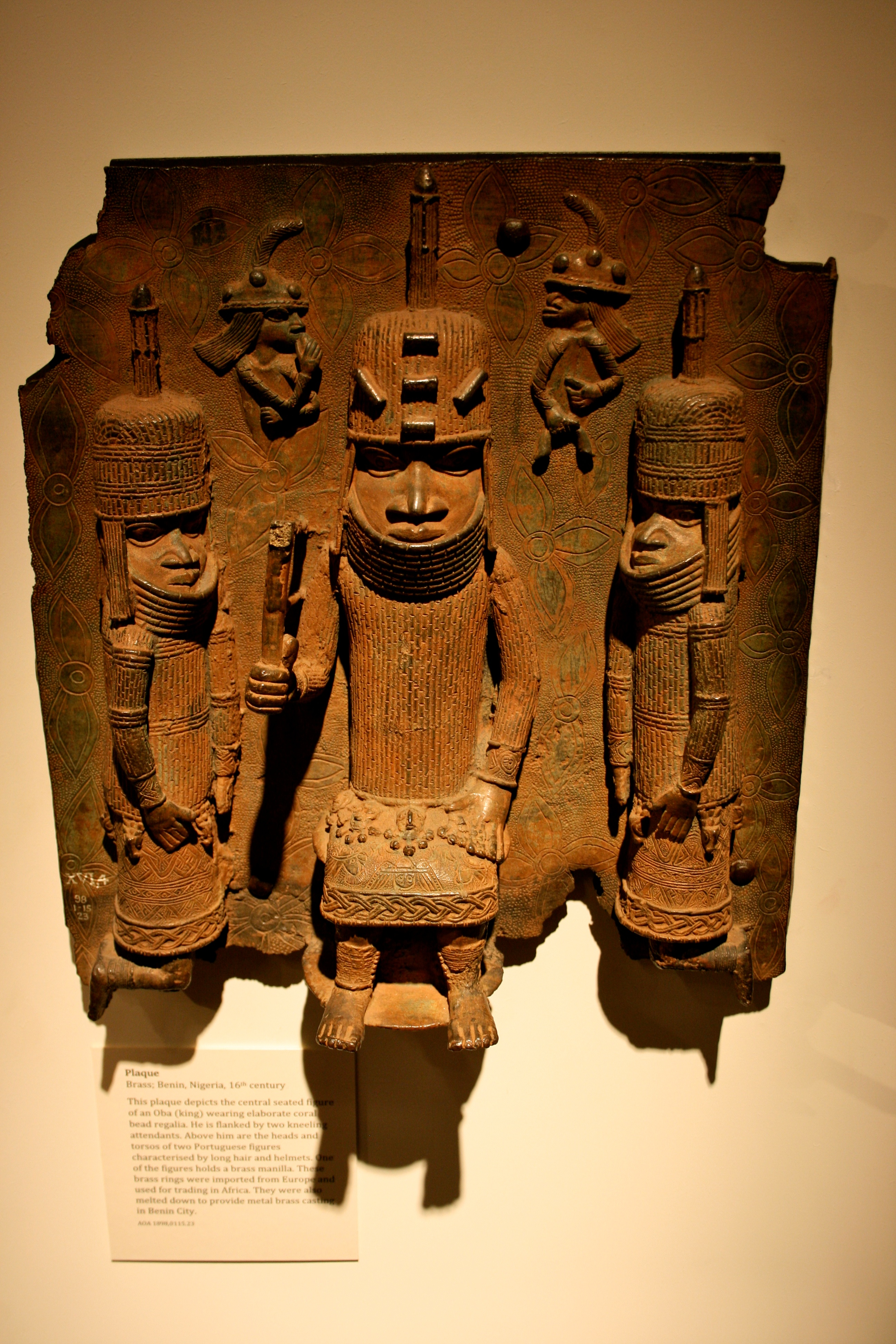
16th-century brass plaque, depicting an oba, two kneeling attendants, and two Portuguese figures, British Museum

One sixteenth-century bronze, depicting the Oba with Europeans, was featured in A History of the World in 100 Objects, a series of radio programmes that started in 2010 as a collaboration between the BBC and the British Museum; it was also published as a book.

== See also ==
- Art of the Kingdom of Benin
- Conservation and restoration of cultural property – Process of protecting cultural property
- Looted art – Art that was taken illicitly
- Museum of West African Art – Museum in Benin City, Edo State, Nigeria
- Okukor – Historical bronze statue from Benin City in Nigeria, formerly at Jesus College, Cambridge
- Report on the restitution of African cultural heritage

== Bibliography ==
- Beretta, Alcides; Rodenas, María Dolores (1983). Historia del Arte: La escultura del África negra (in Spanish). Vol. II. Barcelona: Carroggio. ISBN 978-84-7254-313-3.
- Docherty, Paddy (2021). Blood and Bronze: The British Empire and the Sack of Benin. London: Hurst. ISBN 978-1-787-38456-9.
- Dohlvik, Charlotta (May 2006). Museums and Their Voices: A Contemporary Study of the Benin Bronzes (PDF). International Museum Studies. Archived from the original (PDF) on 19 October 2013.
- Gowing, Lawrence, ed. (1984). Historia Universal del Arte (in Spanish). Vol. IV. Madrid: SARPE. ISBN 978-84-7291-592-3.
- Greenfield, Janette (2007). The Return of Cultural Treasures. Cambridge University Press. ISBN 978-0-521-80216-1.
- Hicks, Dan (2020). The Brutish Museums. The Benin Bronzes, Colonial Violence and Cultural Restitution. Pluto Press. ISBN 978-0-7453-4176-7.
- Huera, Carmen (1988). Historia Universal del Arte: África, América y Asia, Arte Primitivo. Barcelona: Planeta. ISBN 978-84-320-6690-0.
- Leuzinger, Elsy (1976). Arte del África negra (in Spanish). Barcelona: Ediciones Polígrafa. ISBN 978-84-343-0176-4.
- Lundén, Staffan (2016). Displaying Loot. The Benin objects and the British Museum. Gotark Series B, Göteborgs Universitet.
- Nevadomsky, Joseph (Spring 2004). "Art and Science in Benin Bronzes". African Arts. 37 (1): 1, 4, 86–88, 95–96. doi:10.1162/afar.2004.37.1.1. JSTOR 3338001.
- Nevadomsky, Joseph (2005). "Casting in Contemporary Benin Art". African Arts. 38 (2): 66–96. doi:10.1162/afar.2005.38.2.66.
- Phillips, Barnaby (2022). LOOT: Britain and the Benin Bronzes. Oneworld Publications. ISBN 978-0-86154-313-7.
- Pijoan (1966). Pijoan-Historia del Arte. Vol. I. Barcelona: Salvat Editores.
- Titi, Catharine (2023). The Parthenon Marbles and International Law. Springer. ISBN 978-3-031-26356-9.
- Willett, Frank (1985). African Art: An Introduction (Reprint. ed.). New York: Thames and Hudson. ISBN 978-0-500-20103-9.
- Benin Diplomatic Handbook. International Business Publications. 2005. ISBN 978-0-7397-5745-1.

Preceded by 76: Mechanical Galleon	A History of the World in 100 Objects; Object 77	Succeeded by 78: Double-headed serpent
