= Bronze head of an Oba (Royal Collection) =

A Benin Bronze head of an Oba dating to c.1650 is in the Royal Collection of the British royal family. It was given to Queen Elizabeth II by General Yakubu Gowon, the Head of State of Nigeria during the military dictatorship in Nigeria during his 1973 state visit to the United Kingdom. It was believed to be a modern replica until it was declared to be authentic in 2002.

== Description ==
It is made from bronze and iron and measures 30.0 x 24.0 x 24.0 cm. The head wears regalia made from coral, a sign of the importance of coral to portray wealth and influence. A circular hole at the top of the head would have held an ivory tusk inscribed with events from the Oba's reign. It is believed to date to the 1650s.

== Royal Collection ==
It is displayed in the Grand Vestibule of Windsor Castle. In 2002 it was displayed at Buckingham Palace as part of exhibition of gifts to the Queen by heads of state. It was given to Queen Elizabeth II by General Yakubu Gowon, the Head of State of Nigeria during the military dictatorship in Nigeria during his state visit to the United Kingdom from June 12-15 1973. The authenticity of the head was established in 2002. It had previously believed to have been a modern replica.

== History ==
The head has been dated to c.1650. It was taken from the palace of the Benin Oba during the punitive Benin Expedition in 1897, most likely by a British army officer. It was sold between 1946 and 1957 to the Nigerian National Museum. The British Colonial Office helped purchase bronzes for the new national museum.

=== 1973 appropriation ===
In 1973 General Yakubu Gowon took the head from the National Museum in Lagos before his state visit to the United Kingdom in June 1973. Gowon then gave the head as a diplomatic gift to Elizabeth II. In the spring of 1973 Gowon had telephoned the director of the National Museum, Ekpo Eyo, at home to tell him to bring a bronze head of a king to Gowon's presidential office. Eyo was horrified at the request and decided to take an alternative gift of a Yoruba mask, which although artistically important was one of several in the museum's holdings. Eyo told General Gowon of the importance of the head the next day at a meeting and of its purchase for the National Museum. Gowon was unpersuaded by Eyo's argument and gave the head "out of love for The Queen" but "out of ignorance" according to Eyo. Eyo wrote to the British Museum's Keeper of Ethnography, William Fagg, following the state visit to ask him to persuade Elizabeth to return the head. Eyo had assumed that Fagg would have been contacted to evaluate the head but he had not been. Prior to his visit Nigerian government officials had told royal staff that he intended to present Elizabeth with a modern replica of a Benin bronze as thanks for British support during the Biafra War. Gowon had asked one of his regional military governors to commission such a piece but was dissatisfied with the finished work. Gowon's exchange with Eyo were recalled in a September 2002 article in The Art Newspaper by Professor John Picton who had been the deputy director of the antiquities department at the Lagos Museum at the time.

In 2005 declassified material from the Foreign and Commonwealth Office revealed that the British government knew in 1974 that the head had been taken from the National Museum. The West African art specialist Michael Glaze wrote to the UK High Commission in Lagos in December 1974 to suggest that Elizabeth reciprocate Gowon's gift by giving him two ivory leopards which had been acquired by Queen Victoria. The potential gift of the leopards had been a proposed by the Foreign Office. Glaze wrote of Gowon's gift that "It was in the Lagos Museum up to a few days before Gowon left for the UK when, realising he had to come bearing a suitable gift, he sent to the museum and said, 'I'll have that one'". In 1974 it was estimated to be worth £30,000 (equivalent to £284,423 in 2025).

=== 2002 revelation of authenticity ===
The head was displayed publicly for the first time in Britain in September 2002 when it went on display in Windsor Castle in an exhibition of gifts given to the Queen by foreign states. An art expert from the Art Newspaper saw the head and believed it was authentic. He then consulted Piction and the British Museum expert Nigel Barley with the approval of the royal household. Barley and Piction confirmed the authenticity of the head. Frances Dinnkels of the Royal Collection said that there had been no approaches from the Nigerian government to return the head and that it had been presented as a "modern copy and there was no reason to doubt that. It was a state gift" and that she "[did not] think that one can form an opinion" on the moral obligation for its return to Nigeria. The issue of the head has been seen as weakening Nigeria's stance on the repatriation of Benin bronzes.
