= Museum of West African Art =

Museum in Benin City, Edo State, Nigeria

Museum of West African Art (MOWAA)
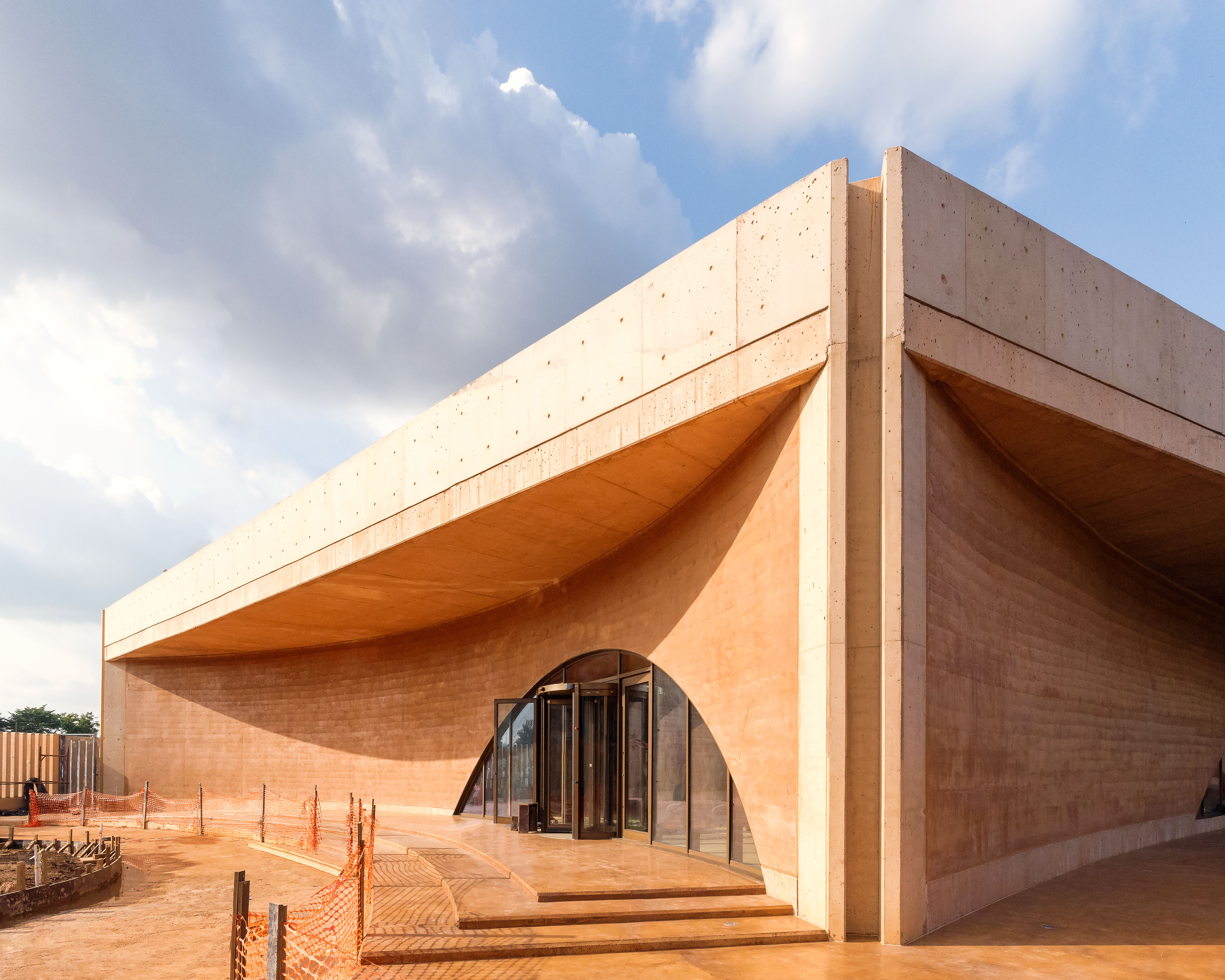
- MOWAA during construction in June 2025
- Established: 2020
- Location: Benin City, Nigeria
- Coordinates: 6°19′45″N 5°37′22″E
- Architect: David Adjaye
- Website: https://wearemowaa.org

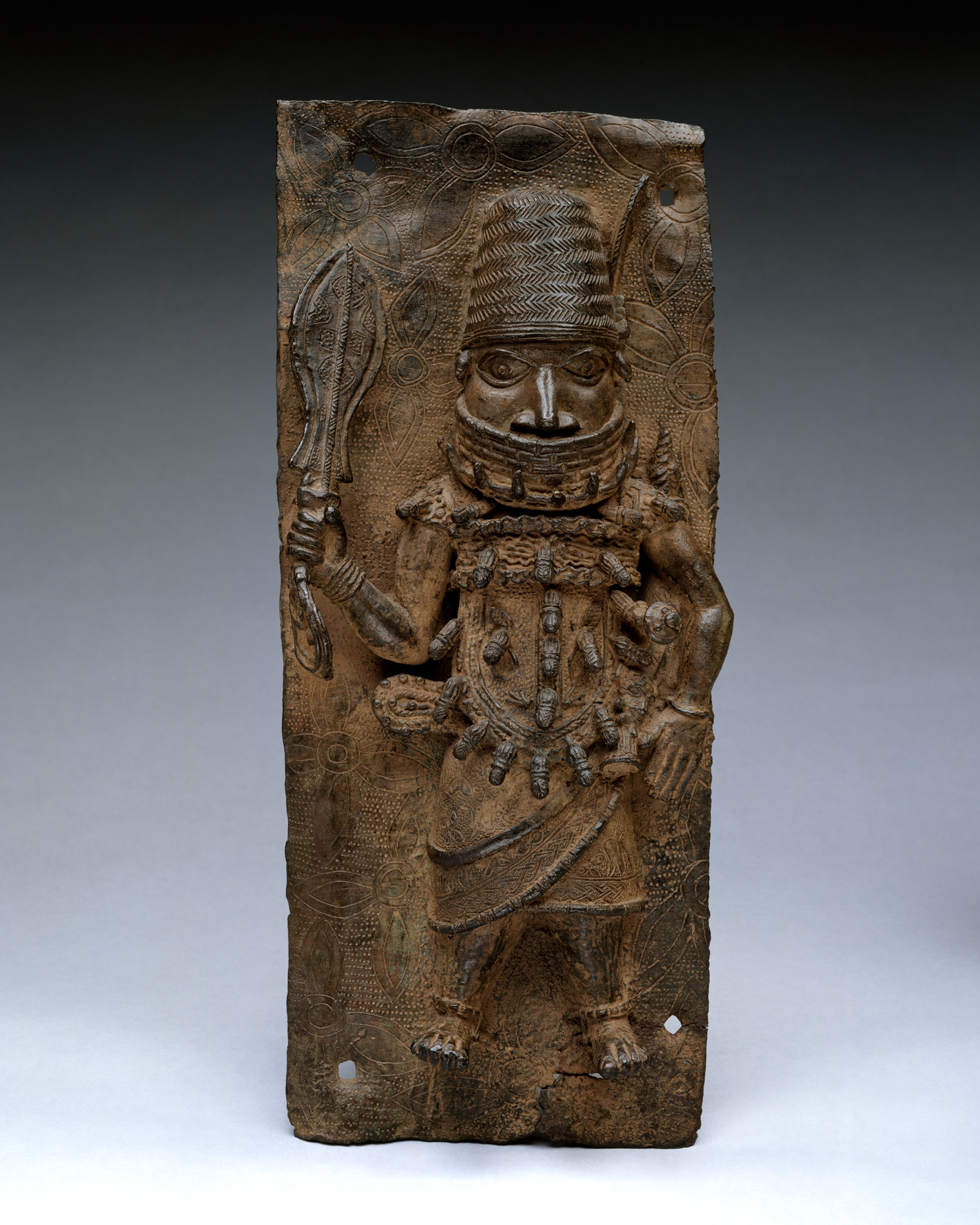
Warrior Chief, initially one of the Benin Bronzes to be shown in the new museum, before they were all being handed over to Oba Ewuare II in 2023.

The Museum of West African Art (MOWAA) is a museum that has been built in Benin City, Nigeria and was planned to open on 11 November 2025. However, due to political protests during opening ceremony, the museum remains closed until further notice. It will show over 300 items on loan from European museums. Its architect, David Adjaye, revealed renderings for the museum in November 2020. The campus is 15 acres large, and construction cost is estimated to be US$25 million (36.2 Billion Nigerian Naira) so far. More costs and funding are expected to appear upon opening.

== Background ==
=== Museum importance ===
African art has historically been researched within the anthropological field, rather than the art historical field. Because of this anthropological influence, along with the primitivization of African people, African art tends to be displayed within an ethnological context, rather than an art context. This museum will mainly focus on the display of contemporary West African art, allowing for the art it contains to occupy the space of contemporary art that it deserves.

=== Benin Bronzes ===
Thousands of Benin Bronzes, artwork and artifacts, some dating back to the 15th century, were looted from the Benin Kingdom by British soldiers in the 19th Century. Many of these items subsequently made their way onto displays and collections at prominent museums and institutions worldwide, particularly in Europe and America.

The Museum of West African Art was originally intended to display these Benin Bronzes, but none of them are shown and none of them are in the museums depot. The Bronzes were given to Oba Ewuare II by president Muhammadu Buhari in 2023 before the museum was built.

Only clay replicas of some Benin Bronzes are shown as part of an installation by artist Yinka Shonibare in the museum's inaugural exhibition.

=== Delayed opening and repatriation controversy ===
As of Late November 2025, there was dispute among several parties (including federal and state governments as well as the local community) over control and rightful ownership of the repatriated artifacts. The governor of Edo, Nigeria, Monday Okpebholo, revoked the "Certificate of Occupancy for the land on which Mowaa is located, citing 'overriding public interest' and doubts about the museum’s ownership and governance."

On 9 November 2025, protests were reported at the museum during preview events ahead of the formal opening. This led the previews to be curtailed and the museum issuing a statement about the protests. Followers of Oba Ewuare II attacked the private preview ceremony with observers concluding that after the Benin Bronzes were already locked away in his private palace, the Oba would now seek control over the new museum itself to use it for some form of traditionalistic self-presentation. The Oba had claimed he conceived the museum to be the Benin Royal Museum under his custodianship and not the "Museum of West African Art". According to him, the renaming happened without his consent.

"Phillip Ihenacho, MOWAA’s director and executive chair, told The Art Newspaper: 'We have been caught up in a complex local situation. There are misperceptions about what we are and what we are not. Yes, we started during the discussions of restitution of Benin Bronzes, but fairly quickly afterwards, from 2021 onwards, we have tried to make it clear that we are not a receptacle for the Benin Bronzes. We do not have an entitlement to Benin Bronzes, and we are not trying to compete with other museums established in Benin. Our strong belief is that Benin City needs multiple points of interest from multiple museums.'"

Journalist Geraldine Kendall Adams commented in November 2025, that there was concern among Nigeria’s cultural commentators that the political row over the future of the museum could damage the country’s reputation and set back efforts to repatriate the Benin bronzes and other cultural artefacts.

== Sources ==
- https://www.apollo-magazine.com/museum-west-african-art-mowaa-benin-city-nigeria/
- https://www.artnews.com/art-news/news/nigerias-museum-of-west-african-art-encyclopedic-museums-preview-1234696892/
- https://www.theartnewspaper.com/2024/11/01/benin-city-museum-opens-first-part-of-planned-campus

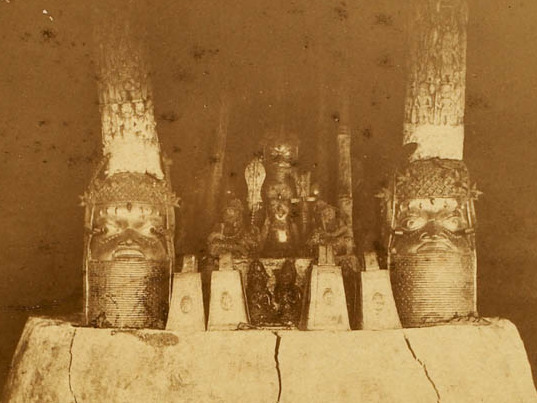
Original location of Benin Bronzes in Nigerian Royal Palace, 1891
