= Meals on Wheels Association of America =

Nutrition charity

Meals on Wheels America
- Company type: Non-Profit
- Headquarters: Arlington, Virginia, United States
- Area served: United States
- Key people: Ellie Hollander, President and CEO
- Website: www.mealsonwheelsamerica.org

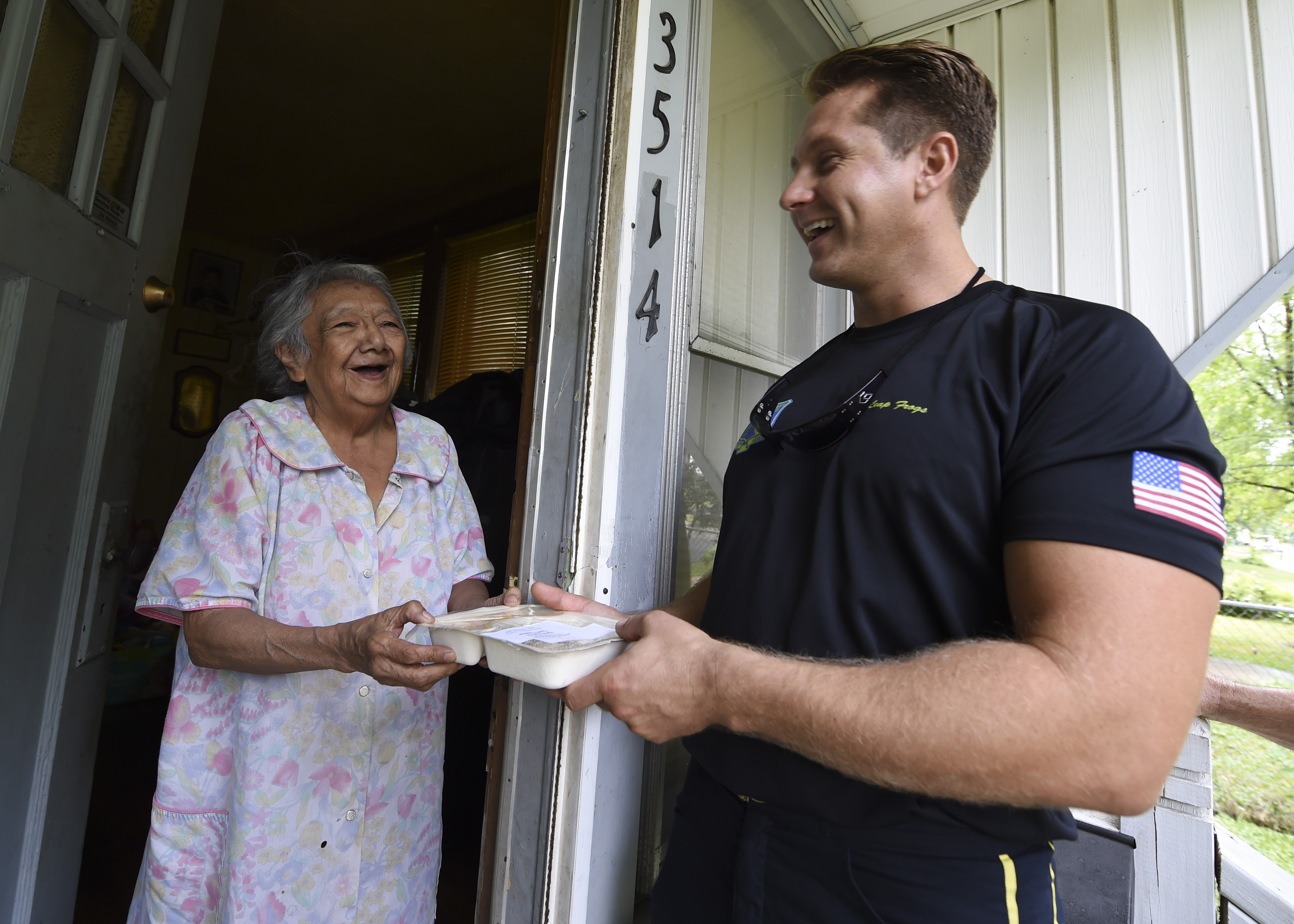
A Meals on Wheels delivery in Minneapolis, Minnesota, in 2017

Meals on Wheels America is the community-based organization dedicated to providing nutrition and helping to eliminate isolation among the elderly. It supports more than 5,000 communities across the United States. Situated in Arlington, Virginia, the Meals on Wheels America is headed by President and CEO Ellie Hollander. It is the oldest and largest national organization supporting community-based senior nutrition programs across the country. Meals on Wheels America is a non-profit organization which works towards improving information and services provided to senior citizens.

== Vision ==
Meals on Wheels of America is a national organization of community-based senior nutrition programs providing over one million meals each day. According to the website, the vision of Meals on Wheels of America is to see no senior go hungry by providing meals to seniors at a fraction of the cost of living in a senior facility. Through this program, billions of dollars can be saved everyday in Medicare and Medicaid costs.
