= Ewuare II =

Oba of Benin (2016–present)

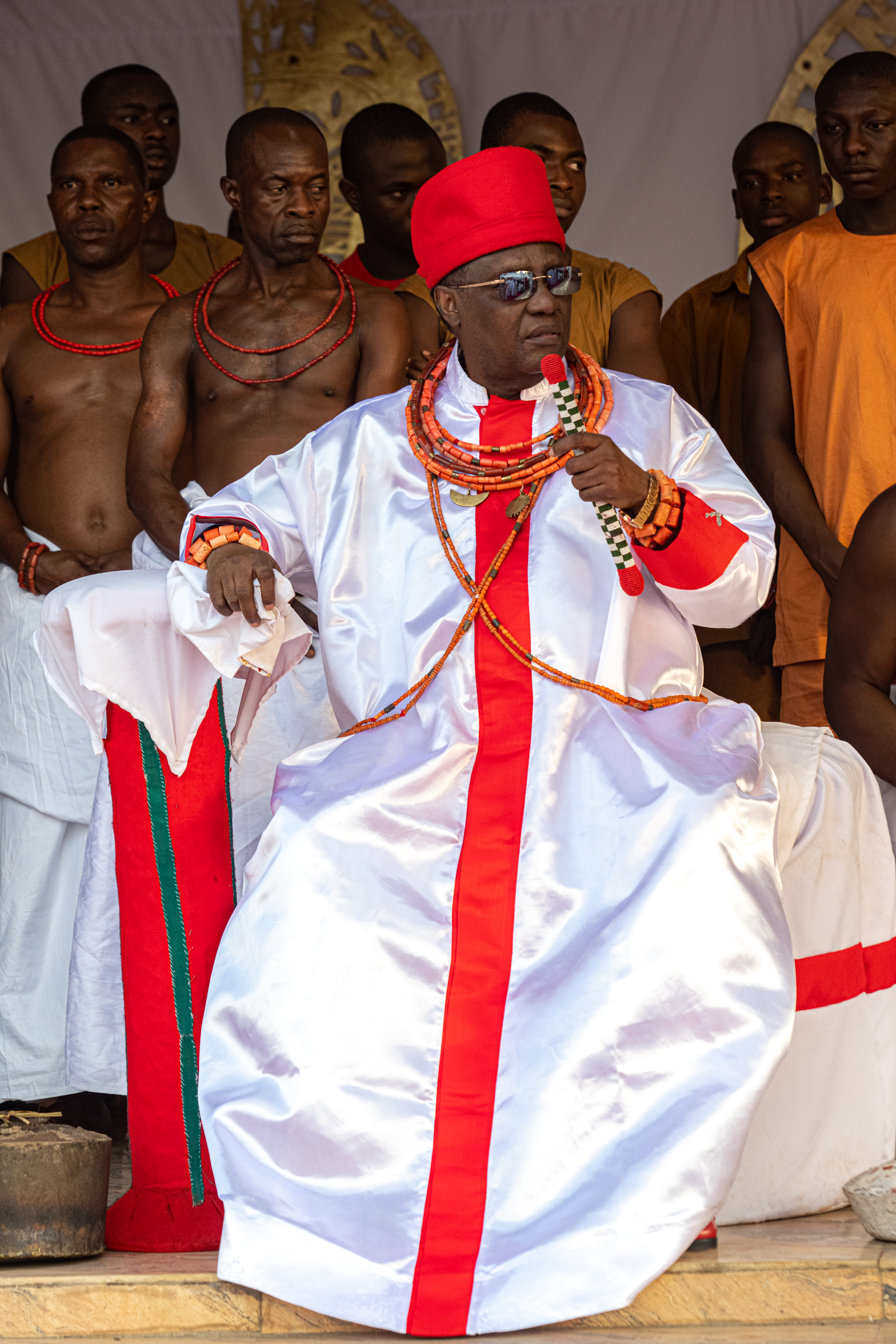
- Ewuare II in 2023

Oba of Benin
- Reign: 2016–present
- Predecessor: Erediauwa
- Born: Eheneden Erediauwa; 20 October 1953 (age 73)
- Spouses: 5
- Issue: At least 4
- Father: Erediauwa

Ewuare II (born 20 October 1953) was crowned the Oba of Benin on 20 October 2016. He is the thirty-ninth Oba, a title created for the Head of State (Emperor) of the Benin Empire at some time between 1180 and 1300.

== Education ==
Eheneden Erediauwa, as he was known before becoming Oba of Benin, attended Edo College in Benin City (Nigeria) from 1965 to 1967 and Immaculate Conception College (also in Benin City) from 1968 to 1970. He got his A-Level Certificate from South Thames College, London. He graduated with an economics degree from the University of Wales, UK and holds a Master of Public Administration degree from Rutgers University Graduate School, New Jersey, USA.

== Career ==
He worked at the United Nations between 1981 and 1982. He also served as Nigeria's Ambassador to Angola and Sweden, with accreditation to Norway, Denmark and the Republic of Finland. He was also Nigeria's Ambassador to Italy.

== Reign ==
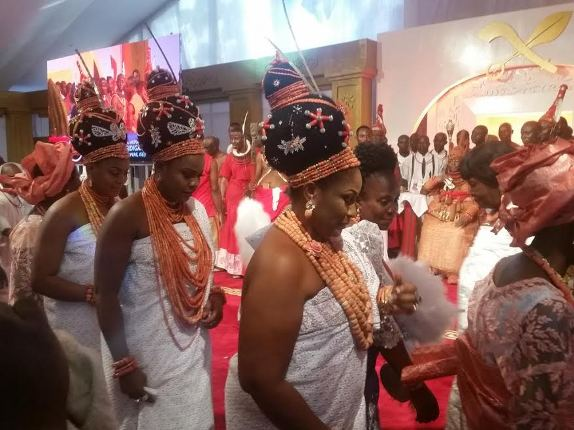
The Oba's wives, at his coronation in 2016

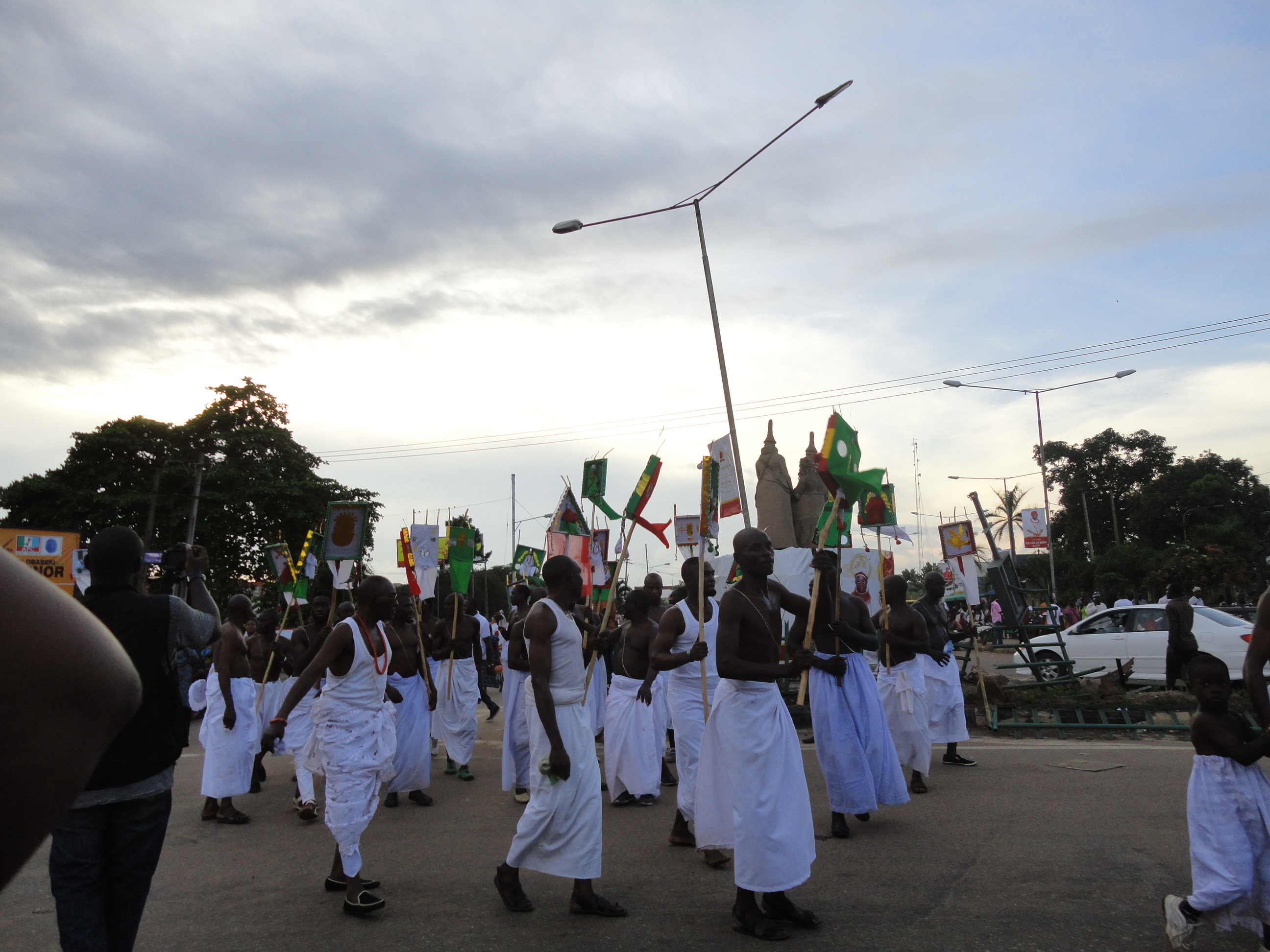
Procession of high priests at the coronation in 2016

Ewuare II chose his name as tribute to the 15th-century Ewuare I. Since his ascension to the throne, Ewuare II worked closely with Godwin Obaseki, a former governor of Edo State. Like many of his predecessors, he started his rule by demanding that the spiritually and historically important Benin Bronzes that were taken during the Benin Expedition of 1897 by the British Empire be returned.

In October 2017, he celebrated his first anniversary on the throne, with great participation by the local populace as well as several officials, politicians, and visitors from other parts of Nigeria such as Lagos, Calabar, and Jos. The Sokoto Sultanate Council and Ile-Ife's royal family also sent representatives to take part in the celebrations.

In 2018, Ewuare II issued a curse against any juju priest involved in carrying out human trafficking within his domain, and he publicly revoked all curses used by priests to manipulate trafficking victims. One analyst reported that "what the oba has done is likely to be more effective than anything the international anti-trafficking community has managed to do after millions of dollars and many years".

During the governorship campaign in the Edo State 2020 election, the Oba encouraged all political players to conduct themselves peacefully, an act that accorded him praises by groups such as the Edo Equity Forum (EEF) as well as the Allied Peoples Movement (APM).

In 2021, the University of Aberdeen approved the repatriation of one of the Benin Bronzes, which was handed to a delegation that included representatives of Ewuare II on 28 October 2021. He received it, and a bronze cockerel returned by Jesus College, Cambridge, at a ceremony in the royal palace in Benin City on 19 February 2022.

== Personal life ==
By the time he was crowned Oba, Ewuare was married to Queen Iroghama (Obazuaye N'erie), Princess Iyayiota (Obazuwa N'erie) and Princess Ikpakpa (Ohe N'erie). He later married more women.

== Notes ==
Ewuare II Oba of Benin Born: 20 October 1953
Regnal titles
| Preceded by Erediauwa | Oba of Benin; 2016 – present | Succeeded by Incumbent |
