= Lower Niger Bronze Industries =

Unassigned alloy works from Nigeria

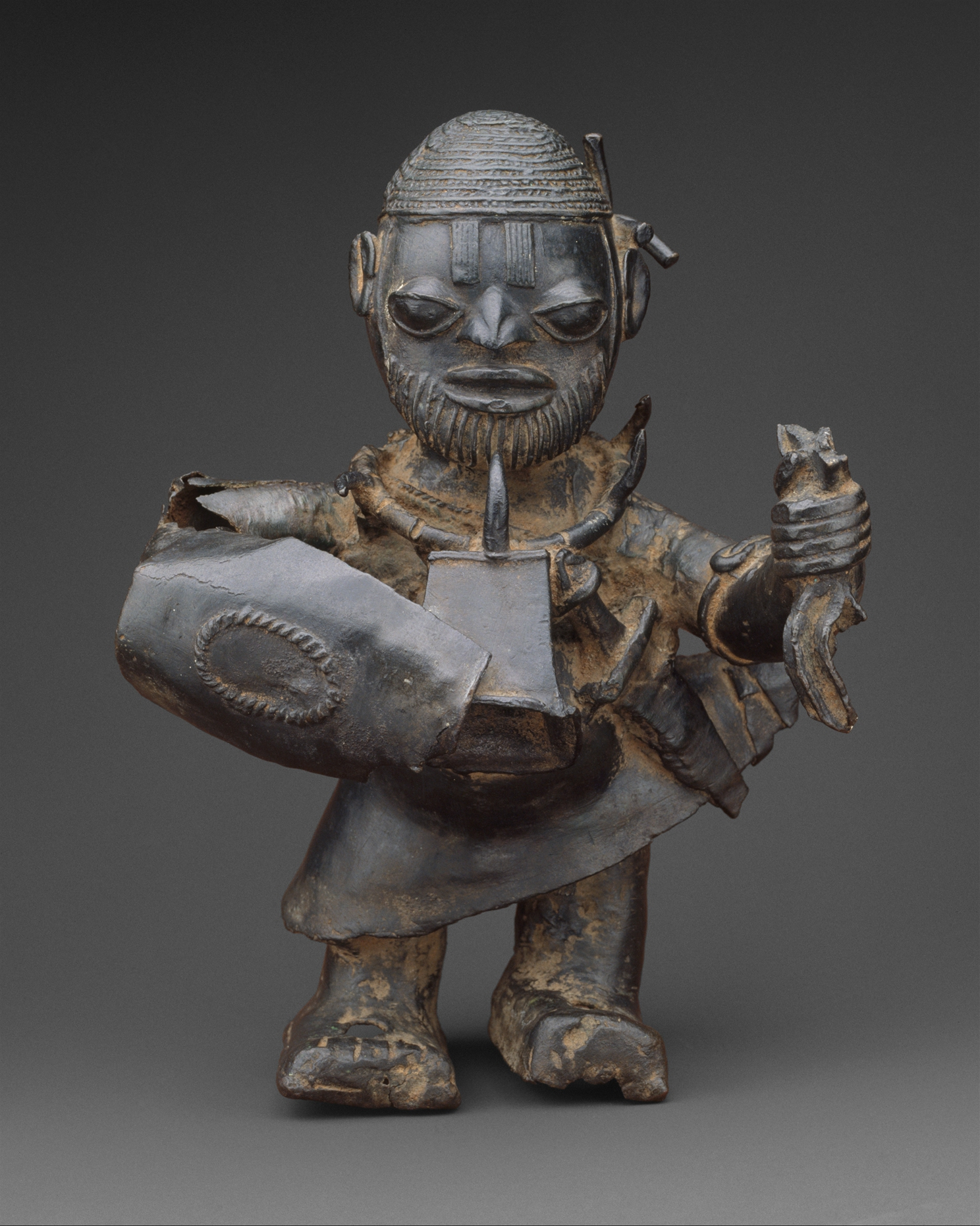
Copper Alloy Sculpture of man belonging to a Lower Niger Bronze Industry

"Lower Niger Bronze Industry" is essentially a catch-all term referring either to any unattributed "Bronze" (in reality, copper alloy) work produced in the Lower Niger, or, more commonly, to every "Bronze" work produced in the Lower Niger which cannot be immediately attributed to more famous traditions of Benin and Yoruba (particularly Ife) metallurgy. These works, referred to in recent texts as LNBs, are quite distinct from previously mentioned ones in both style and production, but are also internally diverse; they do not comprise a single tradition: "while this omnibus term is still with us, no one would continue to lump the Tada-Jebba bronzes together with those excavated at Igbo-Ukwu, even as sub-styles. These and the other provisional groupings reflect distinctly different traditions. Today even the search for a single alternate bronzecasting center has broadened as several independent workshops have been confirmed." As such, one may consider "Lower Bronze Industry" to actually mean Bronze-works which have not yet been assigned to broader traditions, or whose encapsulating traditions/contexts are (for now) poorly understood - different scholars additionally do not agree on which pieces should be given the classification. However, though little is known about them, their mere existence suggests that Bronze working was more widely spread in Nigeria than was once known.

== Historiography ==
The term "Lower Niger Bronze Industry" was coined by William Fagg in his 1963 Nigerian Images, to describe a phenomenon he had already observed: many copper alloy works found in Southern Nigeria did not fit the artistic conventions of more famous Benin, Ife, and Igbo-Ukwu cultural-complexes. According to Peek, 2020, Fagg grouped these together while imagining "a single 'industry' or cultural complex to be responsible for these castings", probably in the Idah area and attributable to the Igala; following this version of events, the pieces would have eventually ended up in Benin City, from which they were ultimately taken during the Benin Expedition. However, as there were few known pieces of this distinct "Lower Niger tradition" at the time, its existence as a widespread phenomenon (or, indeed, at all) was doubted by some: "I still see no evidence... unless the term is taken in relation to the whole River Niger and not to Nigeria alone," wrote Murray in a private correspondence.

Research following Fagg and prior to Peek was relatively sparse, however a notable development occurred in 1973 when Willet wrote of "a number of pieces which are in styles quite distinct from that of Benin, and which belong to the grouping which William Fagg first set up to embrace alien works which had been included in the Benin corpus-the Lower Niger Bronze Industry". Willet wrote that these pieces "embrace such a variety of styles that [he preferred] to refer to 'Industries'" instead of a single 'Industry', thus coining the alternate taxonomy "Lower Niger Bronze Industries".

In 2020, Phillip M. Peek (not to be confused with Phillip S. Peek) published a comprehensive book on Lower Niger Bronzes entitled The Lower Niger Bronzes: Beyond Igbo-Ukwu, Ife, and Benin. In it, he examines manillas, vessels, figures, masks, skulls, scepters, and "the most numerous of LNBs", bells, alongside the cultural complexes of Ovo and the Tsoede Bronzes. Peek approaches these pieces attempting to understand them as they stand, in light of Southern Nigeria's current ethnic landscape, and also as evidences of a bygone era in which the ethnic landscape of that region was different to that of today.

== Example Pieces ==
Lower Niger Bronze Industry objects are widely varied; the British museum alone has numerous anklets, armlets, bells, figures, and manillas attributable to the complex.

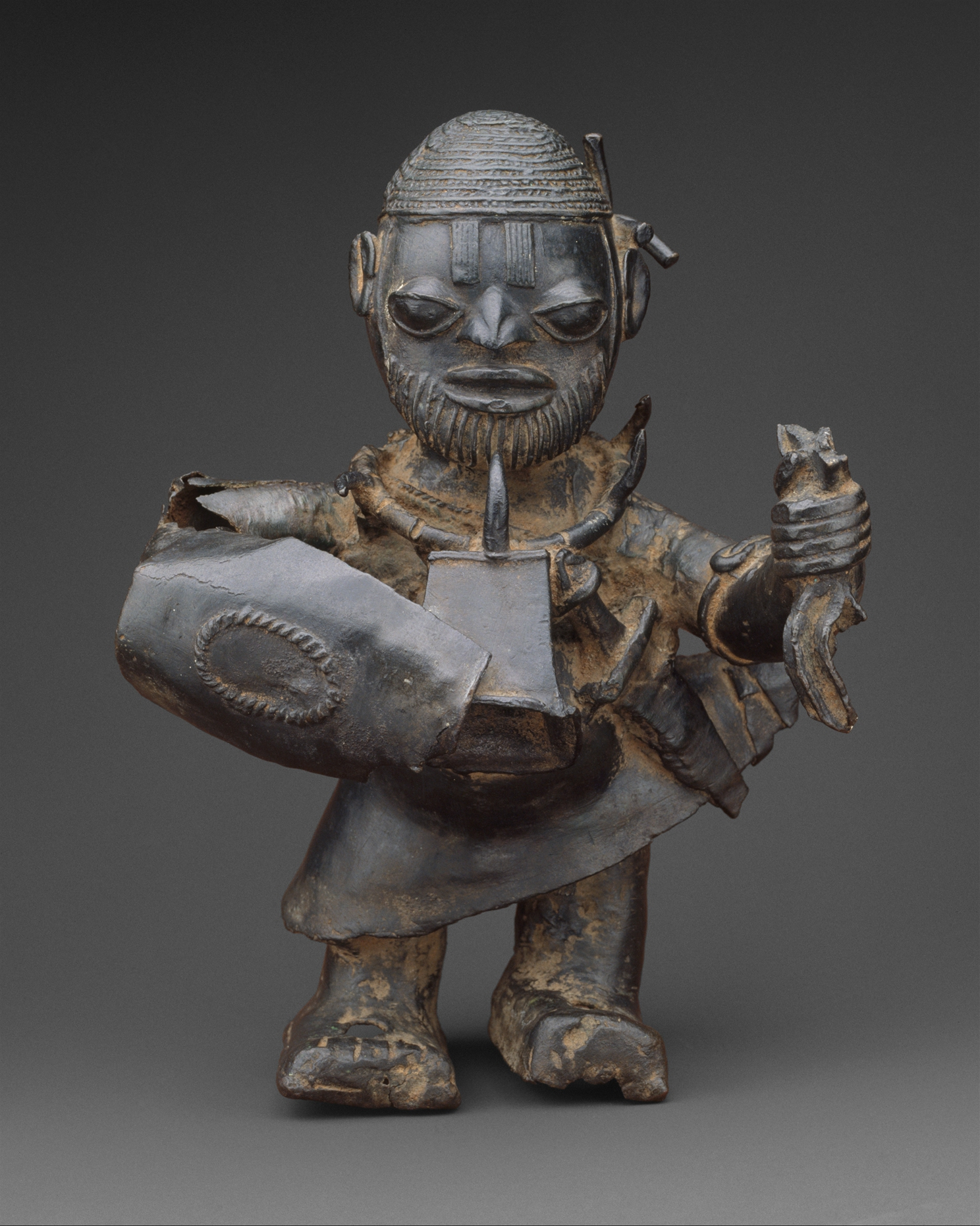
Male Warrior Figure, currently kept in MET.

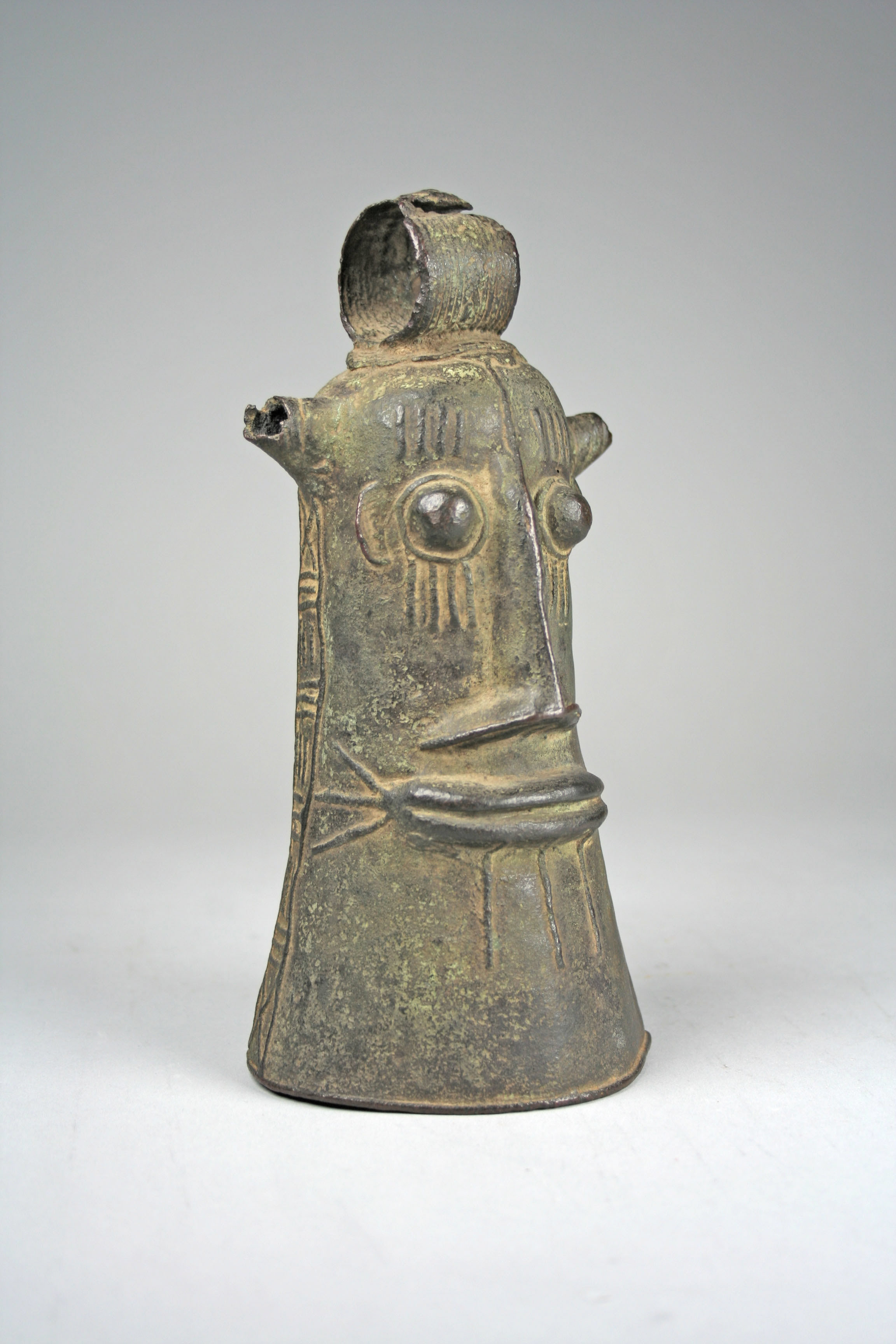
Bell with face design, currently kept in MET.

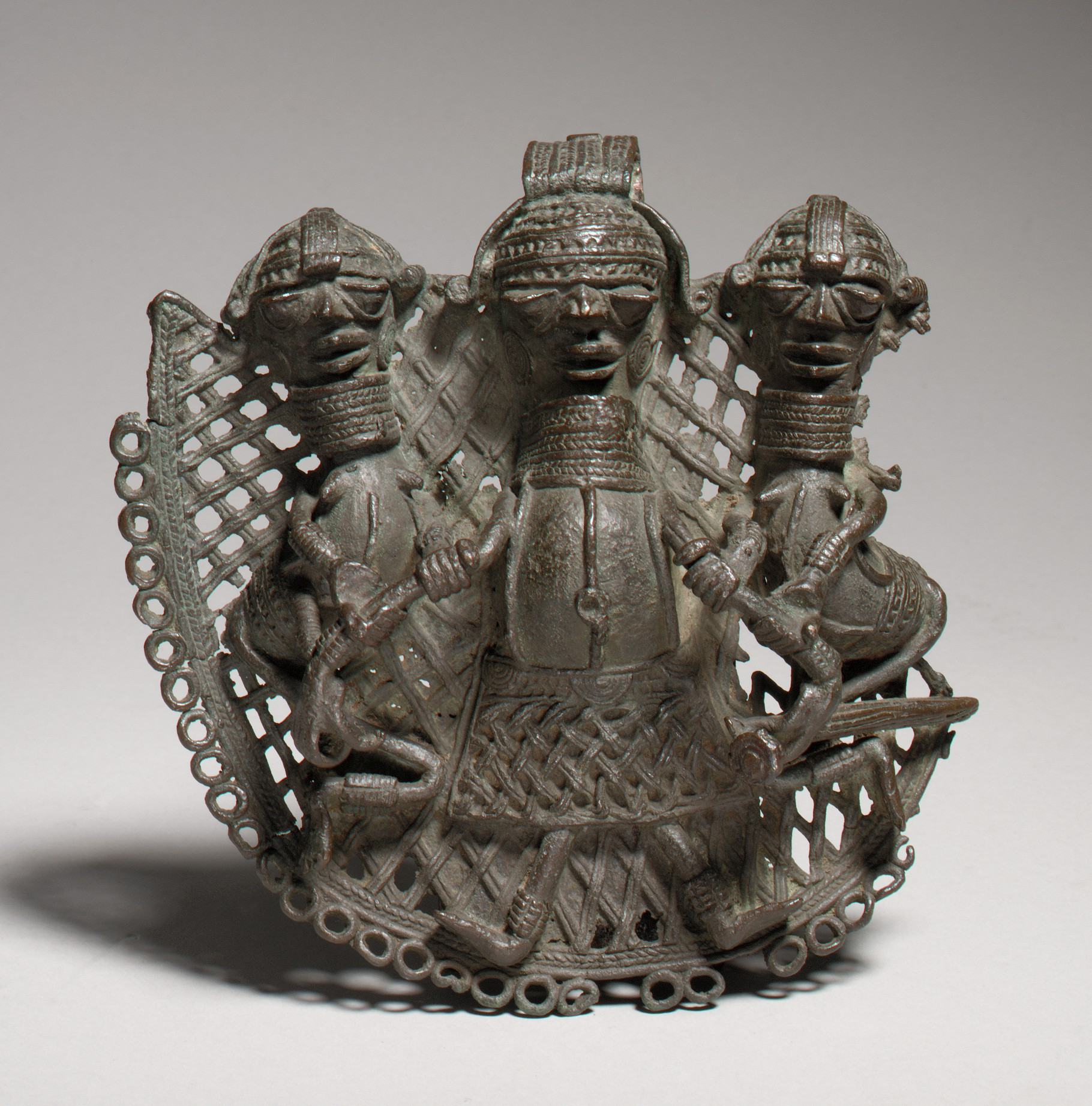
Pendant depicting multiple figures, currently kept in MET.

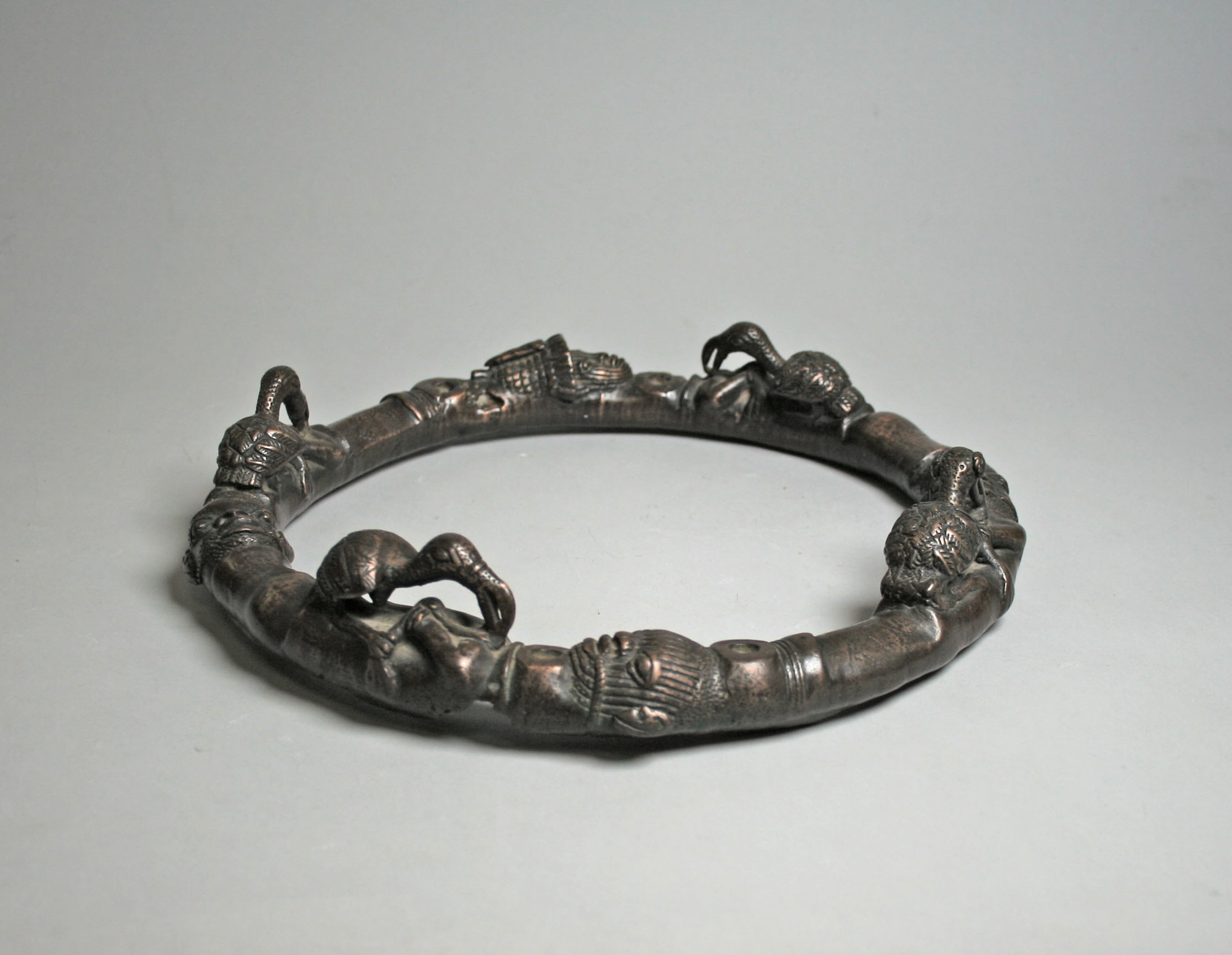
Altar Ring, currently kept in MET.

== Future Research ==
One of many problems noted by Peek in his 2020 publication is the difficulty of locating LNBs' precise origins: "These virtually indestructible metal objects are relatively small and mobile with no limits to their physical distribution", particularly problematic because "movement... was extensive in the past despite the dense rainforest." However, this is in some senses a blessing in disguise. Understanding these works of art, which predate the current arrangement of ethnicities in Nigeria, may be critical for research into the emergence of Nigeria's contemporary ethnic landscape.

== See also ==
- Bronze sculpture
- Benin Bronzes
- Benin court and ceremonial art
- Igbo Ukwu
- Yoruba art
- African art
- Plastic arts
- Art in bronze and brass
- Sculpture
