= Nigerian National Museum =

National museum of Nigeria

Coordinates: 6°26′40″N 3°24′12″E

- View of the museum's exterior
- Established: 1957
- Location: Onikan, Lagos Island, Lagos, Nigeria
- Collections: Nigerian art, including pieces of statuary and carvings and archaeological and ethnographic exhibits
- Founder: Kenneth Murray
- Website: lagosmuseum.ng

The Nigerian National Museum is a national museum of Nigeria, located in the city of Lagos. The museum has a notable collection of Nigerian art, including pieces of statuary, carvings, and archaeological and ethnographic exhibits. The national museum has been reopened in april 2026 after a major overhaul of the facility. The renovation included structural upgrades, improved power infrastructure and the digitisation of artefacts.

The museum is located at Onikan, Lagos Island, Lagos State. The museum is administered by the National Commission for Museums and Monuments.

== History ==
In July 1948, the first architectural sketches of the museum were submitted to a conference on museum policy in Nigeria. The museum was founded in 1957 by the English archaeologist Kenneth Murray. The main purpose of constructing this museum was to preserve different historical artifacts of Nigeria. Kenneth Murray had collected several traditional masks from Cross River State, these masks were displayed in the museum. During the first decade of the museum's existence, the British Museum gave the Nigerian National Museum two plaques and other artifacts. In 2018, a virtual tour of the museum was added using an adapted version of Google Street View along with other tourist sites in Nigeria.

== Collections ==
The museum houses the collections of artifacts belonging to different cultures of the ethnic groups in Nigeria. Of note is a terracotta human head known as the Jemaa Head (c. 900 to 200 BC), part of the Nok culture. The size of the collection is estimated at 47,000 objects, made of different materials such as wood, ivory, metal and terracotta. The artifacts include masks, textiles, drums, dane guns and wooden figures. Among the artifacts, in the Yoruba section, the museum includes Egungun costumes and clay pots. The museum has a collection of statues dating from different periods of Nigeria's history.

The museum also houses traditional musical instruments such as sansas, fiddles and flutes. The museum also contains divination bowls and ancestral figures made of wood, including Mumuye figures, which are used by communities in Adamawa State as well as Ikengas wooden figures, which are part of the Igbo culture. Additionally, the museum also contains a collection of masks including Ekpo masks from Calabar and Gẹlẹdẹ wooden masks.

The museum contains jewelry and crafts, as well as a collection of textiles including Akwete cloth and other textiles from the Okene, Bida and Western States areas of Nigeria.

The museum has displayed works of art by Nigerian artists such as Nike Davies-Okundaye, Abiodun Olaku, Djakow Kassi, Bruce Onobrakpeya, Bolaji Ogunwo, Yusuf Durodola, Chinze Ojobo, Nosa Iyobhabha, Duke Asidere, Ben Enwonwu, Nathaniel Hodonu, Northcote W. Thomas, Kelani Abass and Elizabeth Ekpetorson. In 2012, the museum presented an exhibition featuring artwork by artist Ndidi Dike. In November 2019, the museum organized an exhibition with art pieces by German-Nigerian artist Ngozi Schommers. The museum contains ancient crowns, Royal regalias, artifacts belonging to the Kingdom of Benin, cultural objects belonging to the Ibibio people, Igbo-Ukwu bronze artifacts, stone monoliths of the Oron culture and terracottas belonging to the Nok culture. The museum also contains photographs of the different presidents of the states of Nigeria. In the textile section, there is a collection of batik fabrics. The museum also has Ere figurines., photographs on the colonization of Nigeria and exhibits related to the culture of Ifẹ, an ancient Yoruba city.

The museum contains a variety of sculptures. Among these are the grave sculptures of the Dakakari people who inhabit Sokoto State. These types of sculptures are used in graves to commemorate the death of an important person such as a warrior, social leader or a chief. The museum also contains a sculpture of a Sukur woman in traditional dress from Adamawa State. At the entrance of the museum, also with a sculpture of a deity called Chukwu, of Igbo spirituality. The museum also houses stone sculptures of the Ekoi people. The museum also has sculptures of animals that are used in different cultures of the ethnic groups of Nigeria.

== In popular culture ==
In her travel book, Looking for Transwonderland, writer Noo Saro-Wiwa visits the museum and describes its impact on her.

== Gallery ==
Exhibition room after the renovation

Exhibition room after the renovation

Ivory mask

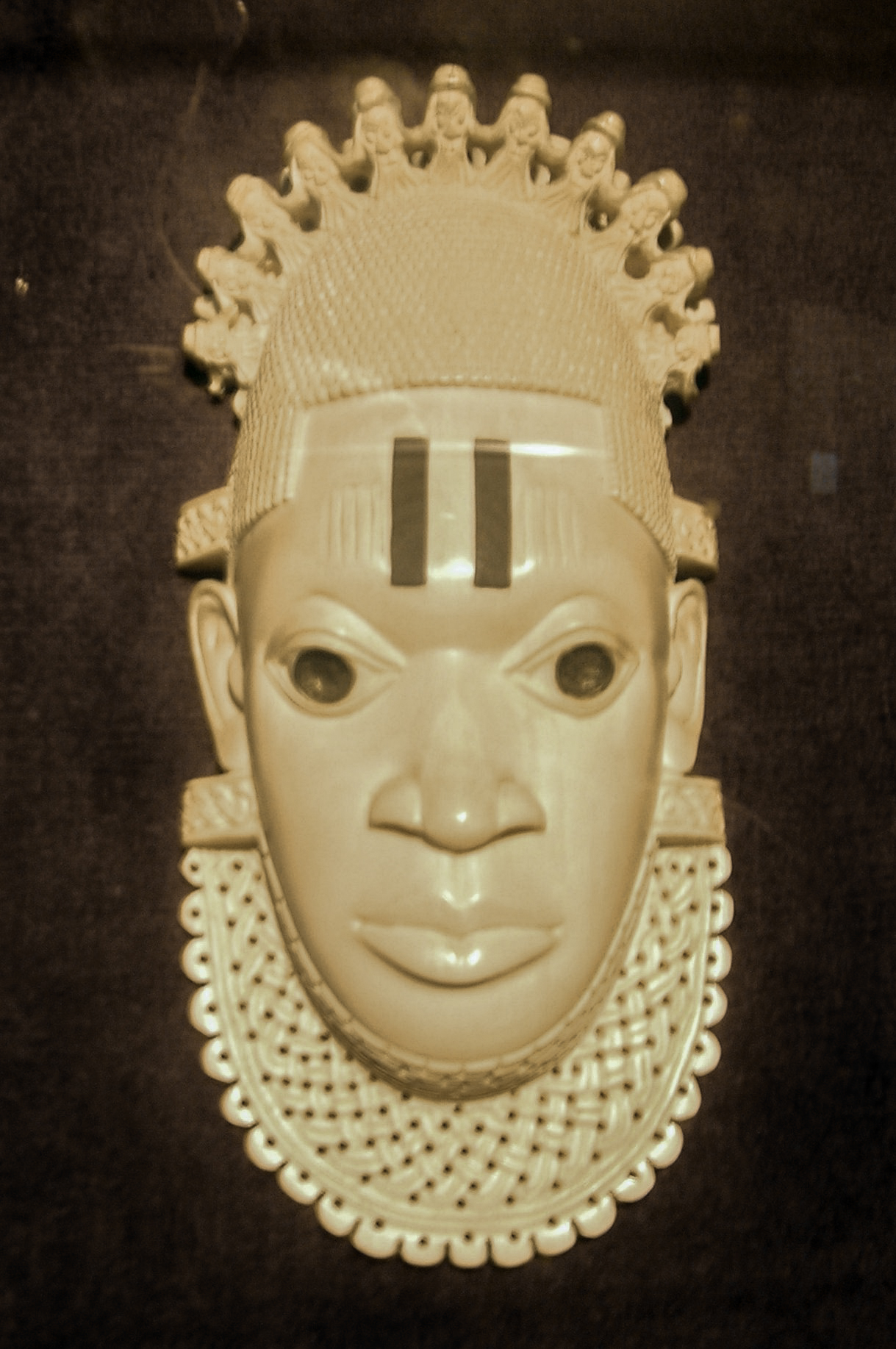
Benin mask; ivory

Bronze head

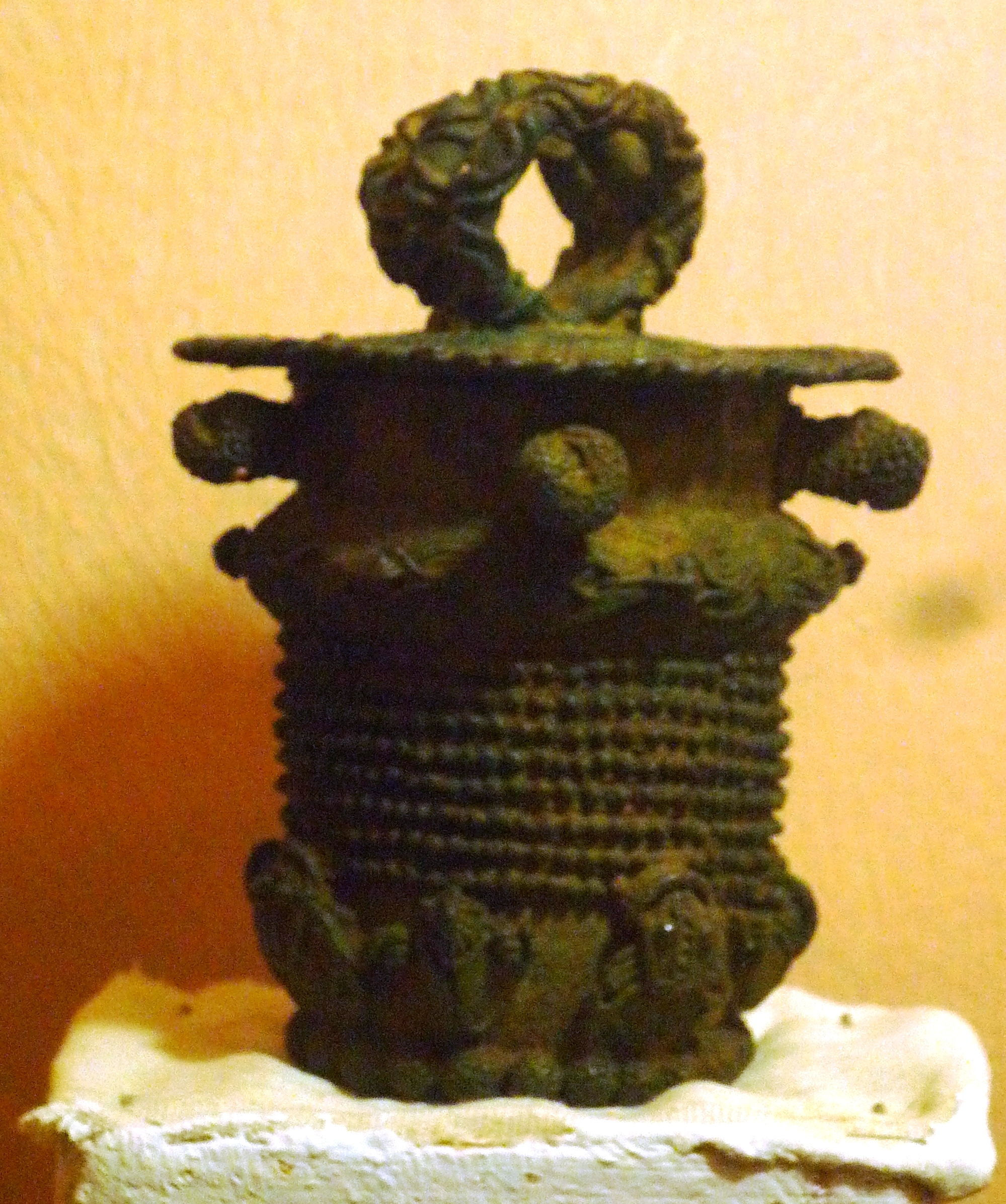
Bronze ceremonial pot; 9th century; from Igbo-Ukwu

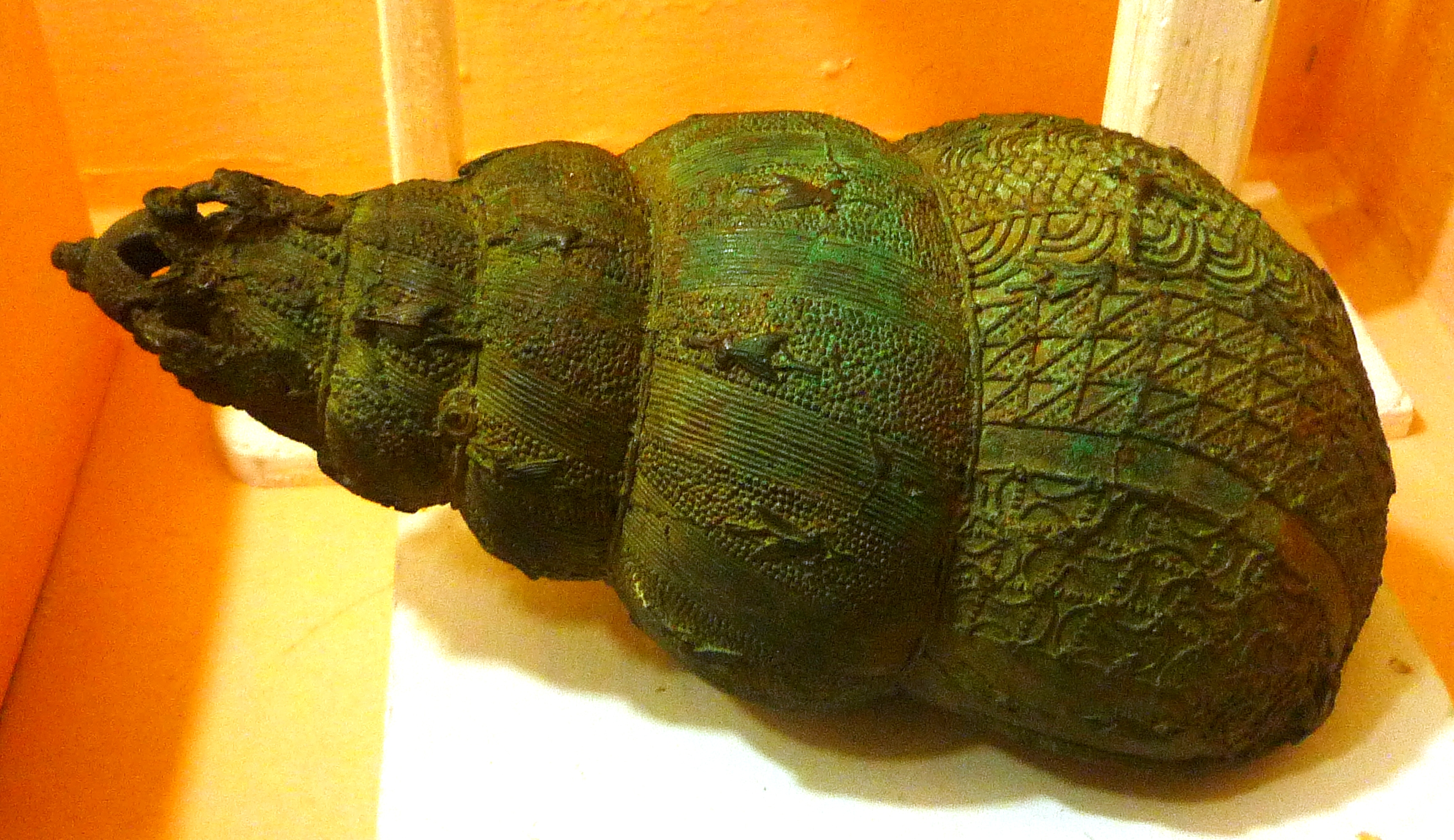
Bronze ceremonial vessel in form of a snail shell; 9th century; from Igbo-Ukwu

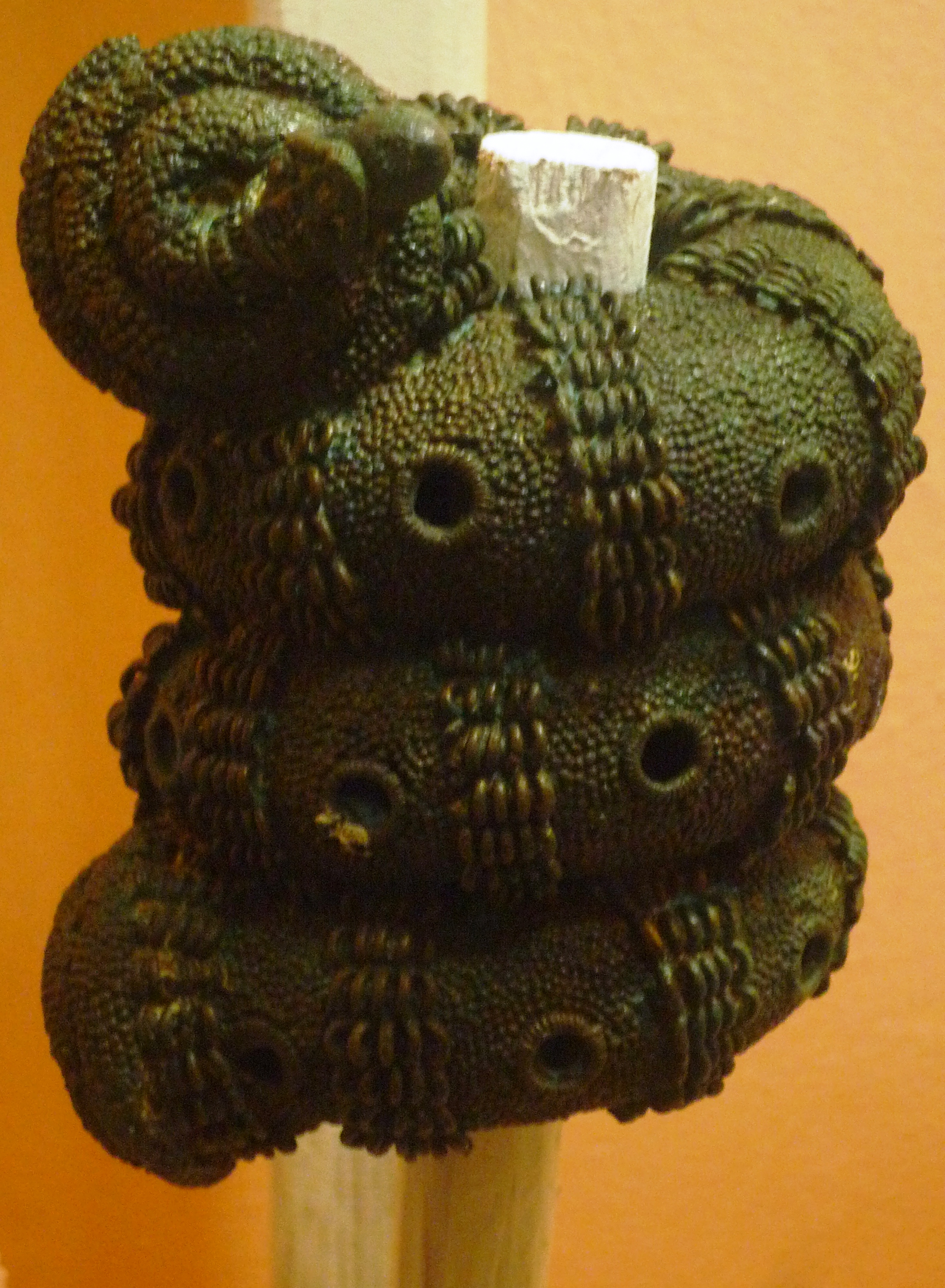
Bronze ornamental staff head; 9th century; from Igbo-Ukwu

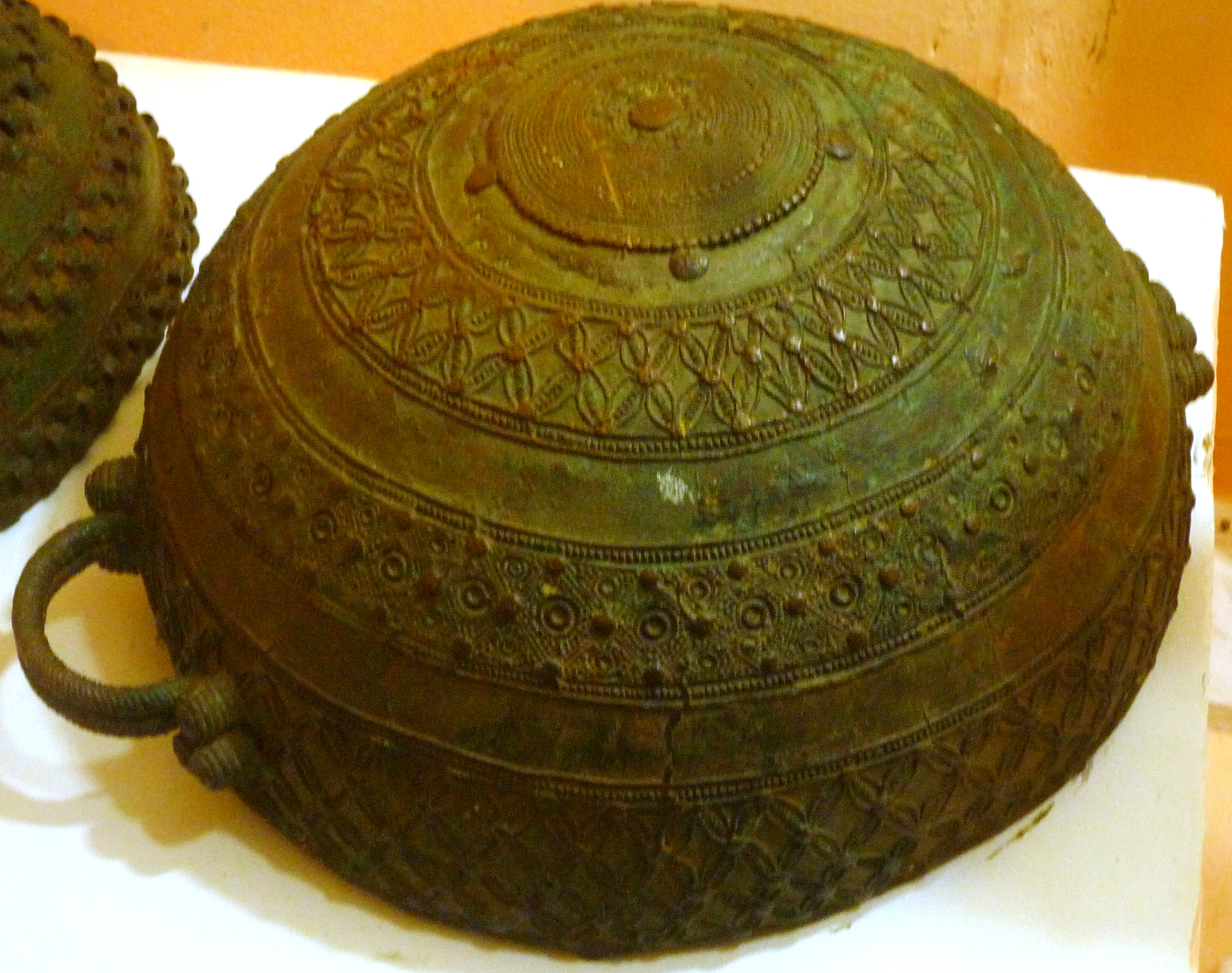
Bronze pot; 9th century; from Igbo-Ukwu

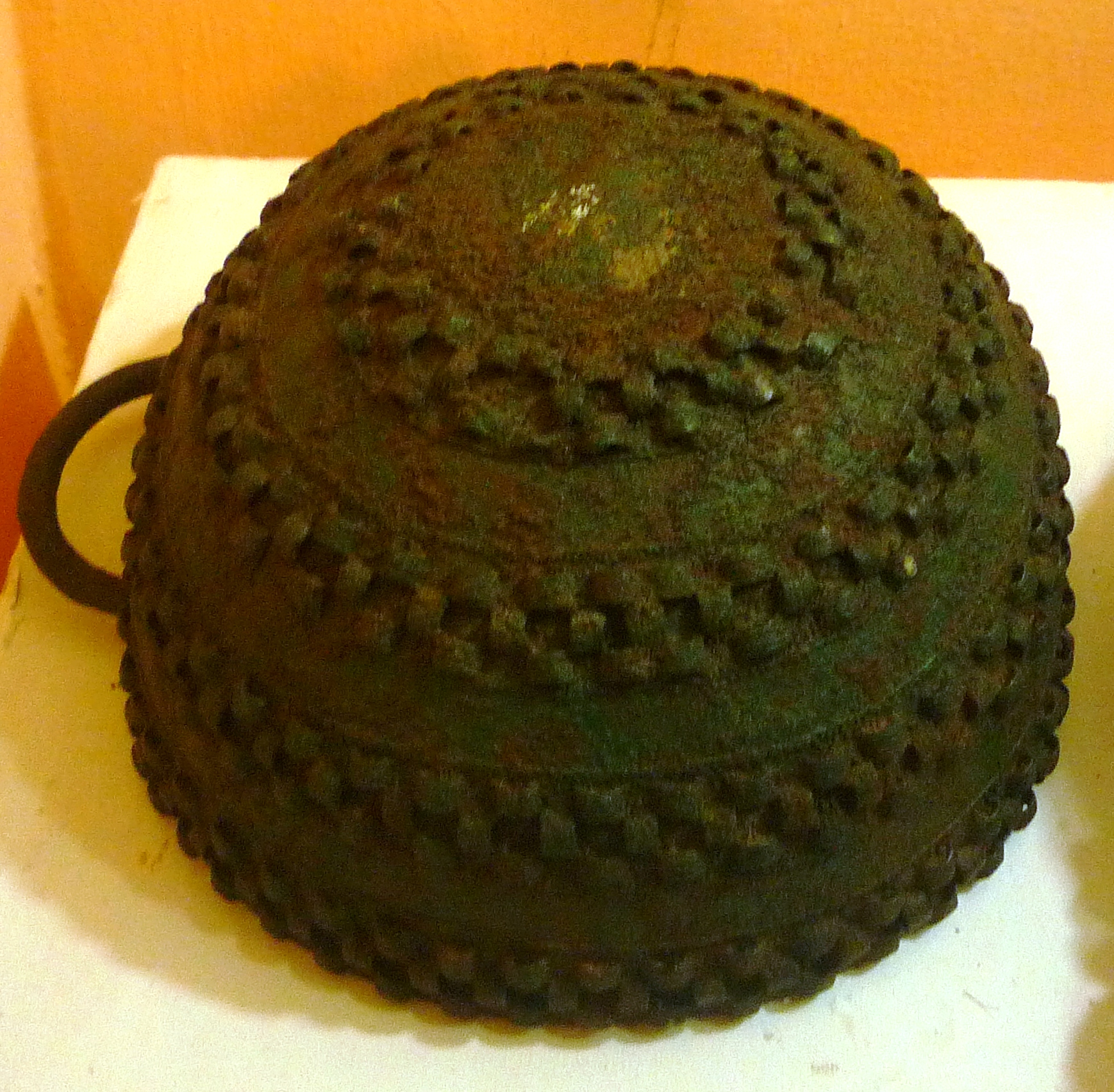
Bronze pot; 9th century; from Igbo-Ukwu

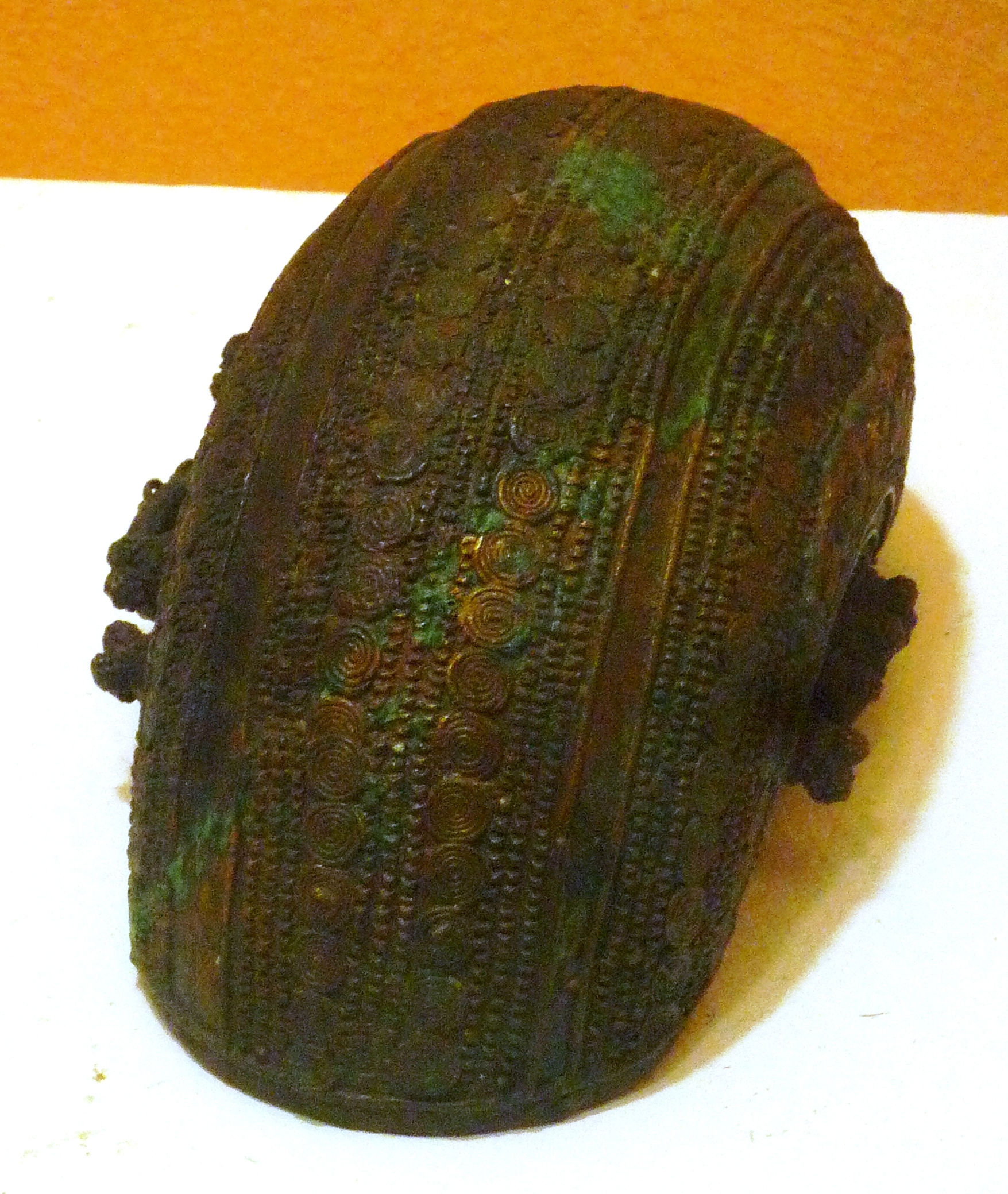
Crescentic bowl; bronze; 9th century; from Igbo-Ukwu

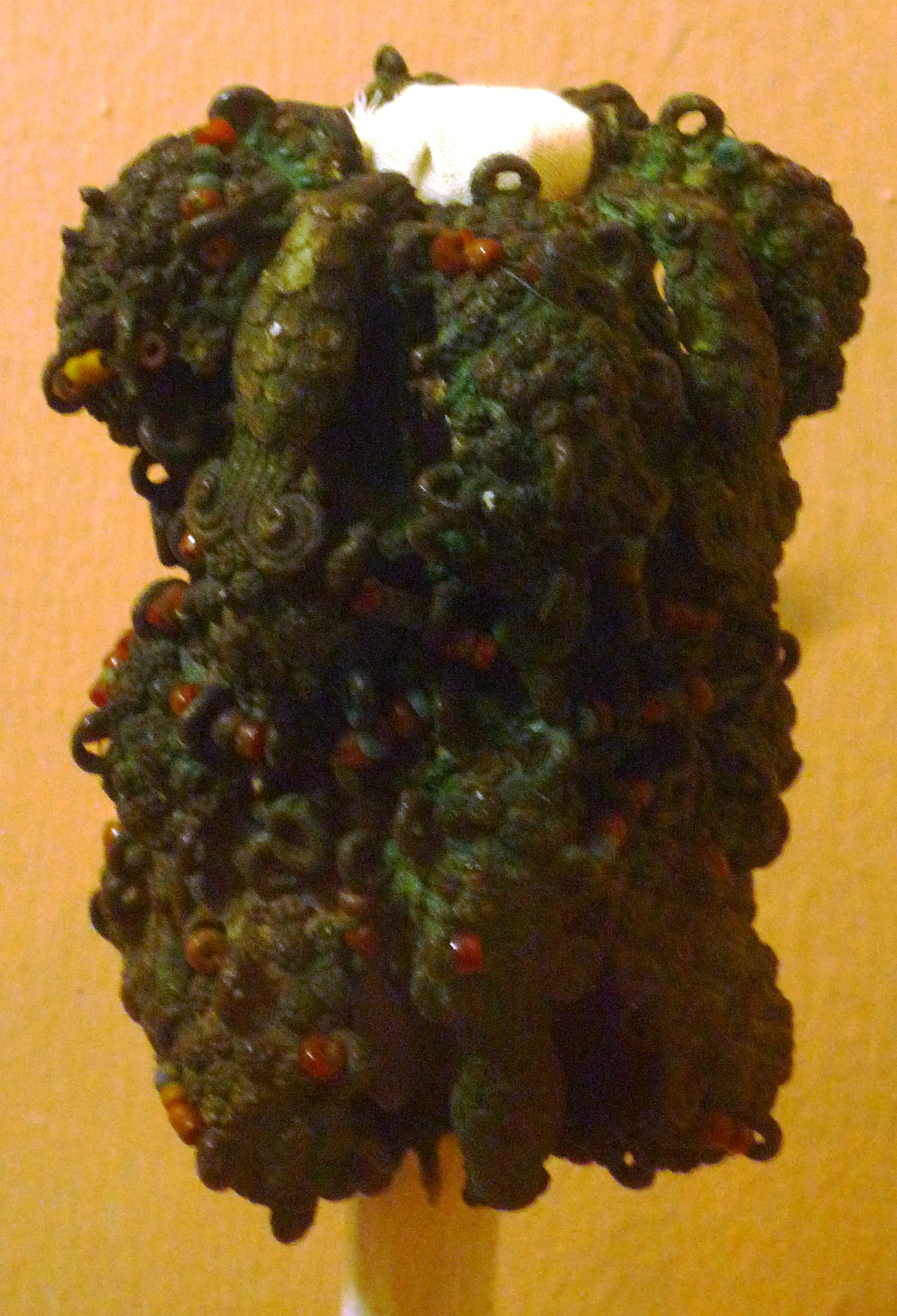
Bronze intricate ornamental staff head; 9th century; from Igbo-Ukwu

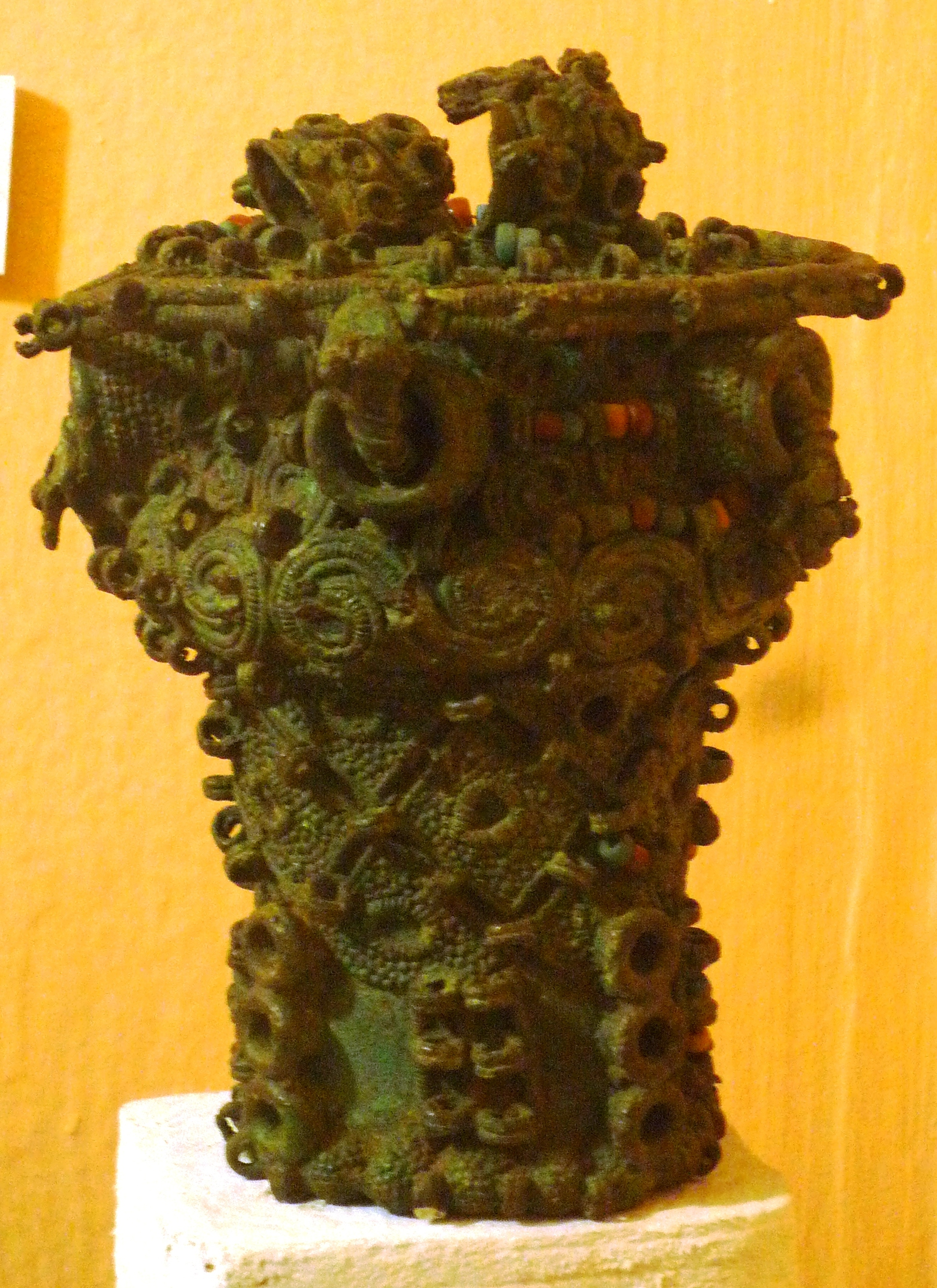
Intricate bronze ceremonial pot; 9th century; from Igbo-Ukwu

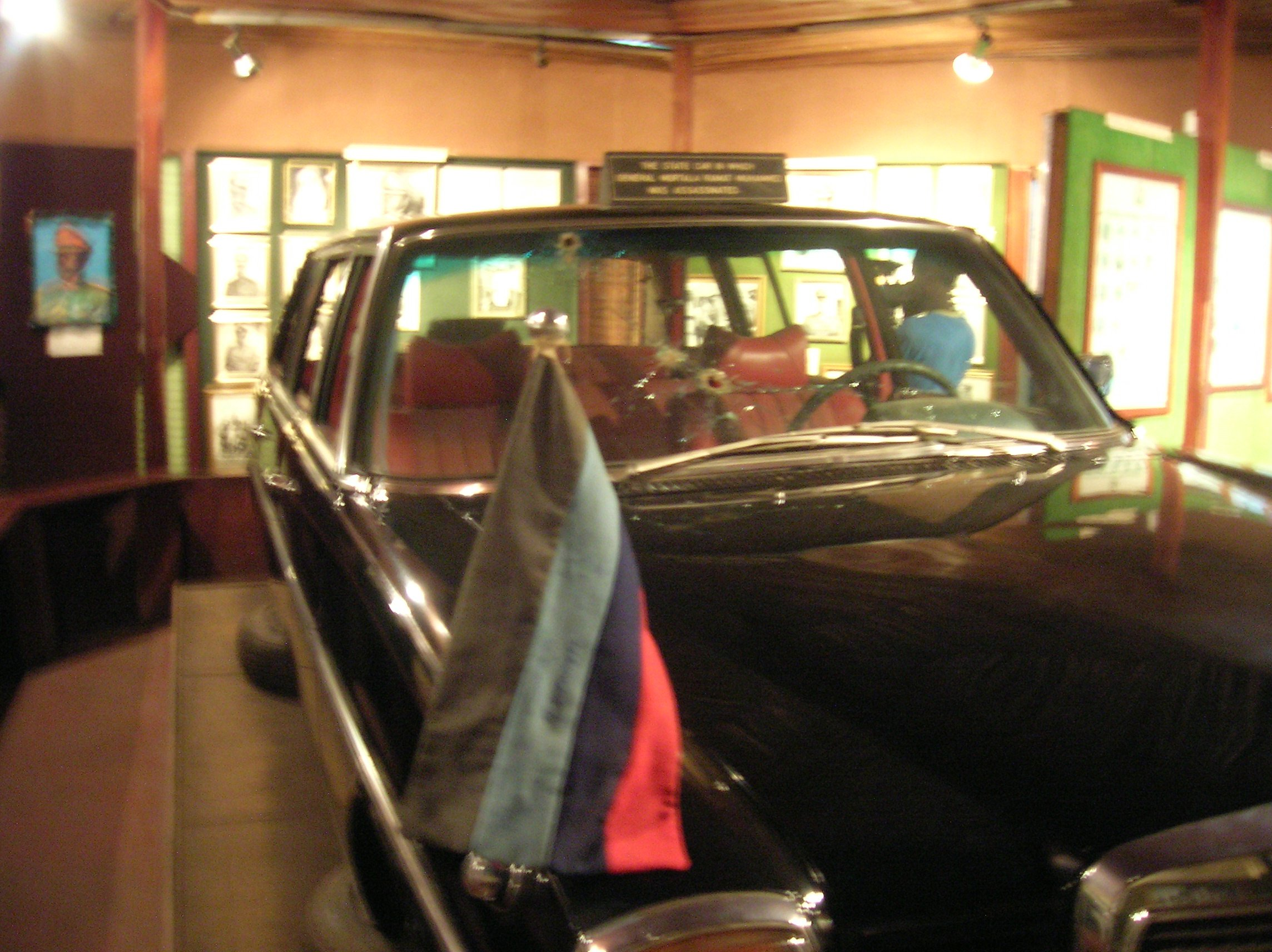
the car in which Murtala Mohammed was assassinated

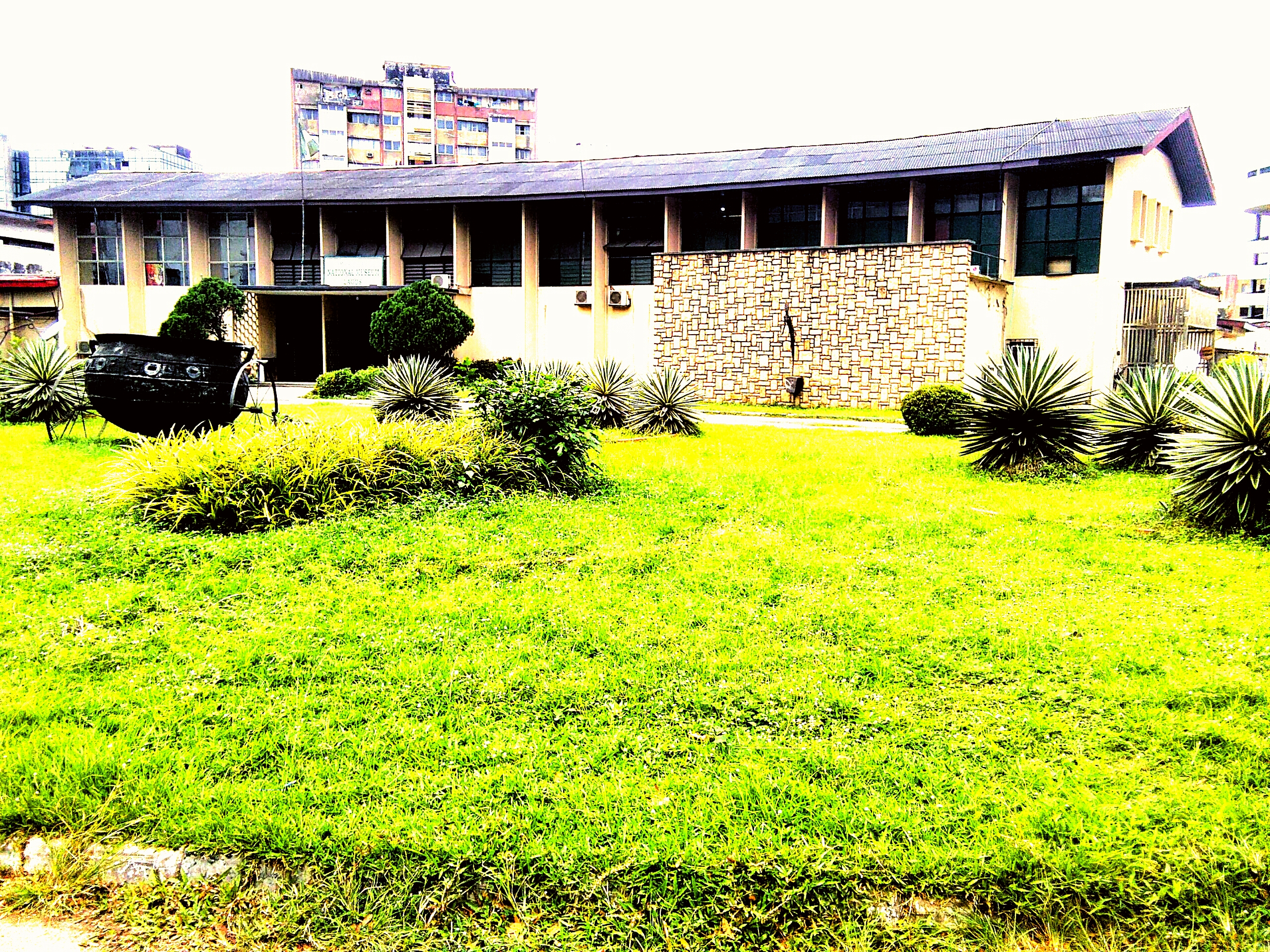

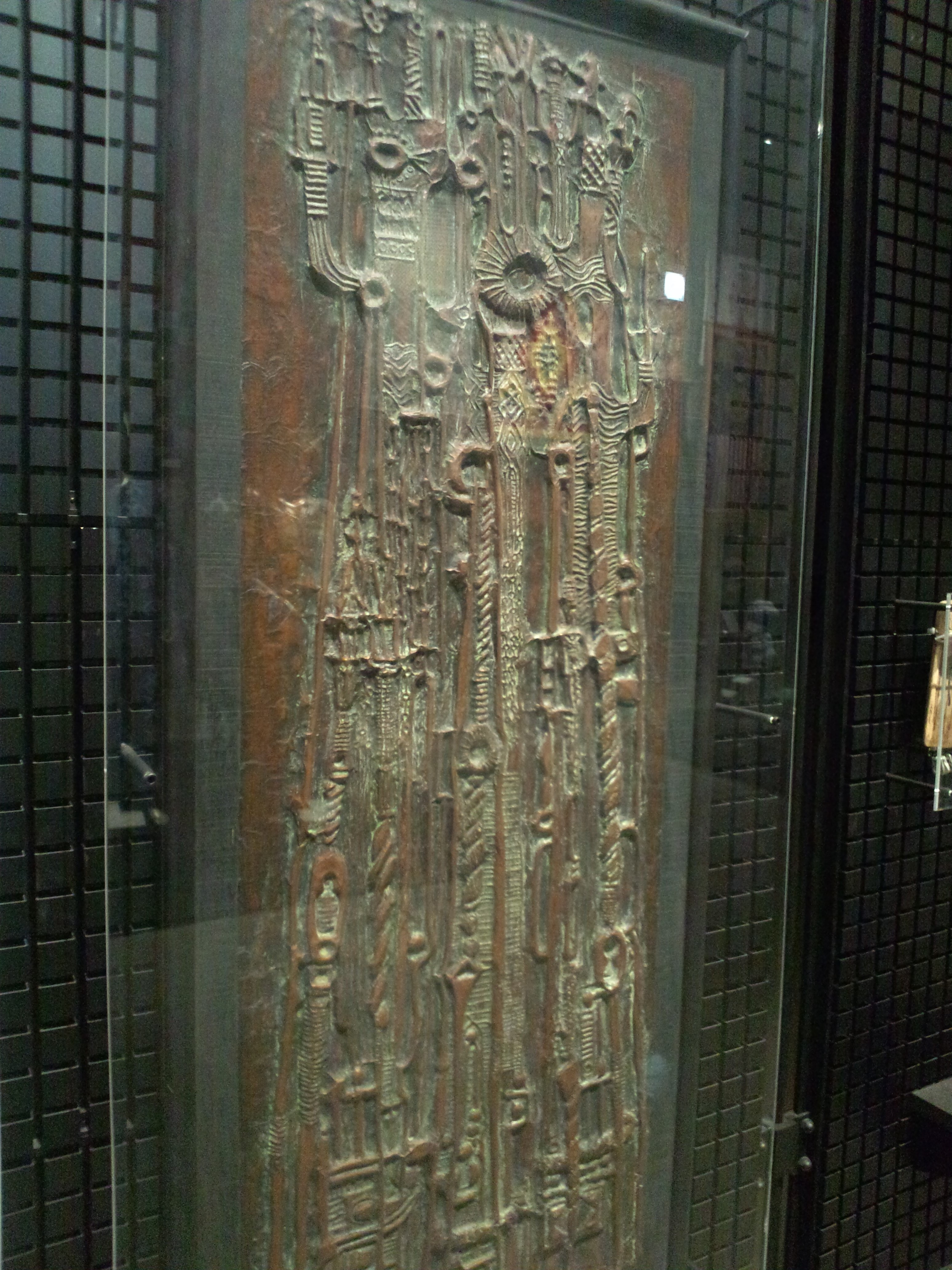

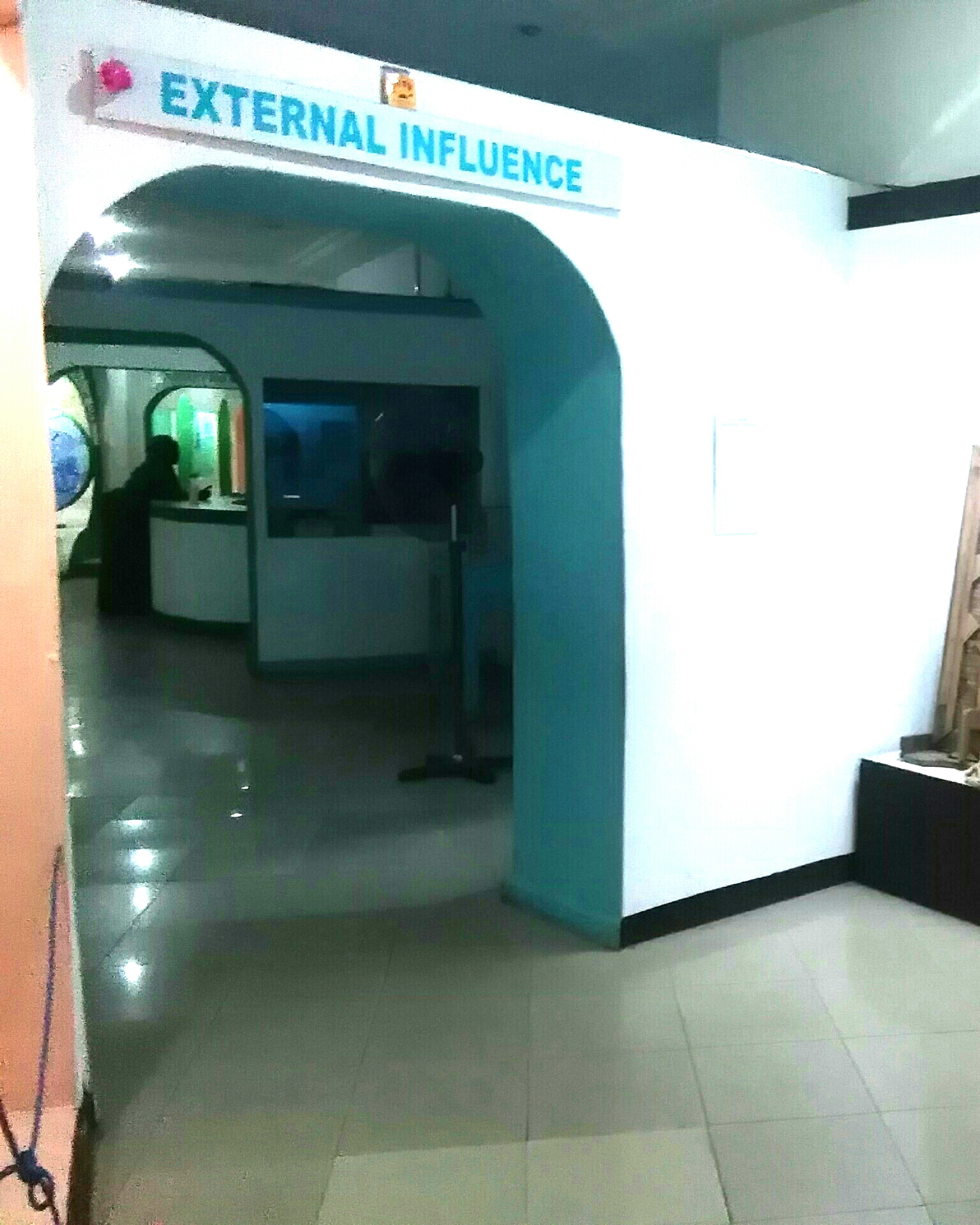

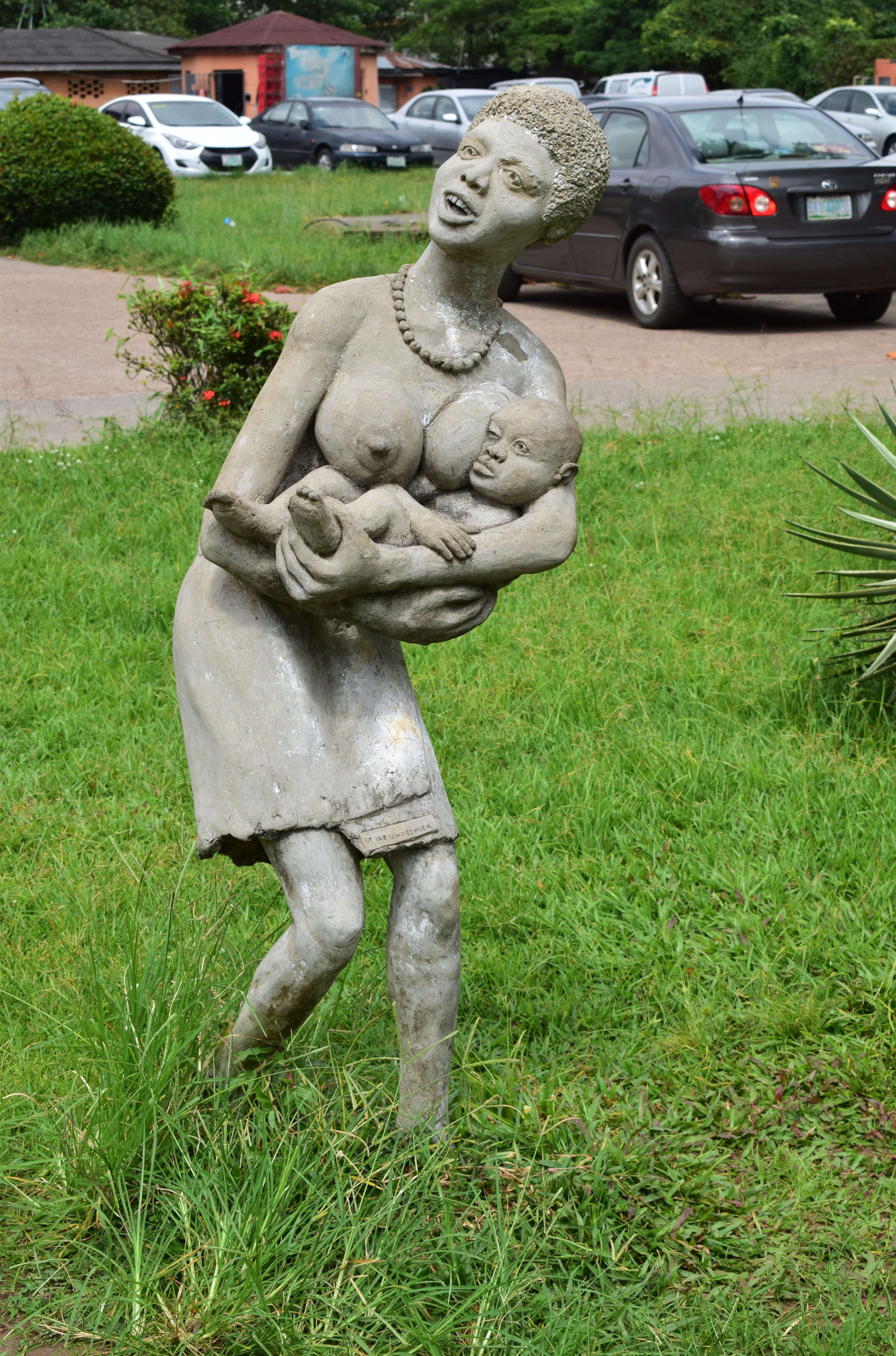

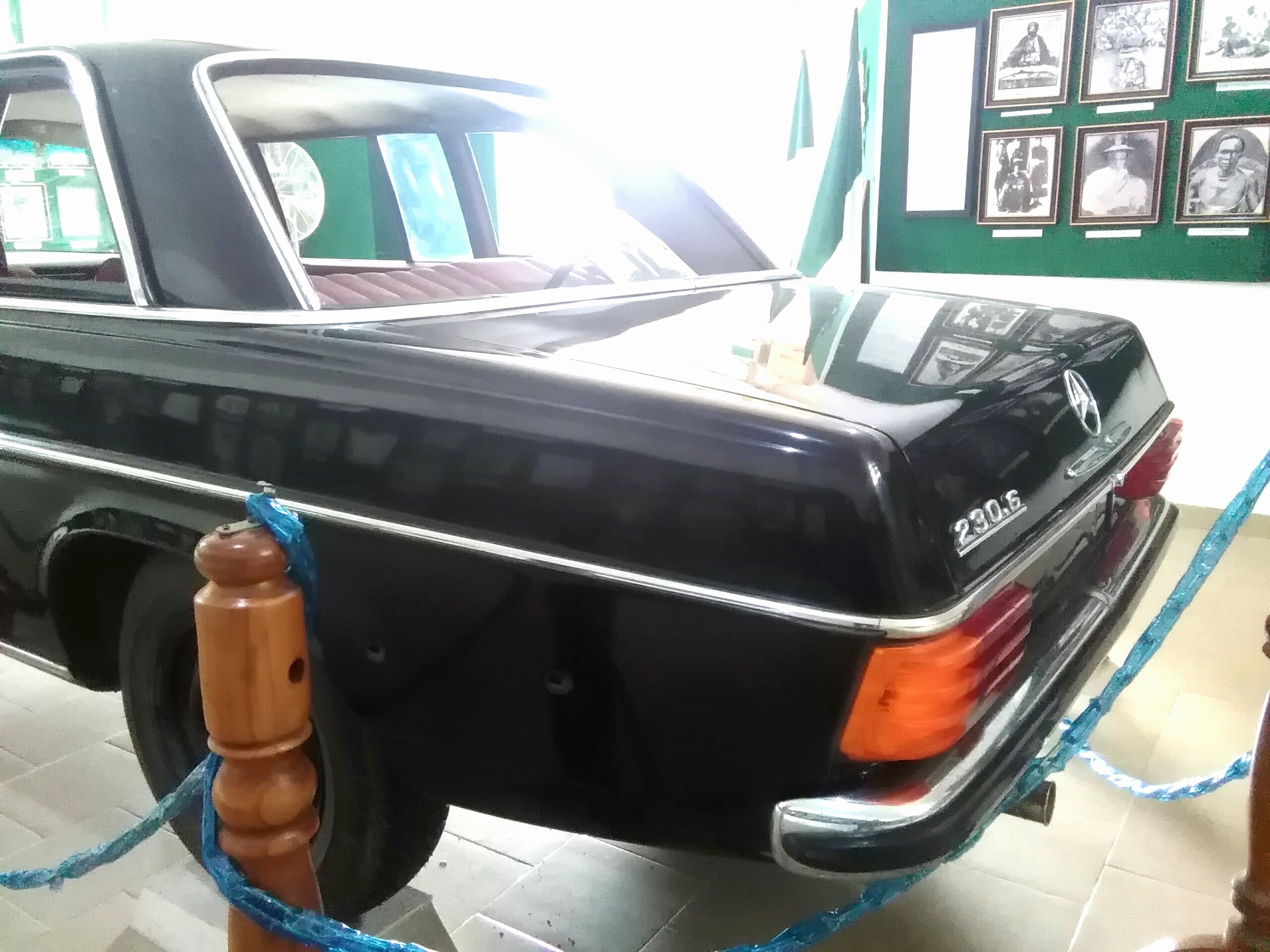

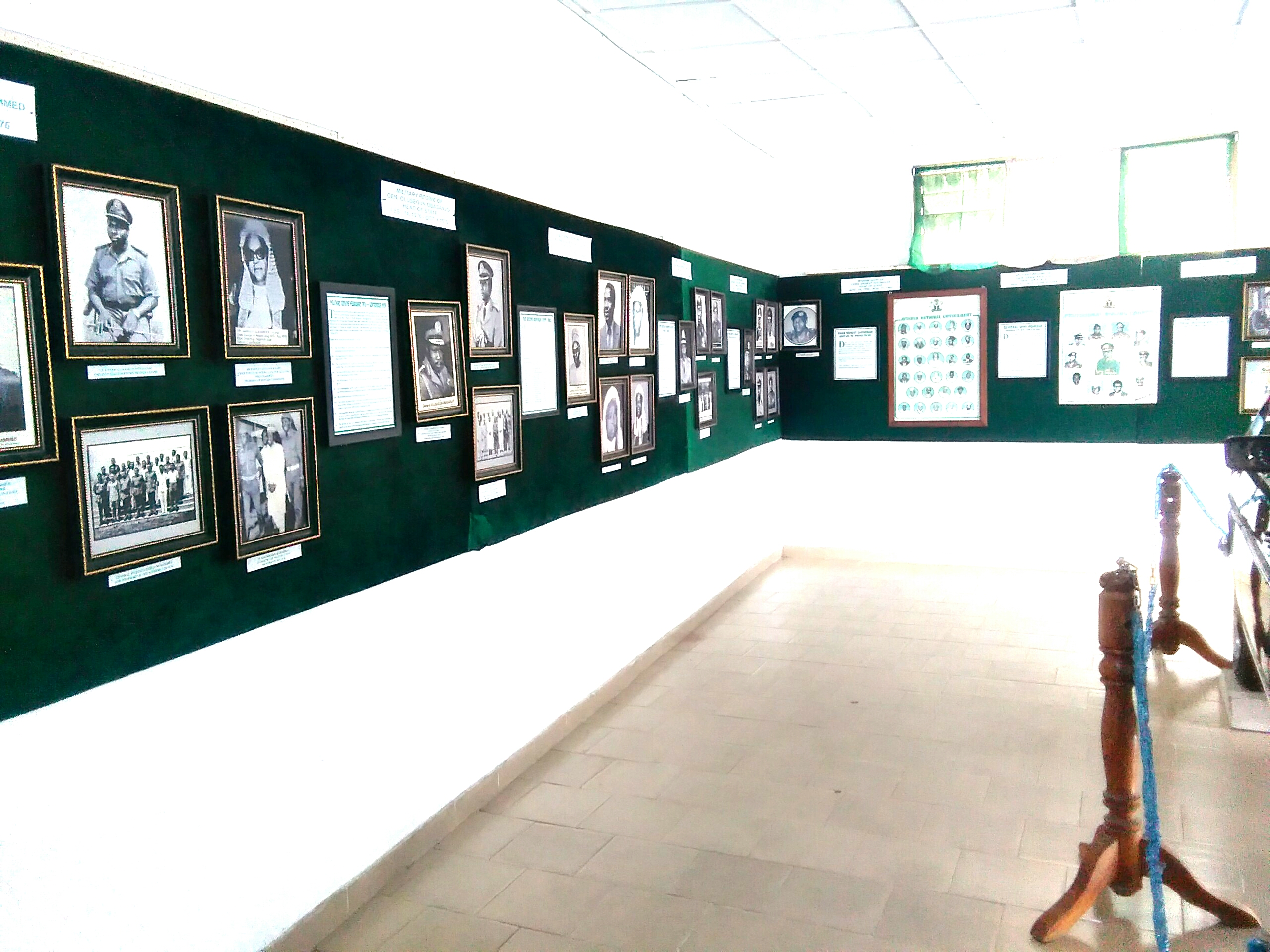

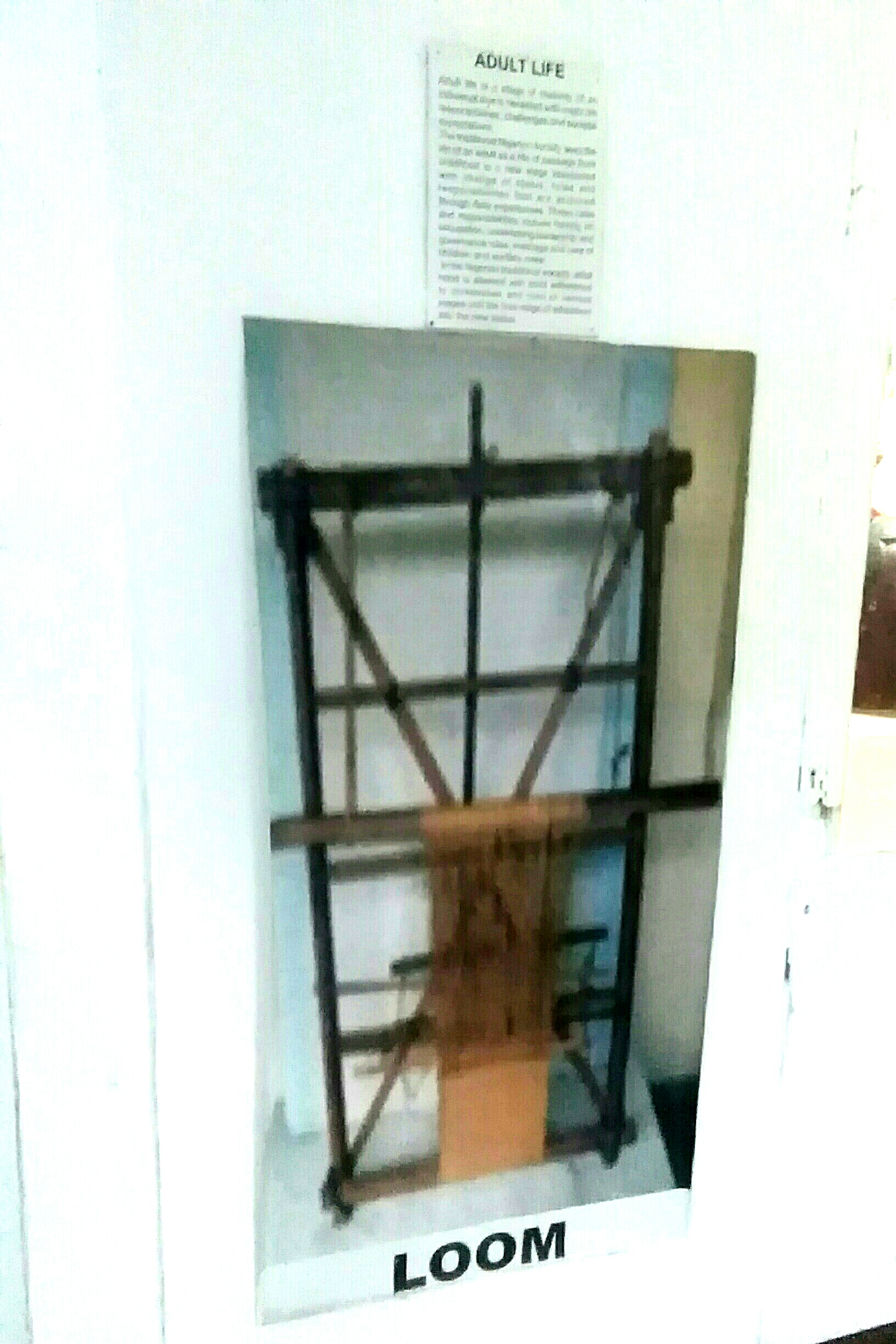

== See also ==
- Bookshop House
