= H. J. R. Murray =

British chess historian (1868–1955)

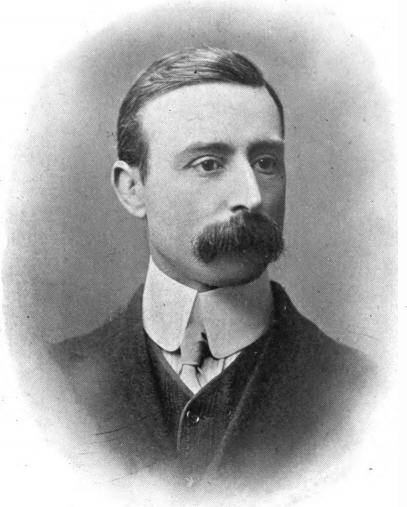
- Murray in 1907
- Born: Harold James Ruthven Murray; 24 June 1868; Peckham, London, England
- Died: 16 May 1955 (aged 86); England
- Education: Mill Hill; Balliol College
- Spouse: Kate Crosthwaite (m. 1897)
- Children: Elisabeth and Kenneth
- Relatives: James Murray (father)

Harold James Ruthven Murray (24 June 1868 – 16 May 1955) was a British educationalist, inspector of schools, and prominent chess historian. His book, A History of Chess, is widely regarded as the most authoritative and comprehensive history of the game.

== Early life and education ==
Murray, the eldest of eleven children, was born near Peckham Rye in Peckham, London. The son of Sir James Murray, the first editor of the Oxford English Dictionary, he attended school at Mill Hill and, in his spare time, helped his father produce the first edition of the OED. By the time Harold had finished school and was preparing to leave for university, he had produced over 27,000 quotations that later appeared in the OED.

He won a place at Balliol College, Oxford where in 1890 he graduated with a first class degree in mathematics. He became an assistant master at Queen's College, Taunton where he learned to play chess. Later he was assistant master at Carlisle Grammar School, and in 1896 became headmaster of Ormskirk Grammar School in Lancashire. On 4 January 1897, he married Kate Maitland Crosthwaite. In 1901, he was appointed a school inspector, and in 1928 he became a member of the Board of Education.

Murray was a champion of the left-handed, defending children against the attempts of schools to make them conform by using their right hands.

== A History of Chess ==
In 1897, Murray was encouraged by Baron von der Lasa (who had just completed his book on the history of European chess) to research the history of chess. Murray gained access to the largest chess library in the world, that of John G. White of Cleveland, Ohio, and also used the collection of J. W. Rimington Wilson in England. The White collection contained some Arabic manuscripts, so Murray learned Arabic, and German. The research took him 13 years, during which time he contributed articles on aspects of chess history to the British Chess Magazine and the Deutsches Wochenschach. In 1913 he published A History of Chess, proposing the theory that chess originated in India. This remains the most widely accepted theory. (See Origins of chess.)

Although A History of Chess was recognised as the standard reference on the subject, its scholarly approach and great length (900 pages) made it inaccessible to most chess players. Murray began a shorter work on chess history written in a more popular style; it remained unfinished at his death and was completed by B. Goulding Brown and Harry Golombek and published in 1963 as A Short History of Chess.

Murray was the father of educationalist and biographer K. M. Elisabeth Murray and the archaeologist Kenneth Murray.

== Other areas of research ==
In 1952 Murray published A History of Board Games other than Chess. His work there on other games has received some criticism. Notably, he was skeptical of the consensus history of the game Go; he wrote that weiqi (the Chinese term for Go) dated to 1000 AD at the earliest, and wrote that Chinese historians had exaggerated the antiquity of the game as well as their inventions in general. Historians of Go have not agreed with Murray's eccentric position; archaeological evidence (some of it post-dating Murray's work, in fairness) exists of weiqi boards from 200 AD as well as pictures of a Go player dated to around 750 AD, as does background evidence of recorded stories, anecdotes, manuals, and so on that all date long before 1000 AD.

A History of Board Games Other Than Chess has been nonetheless praised as the first attempt to develop a "scheme for the classification of board games".

== Bibliography ==
=== Published works ===
- A History of Chess (London: Oxford University Press, 1913)
  - A History of Chess (Northampton, MA: Benjamin Press, 1985) ISBN 0-936317-01-9
  - A History of Chess (New York: Skyhorse Publishing, 2012, paperback reprint of the 1913 edition) ISBN 978-1-62087-062-4
- A History of Board Games other than Chess (1952) ISBN 9780198274018
- A Short History of Chess (1963, posthumously) OCLC 906120511

=== Unpublished works ===
- The Dilaram Arrangement
- The Dilaram position in European Chess
- A History of Draughts
- A History of Heyshott
- The Early History of the Knight's Tour
- The Knight's Problem
- The Classification of Knight's Tours

Most of his unpublished works are held in the Bodleian Libraries of Oxford University.
