= A History of Chess =

1913 book by H. J. R. Murray

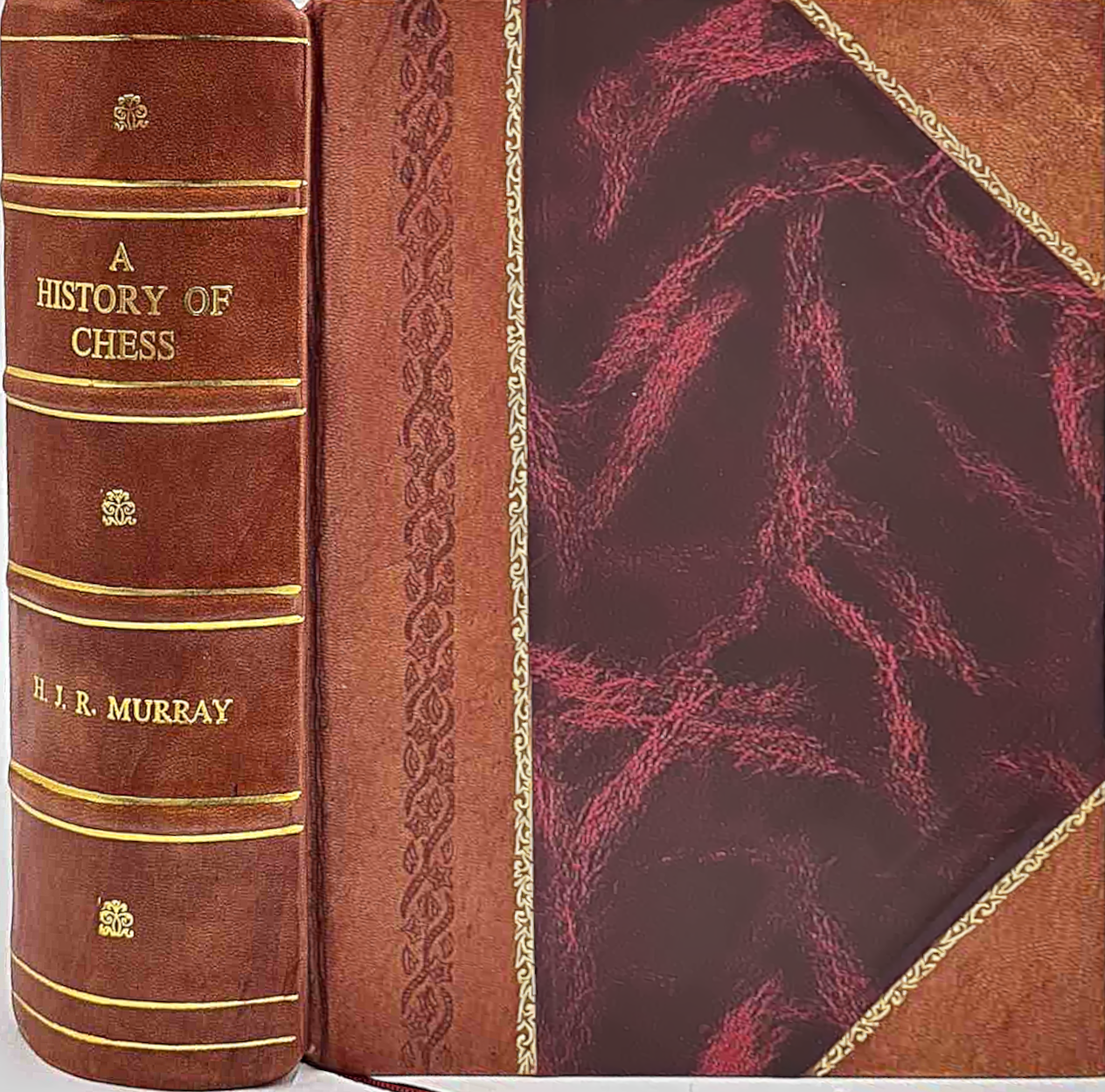
- Author: H. J. R. Murray
- Original title: A History of Chess
- Language: English
- Subject: Chess
- Published: 1913
- Publisher: Clarendon Press

A History of Chess is a book written by H. J. R. Murray (1868–1955) and published in 1913.

== Details ==
Murray's aim is threefold: to present as complete a record as is possible of the varieties of chess that exist or have existed in different parts of the world; to investigate the ultimate origin of these games and the circumstances of the invention of chess; and to trace the development of the modern European game from the first appearance of its ancestor, the Indian chaturanga, in the beginning of the 7th century.

The first part of the book describes the history of the Asiatic varieties of chess, the Arabic and Persian literature on chess, and the theory and practice of the game of shatranj. The second part is concerned with chess in Europe in the Middle Ages, its role in literature and in the moralities, and with medieval chess problems, leading up to the beginning of modern chess and the history of the modern game through to the 19th century.

Murray, who knew the English and German languages, taught himself Arabic to read chess documents. By collating sources and eliminating duplicates therein he lists 553 complete Islamic shatranj chess problems and their stated solutions, plus 16 mikhāriq ("puzzles", singular mikhrāq) (which he numbers RW29 and 554 to 568). During this, he was caused extra work by finding that one of his Arabic-language source documents was descended from a predecessor whose pages had been shuffled and some pages lost, which was then copied by another scribe in old times.

The book also contains a list of medieval European chess problems.

As some chess variants do not use an 8×8 board, he uses the algebraic notation to represent chess moves, but:

- He represents a capture by piece × piece, not piece × square.
- He writes P at the start of a pawn move.

He quotes lengths of text from older European sources untranslated from their original languages (medieval forms of French and German and Spanish etc.).

== Other books ==
Murray's companion work was A History of Board-Games other than Chess ISBN 0-19-827401-7. He also wrote a new history of the game from its beginnings until 1866, called A Short History of Chess. This was found among the papers left behind at his death in 1955, and was published, with contributions by B. Goulding Brown and Harry Golombek, in 1963.

== Impact ==
In the words of Daniel E. O'Sullivan,

Two texts, one medieval and one modern, pervade any discussion of medieval chess and culture. [...] the modern text that resurfaces time and again is H. J. R. Murray's A History of Chess. Chess histories and commentaries are myriad, but no single volume has stood the test of time better than Murray's magnum opus. As Marilyn Yalom writes in the very first endnote of Birth of the Chess Queen: A History,

Murray's 900-page book constitutes the Bible of chess historians. With his knowledge of numerous languages including Latin and Arabic, and his devotion to chess world-wide, H. J. R. Murray was one of those late Victorian giants whose intimidating figure seems to have inhibited further research for the next two generations.

[...] So compendious is the work that it may never be supplanted as the standard history of the game, even if many would like to see it superseded, for doing so would require at least a lifetime of scholarly effort, if not a team of scholars to work one or two decades in close collaboration. [...] In the twentieth century, chess histories have appeared and updated Murray's work, but none have come close to Murray's comprehensiveness.

David Shenk writes in The Immortal Game:

A History of Chess, by Harold James Ruthven Murray, was published by Oxford University Press in 1913. Murray covered the first 1,400 years of the game's history in crystallized, definitive detail. It was Murray who [...] exhaustively collected and interpreted virtually everything there was to know about the game at that time. [...] no one could seriously imagine chess history without it, or easily conceive of what its pioneer author went through to compile it.

== Printing data ==
- Murray, H. J. R. A History of Chess (London: Oxford University Press, 1913)
- Murray, H. J. R. A History of Chess (Northampton, MA: Benjamin Press, 1985) ISBN 0-936317-01-9
- Murray, H. J. R. A History of Chess (New York: Skyhorse Publishing, 2012, paperback reprint of the 1913 edition) ISBN 978-1-62087-062-4
