= Elisabeth Murray =

English biographer and educationist

Elisabeth Murray FRHistS FSA
- Born: Katherine Maud Elisabeth Murray; 3 December 1909; Trumpington, Cambridgeshire, England
- Died: 6 February 1998 (aged 88); West Lavington, West Sussex, England
- Citizenship: United Kingdom
- Education: Edgbaston High School; St Paul's Girls School; Colchester County High School
- Alma mater: Somerville College, Oxford
- Occupations: Biographer; Educationist
- Years active: 1950–1998
- Father: H. J. R. Murray
- Relatives: James Murray (paternal grandfather); Kenneth Murray (brother)

Katherine Maud Elisabeth Murray FRHistS FSA (3 December 1909 – 6 February 1998) was an English biographer and educationist. She began as an archaeological and historical researcher before accepting an invitation to become a librarian at Ashburne Hall, University of Manchester in 1935. Murray went on to become assistant tutor and registrar at Girton College, Cambridge from 1938 to 1948. From May 1948 to 1970, she was principal of Bishop Otter College in Chichester, West Sussex, overseeing an extensive construction program and introducing co-education to the college. Murray was chair of the council and later president of the Sussex Archaeological Society and published a biography of her paternal grandfather James Murray in 1978. After her death, she left gifts to several organisations in her will.

== Early life ==
Murray was born on 3 December 1909, at Seatoller, 3 Hills Road, Trumpington, near Cambridge. She was the third child of the inspector of schools and author H. J. R. Murray and his wife, Kate Maitland, née Crosthwaite, an amateur violinist and women's suffragette participant. Murray's maternal grandfather was James Murray, the lexicographer. She had two brothers, one of whom was the archaeologist Kenneth Murray; she was strongly influenced by both her siblings. Murray was educated at three schools because her father moved around: Edgbaston High School, Birmingham, St Paul's Girls' School, London and Colchester County High School; she became interested in archaeology at Colchester.

In 1928, she was accepted to read modern history at Somerville College, Oxford, and graduated with a Bachelor of Arts degree in 1931. Murray embarked on archaeological and historical research, and was elected to study a Bachelor of Letters degree with the Rosa Hovey research scholarship. She graduated in 1933 with the thesis The Constitutional History of the Cinque Ports, which was published two years later.

== Career ==
Murray thought about a career as a factory inspector but was strongly attracted to academia. During this period, she was chair of the Oxford University Archaeological Society and won a Mond scholarship to work with the Samaria excavation expedition in 1933, specially the Ahab's Palace. Murray spent 1935 to 1937 working in an administrative role as a librarian and tutor on the women's hall of residence at Ashburne Hall, University of Manchester. In 1938, she was invited to work at Girton College, Cambridge and was appointed assistant tutor in charge of student welfare and registrar. Four years later, Murray was promoted to domestic bursar followed by the role of junior bursar from 1944 to 1948. She was on the Special Purposes Committee responsible for a plethora of the daily organisation and domestic staff.

In 1948, Murray was offered the role of Principal of Bishop Otter College, an Anglican college in Chichester, West Sussex. She began in the role in May that year, following a 13 to 5 vote by council members despite concerns about her lack of professional expertise and the attitude she displayed at her interview. Murray began a three-year course at the college and introduced male students to the all-female institution. She oversaw an extensive construction programme, which introduced a new assembly hall, a chapel on the former kitchen garden, a dining hall, teaching rooms and individual student bedrooms in place of the dormitory accommodation. Murray purchased sculptures and pictures from the likes of Henry Moore, Stanley Spencer and Graham Sutherland, and invited national figures to speak to staff and students at the college. She also introduced co-education, instituted responsibility for self-appraisal in student matters and grew the college's governing body.

By the time of Murray's retirement in 1970, the college had grown in size in terms of student numbers training at all levels. In retirement, she accessed the papers of her grandfather James Murray and prepared a biography of him Caught in the Web of Words, which was published in 1977 and received critical praise from general readers and scholars in the United Kingdom and the United States. The book won Murray the British Academy's Rose Mary Crawshay Prize for English Literature and honorary degrees from the University of Sussex and the United States. She was an independent Councillor on Chichester District Council from 1973 to 1987, and was vice-chair of its planning committee from 1976. Murray was chair of the council at the Sussex Archaeological Society from 1964 to 1977, and served as president between 1977 and 1980. She helped to organise excavations at Bignor and Fishbourne Roman Palace. Murray helped to establish Pallant House Gallery, was a fellow of the Royal Historical Society and the Society of Antiquaries, served on the Sussex Historic Churches Trust and the Society of Sussex Downsmen.

== Personal life ==
She was a member of the Church of England. Murray died of bronchopneumonia at the Pendean Nursing Home, West Lavington, West Sussex close to Midhurst on 6 February 1998. She did not marry. Murray's funeral was held on six days later in Heyshott, Sussex and was cremated in Chichester with her ashes interred in October 1998. On 15 May, a thanksgiving service was held for her at Chichester Cathedral.

== Legacy ==
Murray had a wide circle of friends and was open to many types of individual and the conditions of the people. She was tenacious, vitality and had a sense of enjoyment. In Murray's will, she donated gifts from her estate to Christian Aid, Heyshott Church, Pallant House Gallery, Somerville College and the Sussex Historic Churches Trust.
