= Colchester County High School for Girls =

Location
- Norman Way; Colchester, Essex, CO3 3US; England; 51.8855°N 0.8755°E

Information
- Type: Grammar academy
- Motto: Wisdom Giveth Life
- Established: 1909
- Local authority: Essex County Council
- Specialist: Science and Languages
- Department for Education URN: 137515 Tables
- Ofsted: Reports
- Chair of Governors: Laurence Jones
- Headteacher: Gillian Marshall
- Gender: Girls
- Age: 11 to 18
- Enrolment: 874
- Website: http://www.cchsg.com/

Colchester County High School for Girls is a selective girls' grammar school with academy status in Colchester, Essex. The school consistently scores highly in the league tables for the UK. It was joint first in the country in the 2018 secondary GCSE league tables, and ninth in the country in the 2015 A-Level league tables. Entrance to Year 7 is by an academic selection test, the Eleven Plus. Entrance into Year 12 is by GCSE grades, although priority is given to pre-existing pupils.

== History ==
The school was originally located in the Albert Hall in the High Street (now the Co-operative Bank), until its intended premises at the top of North Hill (now the Sixth Form College) were completed. Later, the lower school moved to Greyfriars on East Hill and, in 1957, moved to new buildings in Norman Way, off Lexden Road. Most of the buildings are unchanged, but an extension, including new science laboratories and Sixth Form facilities was added in 2002. The 'mSchool' was added between 2006 and 2009, with new facilities for music, mathematics and the mind; its 'iLab' (innovation laboratory) is one of the few in the UK outside a university.

In 2018 new classrooms, including a new healthy living studio; a new sixth form centre with a lecture theatre and an IT suite were completed;In 2017, the top floor of the science block, or 'S-block’, was refurbished to facilitate the Colchester Teacher Training Consortium (CTTC).

It was founded in 1909 as a girls' school for Colchester, and subsequently became a grammar school admitting girls from North East Essex and beyond on the basis of an 11+ selection test. The school is situated a mile to the west of central Colchester, and celebrated its centenary in 2009–2010.

== Specialisms ==
The school was one of the first Science Specialist Schools in the country. It later became a specialist Modern Language school too, teaching French and German as well as Latin.

== School motto ==
Wisdom Giveth Life has been the school's motto since the school opened in 1909. This reading was previously included in the traditional school assembly at the start of each academic year:

Wisdom is good with an inheritance: and by it there is profit to them that see the sun.
For Wisdom is a defence, and money is a defence: but the excellency of knowledge is, that wisdom giveth life to them that have it.
Consider the work of God: for who can make that straight, which he hath made crooked?

In the day of prosperity be joyful, but in the days of adversity consider: God also hath set the one over against the other, to the end that man should find nothing after him.

— -Ecclesiastes, chapter 7, verses 11–14

== Notable alumni ==
- Charlotte Atkins – MP for Staffordshire Moorlands
- Fiona Bevan – singer/songwriter
- Pamela Brown – writer
- Georgina Cates – actor (born Clare Woodgate)
- Beth Chatto – gardener
- Saskia Clark – GB Olympic Gold Medal Winning Sailor
- Stella Creasy – MP for Walthamstow
- Virginia Crosbie – MP for Ynys Môn
- Christine Davies – Professor of Physics at the University of Glasgow
- Helen Mary Jones – member for Llanelli of National Assembly for Wales
- Elisabeth Murray – English biographer and educationist
- Elizabeth Cooper – textile artist and crochet designer
- Laura Stephens – Olympic swimmer
