= Christine Davies =

British physicist (born 1959)

Christine Davies OBE FRSE FInstP
- Born: Christine Tullis Hunter Davies; 1959 (age 66–67); Clacton-on-Sea, England
- Education: Colchester County High School for Girls; University of Cambridge (BA, PhD)
- Awards: Rosalind Franklin Award (2005); Royal Society Wolfson Research Merit Award (2012)
- Scientific career
- Fields: Theoretical particle physics
- Workplaces: CERN; Cornell University; Ohio State University; University of Glasgow; University of California at Santa Barbara
- Thesis: Quantum chromodynamics and the Drell-Yan Process (1984)
- Doctoral advisor: Bryan Webber
- Website: www.physics.gla.ac.uk/~cdavies

Christine Tullis Hunter Davies (born 1959) OBE FRSE FInstP is a professor of physics at the University of Glasgow.

== Education ==
Davies attended Colchester County High School for Girls, then the University of Cambridge, where she was an undergraduate student of Churchill College, Cambridge. She received a Bachelor of Arts (BA) degree in 1981 in physics with theoretical physics, followed by a PhD in 1984 for research on quantum chromodynamics (QCD) and the Drell–Yan process while working in the Cavendish Laboratory in Cambridge.

== Research and career ==
Davies' research investigates the strong interaction and the solution of quantum chromodynamics using a numerical method known as Lattice QCD.

She has held academic appointments at the University of Glasgow, CERN, Cornell University, Ohio State University and the University of California at Santa Barbara. Her research has been funded by the Science and Technology Facilities Council (STFC), the Particle Physics and Astronomy Research Council (PPARC), the Leverhulme Trust, Royal Society and the Fulbright Program.

She chairs the project management board for the Distributed Research utilising Advanced Computing (DiRAC) High Performance Computing (HPC) facility, is a member of the STFC particle physics advisory panel and serves as an external examiner for the School of Physics and Astronomy at the University of Manchester.

=== Awards and honours ===
She was appointed Order of the British Empire (OBE) in the 2006 Birthday Honours for services to science, elected a Fellow of the Royal Society of Edinburgh (FRSE) in 2001, and has been a Fellow of the Institute of Physics (FInstP) since 1988. She received the Rosalind Franklin Award in 2005 and a Royal Society Wolfson Research Merit Award in 2012.
