= Male Warrior Figure (LNB Industry) =

Bronze

Figure: Male Warrior
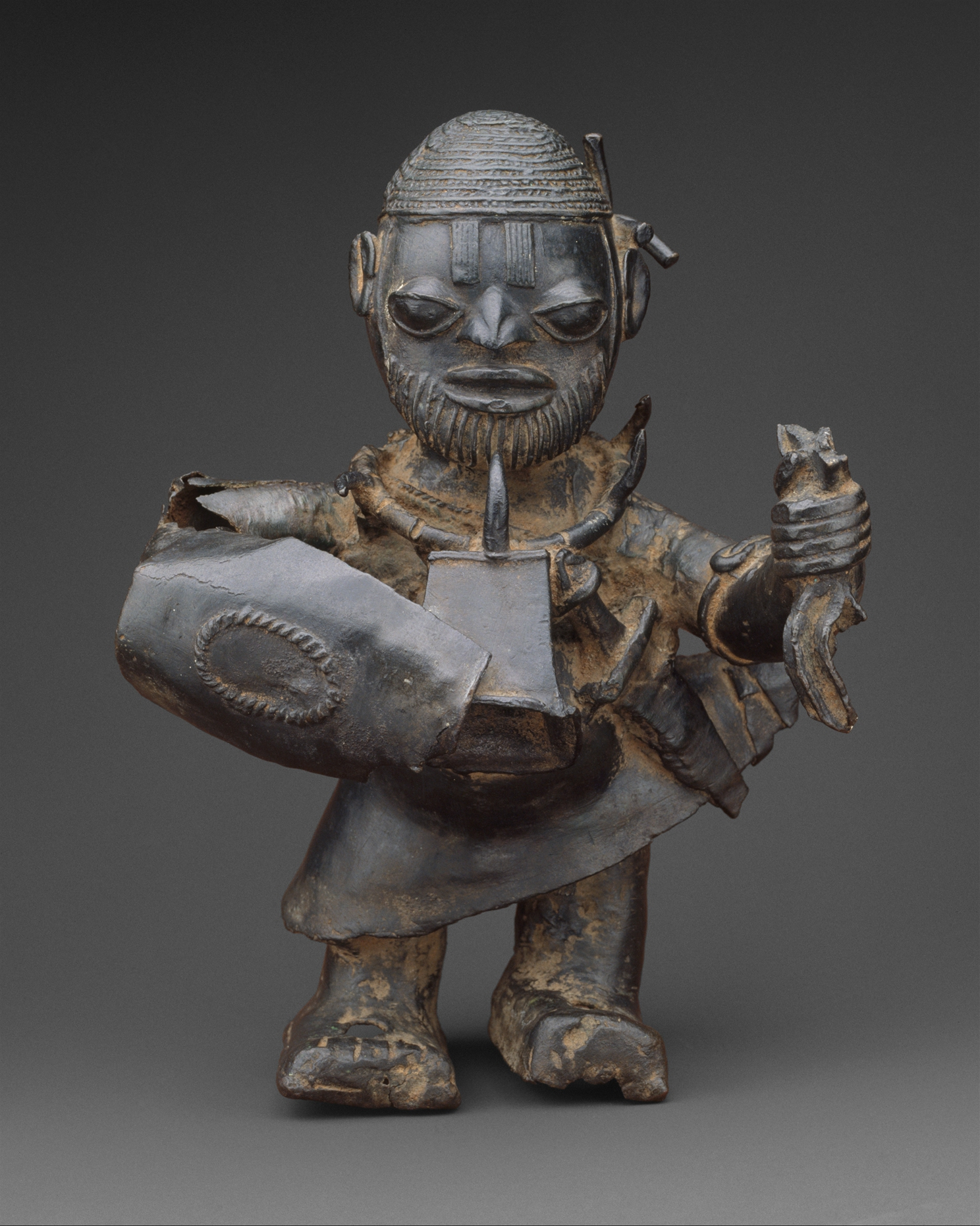
- The figure, which is currently kept in the MET.
- Material: Brass, Clay, Teeth, Glass Beads.
- Size: height: 31.8 cm (12.5 in) width: 22.2cm (8.75 in) depth: 17.1 cm (6.75 in)
- Created: 15th/16th century
- Present location: MET, New York
- Registration: 1977.173
- Culture: Lower Niger Bronze Industries

This depiction of a standing warrior belongs to a Lower Niger Bronze Industry. He stands, wearing an asymmetrical skirt, a leopard's-tooth necklace and a Bell necklace, which would have intimidated enemies and protected the wearer in combat. His left hand wraps around a (now broken) sword, his right carries a rectilinear shield; holes in the center and heel of his feet indicate he may have originally been connected to a larger structure; the top of his face bears marks of Scarification, and he additionally wears a bead cap and necklace.

== Cultural Origins ==
Though his garb is clearly similar to that worn by Benin warriors depicted in the famous Benin Bronzes, the style of this piece (such as the "vigorous" gestures and upward-sweeping loincloth) are uncommon in Benin art. This, combined with the "rustic" style suggest it belongs to a separate artistic tradition, which is currently grouped with the "basket" Lower Niger Bronze Industries, perhaps also indicating the widespread nature of such cultural traits; it is tentatively suggested to belong to a hybrid Yoruba-Benin culture. The piece is cast bronze.

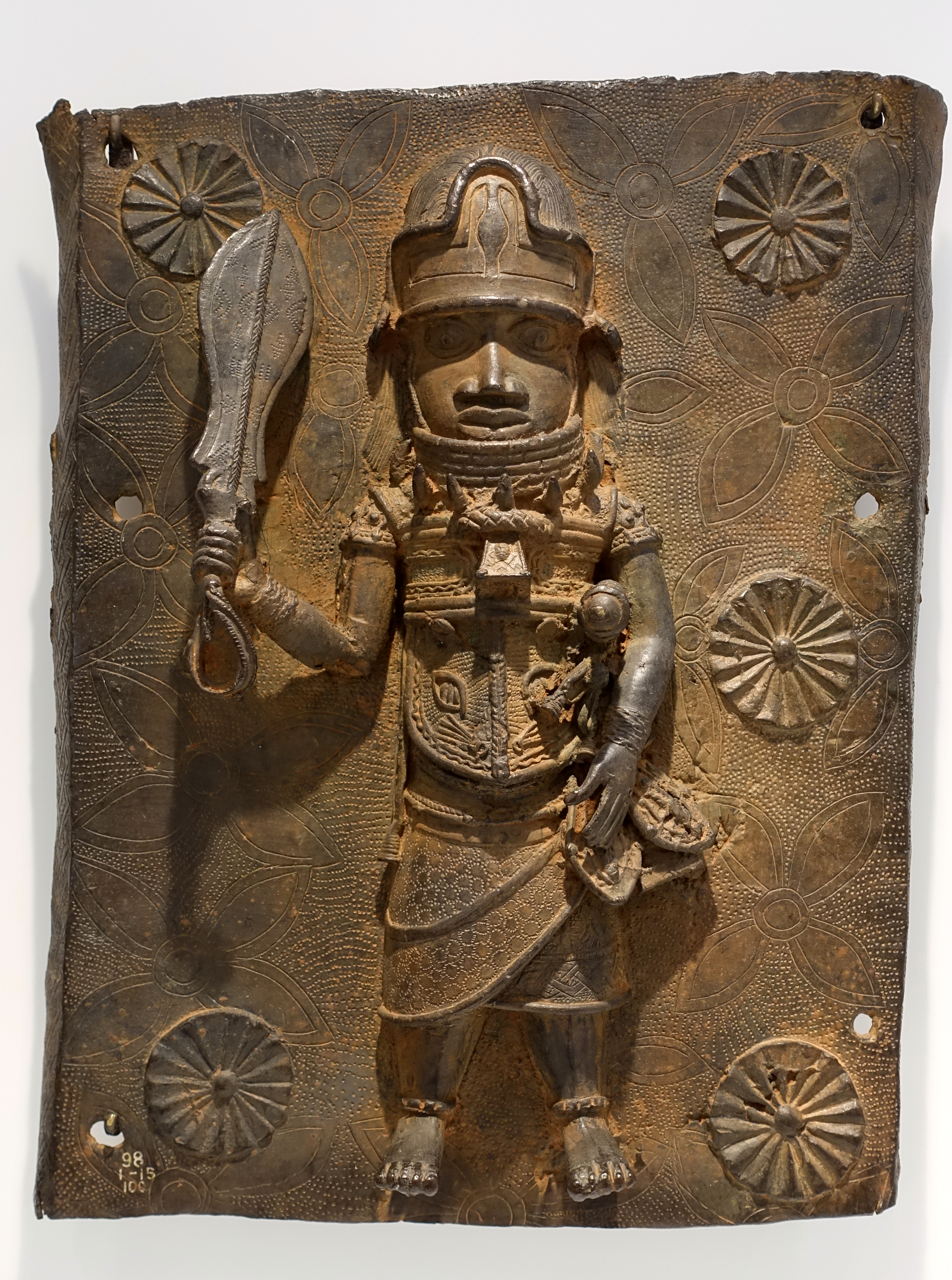
Benin Bronze, kept in Dallas Museum of Art, depicting a similarly clad soldier.

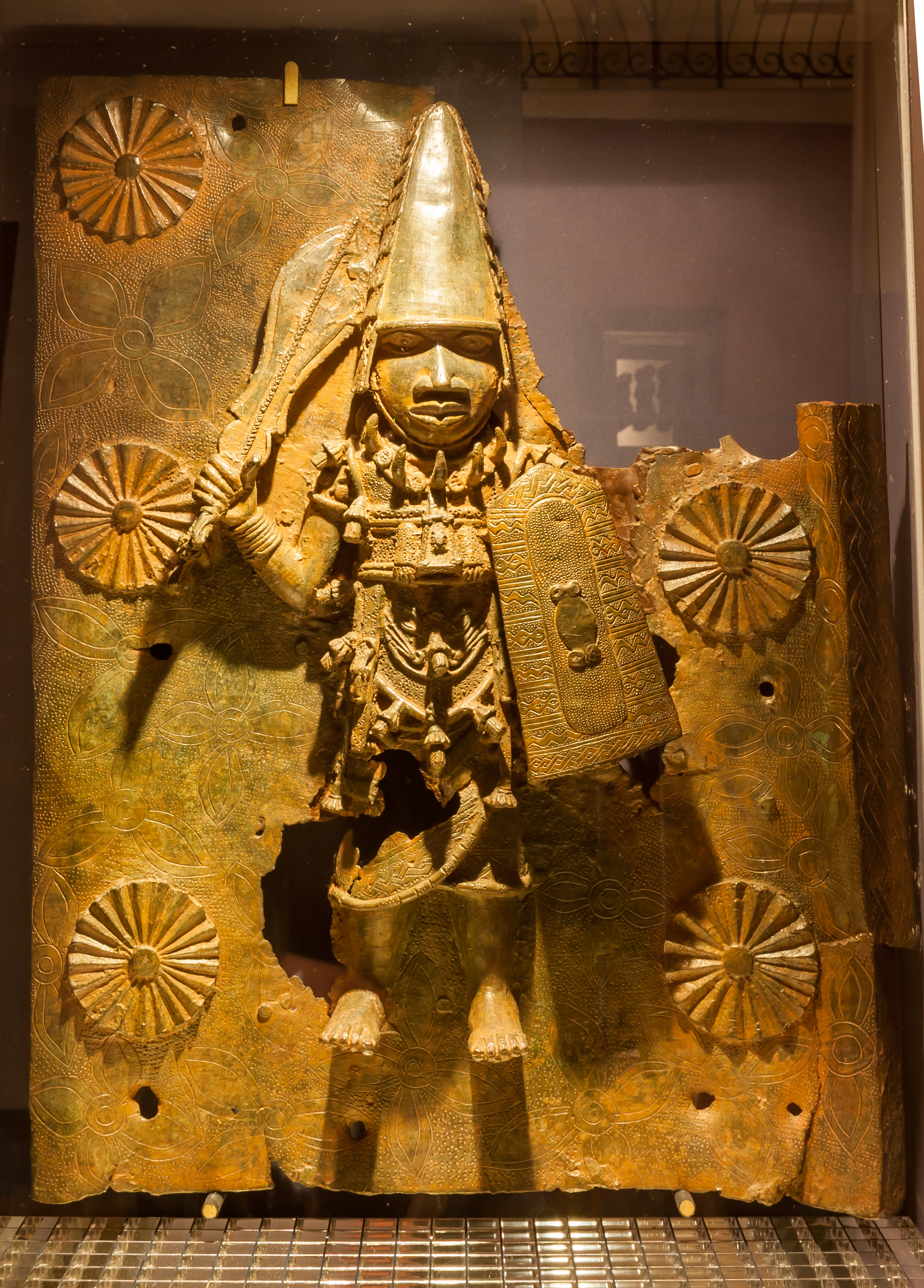
Benin Bronze, kept in Horniman Museum, depicting a warrior with similar though also quite distinct garments, and pose.

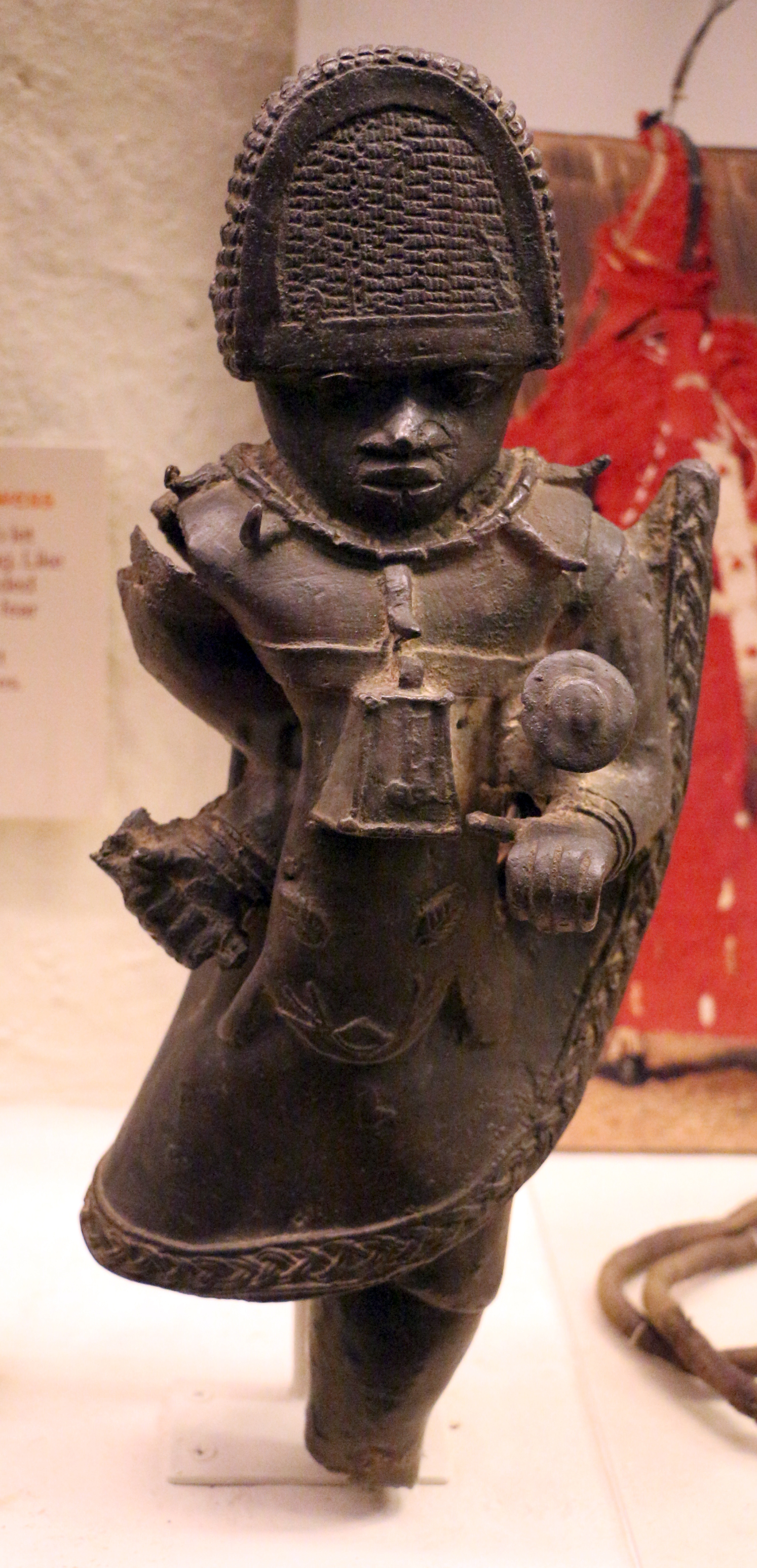
Benin Bronze Sculpture kept in African art in the Field Museum of Natural History with warrior bearing similar garb.

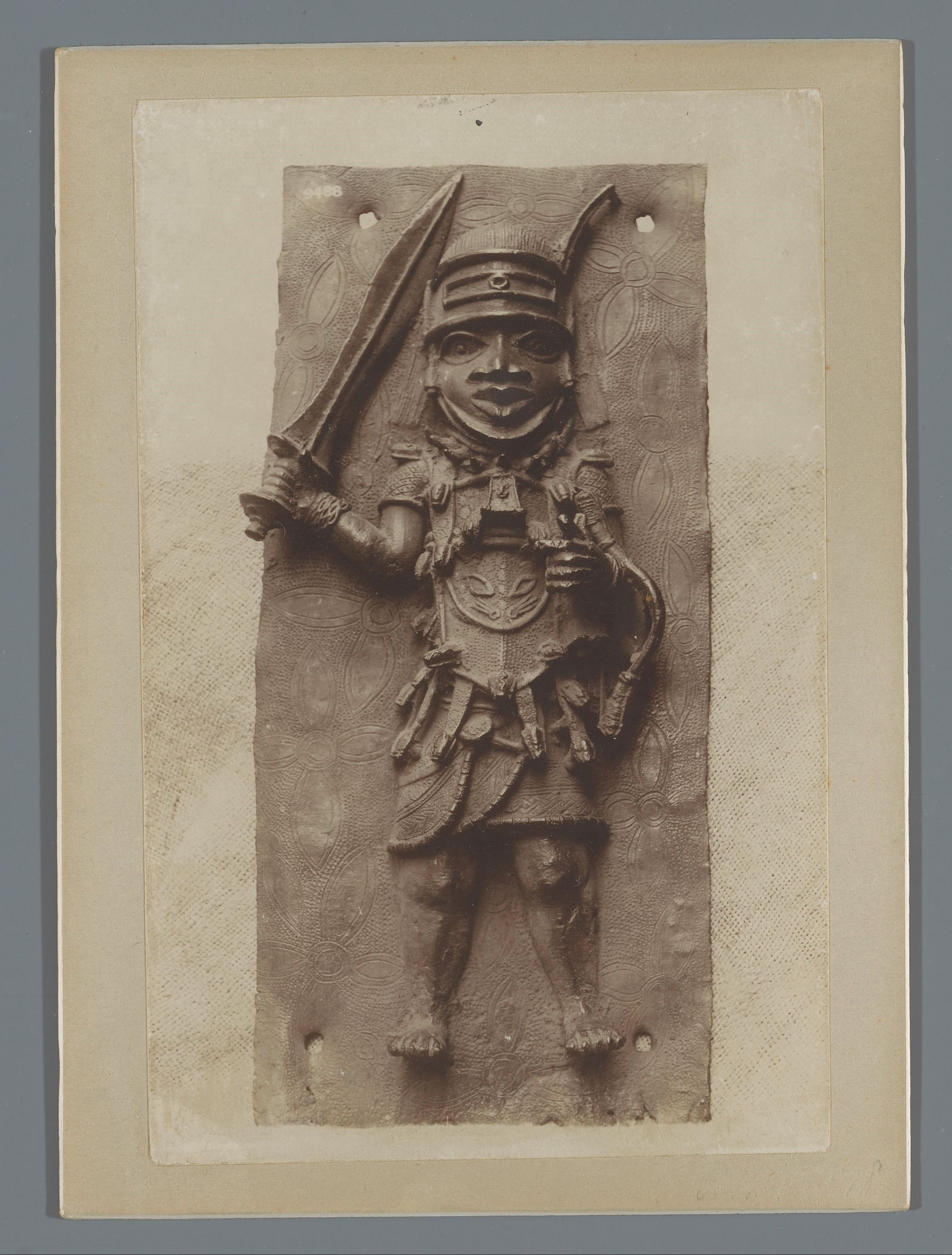

== Lower Niger Bronze Industries ==
The Lower Niger Bronze Industries encompass the works produced by multiple distinct cultural traditions, bound primarily by geographic location in the Lower Niger.
