= Kenneth Murray (archaeologist) =

English art curator & teacher (1902–1972)

K. C. Murray OBE
- Born: Kenneth Crosswaithe Murray; 1 Aug 1902; Staffordshire, England
- Died: 21 April 1972; Benin, Nigeria
- Education: Balliol College, Oxford; School of Arts and Crafts, Birmingham
- Occupations: Teacher, Curator
- Father: H. J. R. Murray
- Relatives: James Murray (paternal grandfather); Elisabeth Murray (sister)

Kenneth Crosswaithe Murray (1902 – 21 April 1972), better known as K. C. Murray, was an English art curator and teacher.

The second son of the chess historian H. J. R. Murray and his suffragette wife Kate Crosthwaite, Murray was an elder brother of educationalist and biographer Elisabeth Murray, and a grandson of Sir James Murray, editor of the Oxford English Dictionary.

He first studied at Balliol College, Oxford but later left in order to study art at the School of Arts and Crafts, Birmingham.

Arriving in Lagos, Nigeria on 14 December 1927 he undertook book illustrations in Oyo, Oyo (south west Nigeria) and inspections of the Arts and Crafts Schools in Kano and Katsina before returning to Lagos in January 1928 to teach arts at Kings College, Queen's College, and the Government School.

Murray took a leave in 1929 to study pottery under Britain’s preeminent studio potter, Bernard Leach. He returned to Nigeria to teach arts at Government Training College Umuahia until 1931 when he moved to Government Training College Ibadan.

Prompted by the discovery of Nok Head artefacts during tin mining , on 28 July 1943, Murray became Nigeria's first surveyor of antiquities in the newly created Nigeria Antiquities Service (which became the Nigerian National Commission for Museums and Monuments in 1979). During his tenure as the director of the Department of Antiquities of the colonial administration he founded the Nigerian Museum in Lagos in 1957. He was succeeded as Director by Bernard Fagg. He retired to his house in Takwa Bay Lagos, but was later recalled temporarily in 1963 to his former position until a Nigeria could take over.

Having spent the majority of his adult life in Nigeria, remained in Nigeria even after retirement and was dedicated to preserving Nigerian arts. KC Murray died in a road accident along Ijebu Benin road on 21 April 1972. His body was interred in Ikoyi Cemetery on 4 May 1972.

== Sources ==
- Willett, Frank (Winter 1973). "Kenneth Murray". African Arts. 6 (2): 65. doi:10.2307/3334793. JSTOR 3334783.
- Onuzulike, Ozioma (November 2013). "The Emergence of Modern Ceramics in Nigeria: The Kenneth Murray Decade, 1929–39". The Journal of Modern Craft. 6 (3): 293–313. doi:10.2752/174967813X13806265666735.
