= Dakodonou =

King of Dahomey (r. c. 1620–1645)

Dakodonu
- King of Dahomey
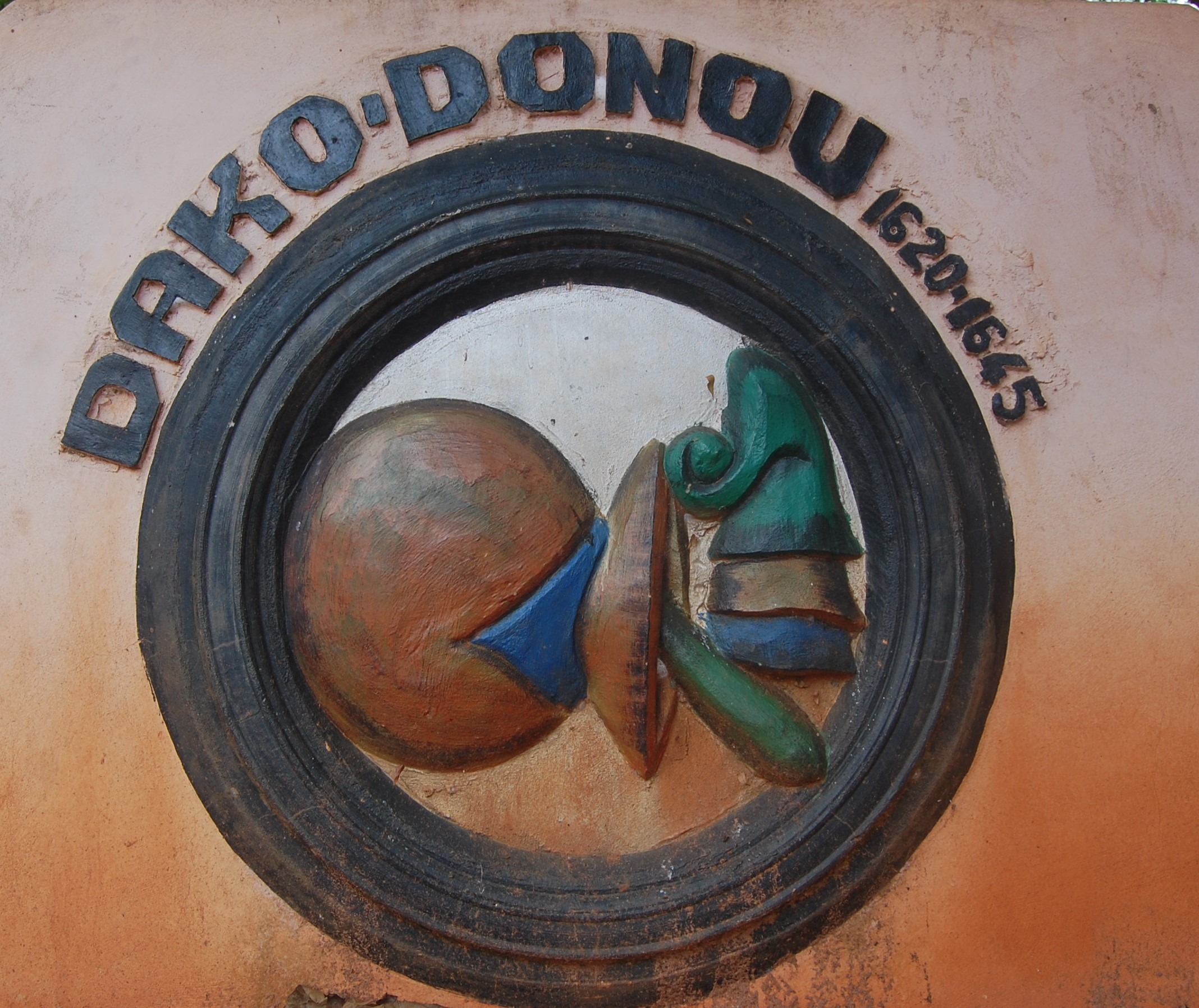
- Symbol of Dako Donou's jar of indigo and war club on the wall of Place Goho in Abomey in Benin in 2020
- Reign: c.1620–c.1645
- Predecessor: Do-Aklin
- Successor: Houegbadja
- Died: 1645
- House: Aladaxonou

Dakodonou, Dakodonu, Dako Donu or Dako Danzo was an early king of the Kingdom of Dahomey, in present-day Benin, ruling from around 1620 until 1645. Oral tradition recounts that Dakodonu was the son (or grandson) of Do-Aklin, the founder of the royal dynasty of Dahomey, and the father to Houegbadja, often considered the founder of the Kingdom of Dahomey. In addition, it is said that Dakodonu killed a local chieftain and founded the capital city upon the site. However, some recent historical analysis contends that Dakodonu was added into the royal line in the 18th century to legitimize the ruling dynasty over the indigenous inhabitants of the Abomey plateau.

== Name ==
One legend tells that Dakodonou's original name was Dako but he adopted his new name Dakodonou after killing Donou (who was either a farmer or an indigo painter) in a pot of indigo and rolling his corpse around its blue tomb.

== Founding of Abomey Kingdom ==
Oral tradition holds that a succession struggle in Allada resulted in Do-Aklin moving a large population onto the Abomey plateau, an area settled by the Gedevi people. When Do-Aklin died (or in some versions was deposed), Dakodonu became the leader of the group and was given permission by the Gedevi chiefs to settle on the plateau. Dakodonu requested additional land for settlement from a prominent Gedevi chief named Dan (or Da). In Gbe languages, Da or Dan means snake . To this request, the chief responded "Should I open up my belly and build you a house in it." The tradition contends that Dakodonu killed Dan on the spot and ordered that his new palace be built on the site and derived the kingdom's name from the incident: Dan=chief, xo=Belly, me=Inside of. From this beginning, Dakodonu began establishing the basic structure of the Dahomey kingdom and is reported to have conquered two additional villages. Oral tradition of the ruling lineage of the kingdom says that Dakodonu's son Houegbadja, often considered the first king of Dahomey, took over after Dakodonu's reign.

== Dakodonu and legitimation of the royal lineage ==
Dahomey historian Edna Bay argues that Dakodonu was actually himself a Gedevi, the local population of the area, and that he was added into the royal lineage story by Agaja in order to establish the legitimate rule of the Kingdom over the local population. Evidence of this is suggested through the fact that the head priest of the kingdom, the agasunon in Fon, was always from the lineage of Dakodonu. In addition, oral tradition of lineages not associated with the ruling group claim that Houegbadja was an adopted son of Dakodonu. Dakodonu's inclusion in royal lists then was a means of creating recognition for the local population in a powerful position (the head priest) and legitimating the rule of the Fon kingdom over the territory. In addition, Monroe contends that the story of the founding, the killing of Dan, is likely not based on a single incident and Bay contends that Dahomey meaning In the belly of Dan is likely a false etymology.

== Constructions by Dakodonu ==
As an early king of Dahomey, the reign of Dakodonu coincided with some significant construction projects including the start of the Royal Palaces of Abomey, although the structures were probably replaced by construction by Houegbadja, and Agongointo-Zoungoudo Underground Town.

== See also ==
- Vodun
- History of the Kingdom of Dahomey

Regnal titles
Preceded by Do-Aklin	King of Dahomey; 1620–1645	Succeeded by Houegbadja
