= King of Dahomey =

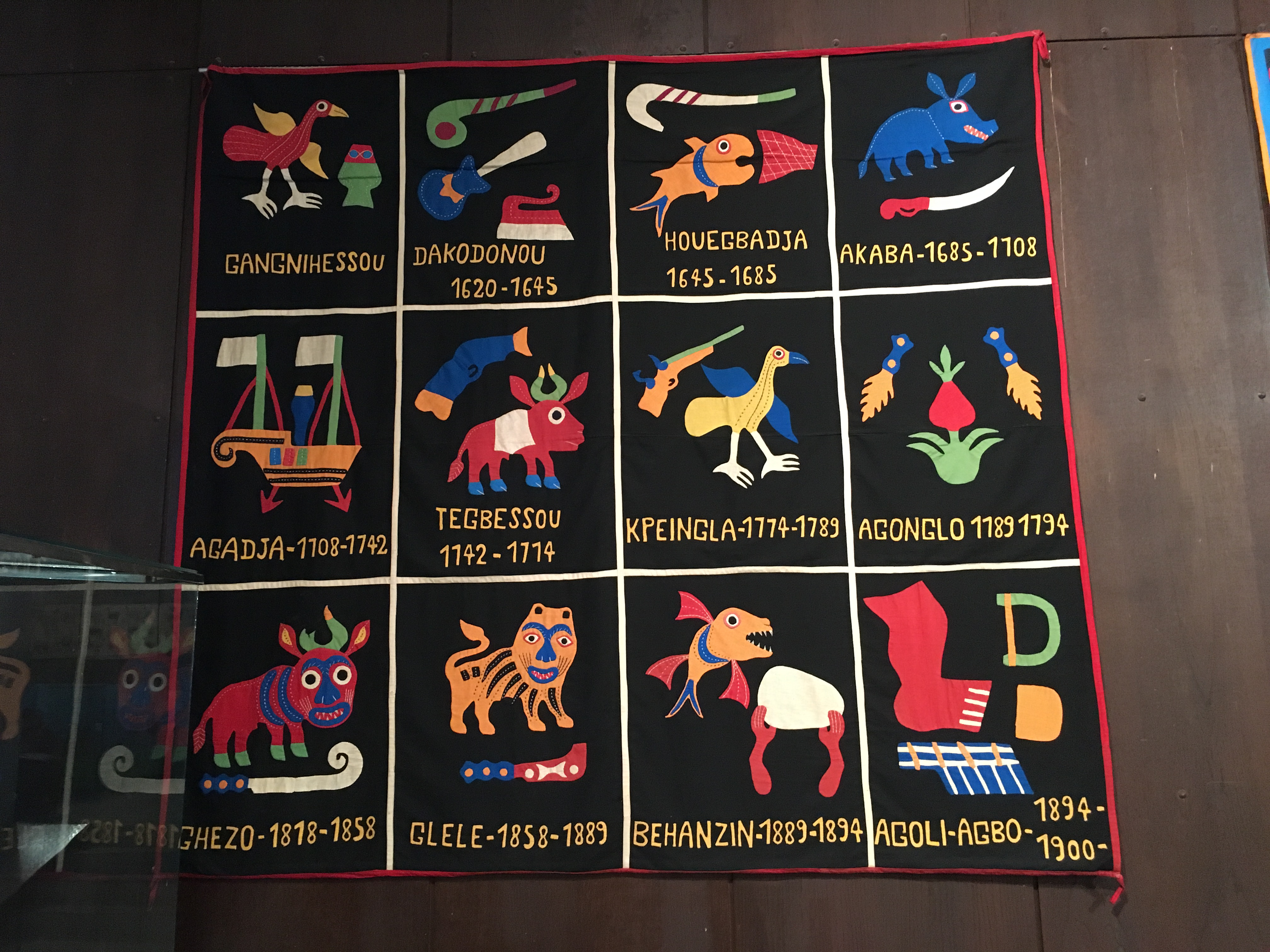
Tapestry depicting several kings of Dahomey and their regnal years.

The King of Dahomey (Fon: Ahosu) was the ruler of Dahomey, a West African kingdom in the southern part of present-day Benin, which lasted from 1600 until 1900 when the French Third Republic abolished the political authority of the Kingdom. The rulers served a prominent position in Fon ancestor worship leading the Annual Customs and this important position caused the French to bring back the exiled king of Dahomey for ceremonial purposes in 1910. Since 2000, there have been rival claimants as king and there has so far been no political solution. The Palace and seat of government were in the town of Abomey. Early historiography of the King of Dahomey presented them as absolute rulers who formally owned all property and people of the kingdom. However, recent histories have emphasized that there was significant political contestation limiting the power of the king and that there was a female ruler of Dahomey, Hangbe, who was largely written out of early histories.

== The first king ==
Multiple lists of the kings of Dahomey have been put together and many of them start at different points for the first King of Dahomey. In various sources, Do-Aklin, Dakodonu, or Houegbadja are all considered the first king of Dahomey. Oral tradition contends that Do-Aklin moved from Allada to the Abomey plateau, Dakodonu created the first settlement and founded the kingdom (but is often considered a "mere chief"), and Houegbadja who settled the kingdom, built the palace and created much of the structure is often considered the first king of Dahomey. Oral tradition contends that the kings were all of the Aladaxonou dynasty, a name claiming descent from the city of Allada which Dahomey conquered in the 1700s. Historians largely believe now that this connection was created to legitimate rule over the city of Allada and that connections to the royal family in Allada were likely of a limited nature. In oral tradition of most accounts, Houegbadja is considered the first king and recognition of him happened first in the Annual Customs of Dahomey.

== List of kings ==
(Dates in italics indicate de facto continuation of office)

Reign	Portrait	King	Notes
Kingdom of Abomey
c. 1600		Do-Aklin or Gangnihessou	Leader of Fon settlement on Abomey Plateau.
c. 1625 to 1645		Dakodonou, Ahosu	Founder of the Kingdom of Abomey and builder of the palace.
Kingdom of Dahomey
1645 to 1685		Houegbadja, Ahosu	In most accounts the first King of Dahomey.
1685 to 1716		Akaba, Ahosu	
1716 to 1718		Hangbe, Queen or Regent	Hangbe was ruler of Dahomey for a short period of time between the death of Akaba and the rule of Agaja. Bay argues that there is clear evidence that suggests Hangbe did rule for a period, but it is unclear whether it was for three months or three years. She is not included in any lists of Kings of Dahomey.
1718 to 1740		Agaja, Ahosu	
1740 to 1774		Tegbesu, Ahosu	
1774 to 1789		Kpengla, Ahosu	
1789 to 1797		Agonglo, Ahosu	
1797 to 1818		Adandozan, Ahosu or Regent	Excluded in some lists.
1818 to 1858		Ghezo, Ahosu	
1858 to 1889		Glele, Ahosu	
1889 to 1894		Béhanzin, Ahosu	Final independent King of Dahomey, reigned during the Franco-Dahomean Wars.
1894 to 1900		Agoli-agbo, Ahosu	Appointed to the position when the French conquered Abomey.
Ceremonial rulers
1900 to 1940		Agoli-agbo, Ahosu	In exile and reigned with French restrictions.
1940 to 1948		Aidododo, Ahosu	
1948 to 1983		Togni-Ahoussou, Ahosu	
1986 to 1989		Joseph Langanfin, Ahosu	
30 September 1989 to July 2018		Agoli Agbo Dedjalagni, Ahosu	Since 2000, Houédogni Béhanzin had made a rival claim to the position of king. Following the death of Agoli Agbo Dedjalagni, there was no titular King of Dahomey for 8 months.
22 January 2000 to 30 December 2012		Houédogni Béhanzin, Ahosu	Rival to Agoli Agbo Dedjalagni for the position of king.
12 January 2019 to 17 December 2021		Dah Sagbadjou Glele, Ahosu	Elected by Dahomeyan nobles.
22 January 2022 to present		Georges Collinet Béhanzin	

== See also ==
- History of the Kingdom of Dahomey
- Royal Palaces of Abomey
- Benin
- Fon
- Fon states
  - Rulers of the Fon state of Alada (Allada)
  - Rulers of the Fon state of Savi Hweda
- Lists of office-holders
