= Dah Sagbadjou Glele =

Dahomey royalty (died 2021)

- King of Dahomey
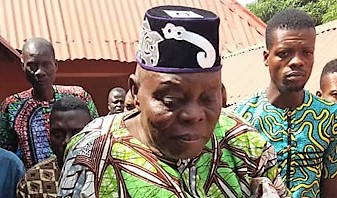
- Reign: 12 January 2019 – 17 December 2021
- Coronation: 12 January 2019
- Predecessor: Agoli Agbo Dedjalagni
- Successor: Georges Collinet Béhanzin
- Born: 1920s–1930s
- Died: 17 December 2021
- House: Aladaxonou

Dada Kêfa Agbomantonligba Sagbadjou Glèlè (died 17 December 2021) was the King of Dahomey from 2019 until his death.

== Early life and accession ==
For most of his life, he worked as a priest. Dah Sagbadjou Glele was elected king by the royal families of Dahomey after his predecessor Agoli Agbo Dedjalagni died aged 84, and became Ahosu or King of Dahomey officially on 12 January 2019. Dah Sagbadjou Glele was appointed king of Dahomey with his consent. Dah Sagbadjou Glele was a grandson of Glele. Dah Sagbadjou Glele succeeded his kinsman.

=== Ahosu of Dahomey ===
Though little is known of the current royal family of Dahomey, Dah Sagbadjou Glele was considered the last living grandson of one of his predecessors, Glele who was also king of Dahomey. In Benin ancestral kings have no power, and Dah Sagbadjou Glele, although he was a king, was considered a religious leader and held no real power in modern day Benin. After getting chosen to succeed Agoli Agbo Dedjalagni, a court official stated, "This is a deserving choice, a choice of unity, under the anointing of all the girls and sons of the great Glele royal line."

He died on 17 December 2021 in his 90s.

Regnal titles
Preceded by Agoli Agbo Dedjalagni	— TITULAR — King of Dahomey; 12 January 2019–17 December 2021	Succeeded by Georges Collinet Béhanzin
