= Gedevi people =

Historic ethnic group in Benin

The Gedevi people, also known as the Igede or Gede were an ethnic group of Yoruba people, who were the autochthonous population inhabiting the Agbomẹ plateau of south-central Benin. They lived in a number of small scale polities before the northward migration of a refugee Aja prince named Do-Aklin or Dogbari and his retinue (the Alladahọnu) from the Kingdom of Allada 60 miles to the south in c. 1620 led to their eventual conquest and absorption into the novel Fon ethnic identity. According to another account, this occurred in the year 1645 with the formation of the Kingdom of Dahomey by Dogbari's grandson, Wegbaja.

Despite their traumatic ordeal, the Gedevi continued to maintain certain unique ritual rites, which included service to their divinized ancestors and a certain rock that originated in Ife, spiritual nucleus of the Yoruba world. After the conquest of the Dahomey plateau, they were obliged into the social roles of morticians, burial services and ritual grave diggers.

== Name ==
The name Gedevi comes from –Gede, the Fon rendering of the name of the Yoruba subgroup inhabiting Abomey and the surrounding area and –Vi, which is a suffix in the Gbe languages meaning 'children' or 'descendants'. The Gedevi people are also known locally as the Ayinon or Ainon, which means: Owners of the earth, a testament to their homeland in Dahomey. They are viewed as 'overseers' of the land and protectors of the buried dead.

== In the Americas ==
Following the conquest of Wawe on the Abomey plateau by the Agasuvi from Allada, and the subsequent Dahomean wars of expansion, the Gedevi leaders were eliminated and hundreds of thousands of Gedevi people were forcefully taken to the Americas as part of the Trans Atlantic slave trade by English, French and Portuguese slavers from the Bight of Benin region In the 17th, 18th and 19th centuries. In places like Colonial Haiti, they (as Nanchon gede) established their own local Voduns called Gede/Ghede spirits, standing guard between the worlds of the living and dead.

== Interpretation of intergroup relations ==
Scholars have interpreted the legends and intergroup relations between the various peoples in the area in several ways. According to the local accounts, the refugee prince Do-Aklin is a member of the Agassouvi, the Aja ruling class who are descendants of the Tohwiyo borne of the union between Agassou, a leopard spirit or Kpo and the daughter of the king of Tado. As it turns out historically however, Agasu/Agassou is actually an Oyo prince or war chief exiled either due to his aggressive and ferocious nature or because his magic power was highly feared because people believed he could transform into a leopard.

Secondly, Agasu, the purported ancestor of Do-Aklin/Dogbari the Alladan prince may not have been the lineage patriarch of the Dahomey royal family at all. Evidence points to the fact that the leopard and Agasu was already a totem and important deity of worship by the supplanted autochthonous Gedevi before the northward migration of the Alladahonu group into the Dahomey plateau, members of which subsequently took it as an emblem. Furthermore, neither of the royal dynasties of Allada nor Porto Novo, the two other kingdoms whose rulers are supposed to be related to Dahomey by direct descent according to Dahomean royal mythology consider Agasu as a Tohwiyo (founding father).

On the contrary, dynastic traditions from Porto Novo, attribute the origins of Tè-Agbanlin, one of the three Agasuvi brothers from Allada (the one who came to Adjache) as a descendant of a Yoruba personage called Adimula/Adimola, nicknamed Oba Ajo (Avadjo), lit. Foreign King, who helped the king of Tado to defeat enemies from a neighbouring kingdom and was given the princess in marriage as a reward. To this union, twin boys were born. One of them, Dasu emigrates and becomes the king of Allada after being cheated from power back home. Thus began the origin of the Alladahonu branch of the Agasuvi dynasty.

The interpretation of all this according to some history scholars is that the rulers of Dahomey were actually members of a diasporic Yoruba people group that set out from Ife and successfully established centres in Ketu and Tado.

== See also ==
- History of the Kingdom of Dahomey
- Gede (Haitian Vodou)
- Do-Aklin
- Dahomey

== Bibliography ==
- Bay, Edna G. (1998). Wives of the leopard: gender, politics, and culture in the Kingdom of Dahomey. Charlottesville: University of Virginia Press. ISBN 0813917913.
