= Houegbadja =

King of Dahomey (r. c. 1645–1685)

- King of Dahomey
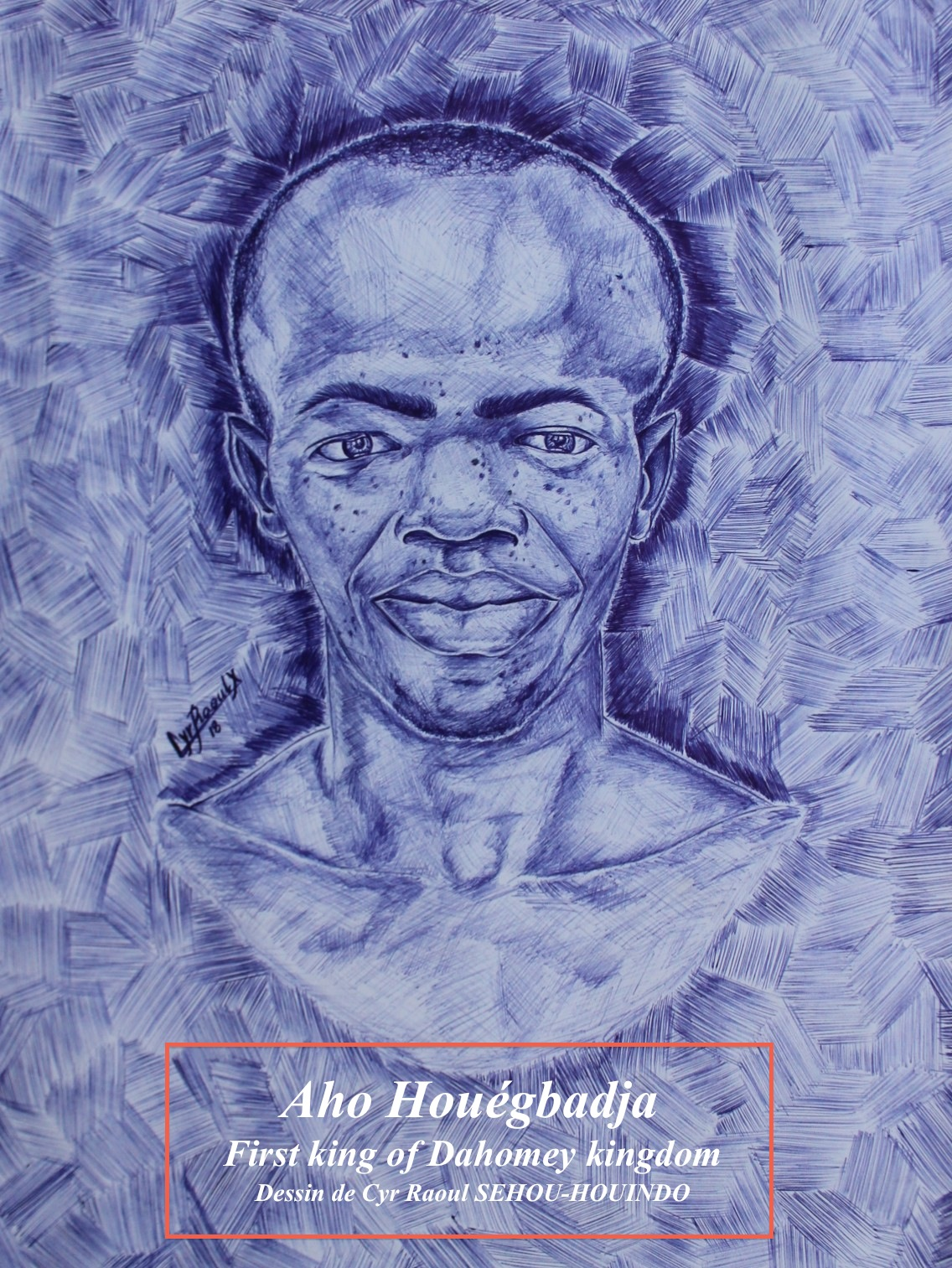
- Modern drawing of Houegbadja by Cyr Raoul A. Sehou-Houindo
- Reign: c. 1645–c.1685
- Predecessor: Dakodonou
- Successor: Akaba
- Died: 1685
- House: Aladaxonou (Allada compound/house).

Emblems of King Houegbadja (1645-1685), a fish, a trap and a scepter

Houegbadja or Wegbaja or Aho was a King in the Kingdom of Dahomey, in present-day Benin, from around 1645 until 1685. Houegbadja followed his father Dakodonou to the throne and formed much of the administration and religious practices for the Kingdom of Dahomey. Because of this he is often credited as the First King of Dahomey.

== Rise to power ==
The rise of Houegbadja to the throne is a story based largely on oral traditions. The primary oral tradition claims that Houegbadja was the son (or in some adopted son) of Dakodonu and that a Gedevi woman (the Gedevi were the native people of the Abomey Plateau) named Adanon was betrothed to Dakodonu. Although the woman was betrothed to his father, Houegbdaja got the woman pregnant and the result was that Dakodonu disinherited him. Houegbadja and Dakodonu only reconciled when Houegbadja killed a strong rival of Dakodonu, and Houegbadja was then named the heir apparent. With the death of Dakodonu, Houegbadja became the King of Dahomey.

== Administration ==
Houegbadja plays a primary role in the ceremonies of the Kingdom of Dahomey and as such is often attributed with many administrative developments that he is unlikely to have solely created. However, various oral traditions hold that Houegbadja established the current Royal Palaces of Abomey, the general structure of the royal administration, poll taxes, death taxes, and made it so that the King's sacrifices to ancestors were primary within the kingdom. Militarily, Houegbadja is often credited with the first expansions of the kingdom outside of the Abomey Plateau and is sometimes credited with creating the Dahomey Amazons (although this claim is considered unlikely).

== Legacy ==
Houegbadja is often considered the first king of Dahomey because of the establishment of the palace and creation of many rules that defined the administration of the kingdom. During the Annual Customs of Dahomey, a ceremony centered on tributes given to royal ancestors, Houegbadja was the first king recognized. He named his oldest son Akaba as his heir and upon his death around 1685, Akaba came to power.

Regnal titles
Preceded by Dakodonou	King of Dahomey; 1645–1685	Succeeded by Akaba
