= Abiola Félix Iroko =

Beninese historian (1946–2020)

- Born: 1946; French West Africa
- Died: 13 November 2020 (aged 73–74)
- Occupation: Historian

Abiola Félix Iroko (1946 – 13 November 2020) was a Beninese historian and university professor. He often wrote on the topic of slavery in Africa.

== Biography ==
Iroko earned a doctoral degree in letters and humanities from the University of Paris 1 Pantheon-Sorbonne. Throughout his career, he served as a professor of history at the University of Abomey-Calavi. He also knew how to play the zither in his youth.

Iroko was an Honorary Corresponding Fellow at the Royal Academy for Overseas Sciences.

Abiola Félix Iroko died on 13 November 2020.

== Works ==
- Les villes yoruba du Dahomey : l'exemple de Ketu (1975)
- Les cauris en Afrique Occidentale du dixième au vingtième siècle (1988)
- L'homme et les termitières en Afrique (1996)
- Calebasses béninoises : collections du Musée de l'homme, Laboratoire d'éthnologie, Musée national d'histoire naturelle (1998)
- La côte des esclaves et la traite atlantique : les faits et le jugement de l'histoire (2003)
