= Dahomey =

1600–1904 kingdom in West Africa

Coordinates: 7°11′11″N 1°59′35″E

Kingdom of Dahomey Danhɔmɛ (Fon)
- c. 1600–1904
- Top: Flag of Béhanzin (c. 1890–c. 1894); Bottom: Flag of Ghezo (1818–1858) Coat of arms (c. 1890–c. 1894)

- The Kingdom of Dahomey around 1894, superimposed on a map of the modern-day Republic of Benin, in the region of West Africa.
- Status: Kingdom, vassal state of the Oyo Empire (1730–1823), French Protectorate (1894–1904)
- Capital: Abomey
- Common languages: Fon
- Religion: Vodun
- Demonym: Dahomean
- Government: Monarchy
- Ahosu (King)
  - c. 1600–1625 (first): Do-Aklin
  - 1894–1900 (last): Agoli-agbo
- History
  - Aja settlers from Allada settle on Abomey Plateau: c. 1600
  - Dakodonu begins conquest on Abomey Plateau: c. 1620
  - King Agaja conquers Allada and Whydah: 1724–1727
  - King Ghezo defeats the Oyo Empire and ends tributary status: 1823
  - Annexed into French Dahomey: 1894
  - Disestablished: 1904

Area
- 1700: 10,000 km^{2} (3,900 sq mi)

Population
  - 1700: 350,000
- Currency: Cowrie
Preceded by	Succeeded by
Kingdom of Ardra; Kingdom of Whydah	French Dahomey
- Today part of: Benin

The Kingdom of Dahomey (/dəˈhoʊmi/; Fon: Danhɔmɛ, lit. 'In the Belly of Chief Dan') was a West African kingdom located within the present-day Republic of Benin that existed from approximately 1600 until 1904. It developed on the Abomey Plateau among the Fon people in the early 17th century and became a regional power in the 18th century by expanding south to conquer key cities like Whydah belonging to the Kingdom of Whydah on the Atlantic coast, which granted it unhindered access to the Atlantic Slave Trade.

Ending tributary status to the Oyo Empire, Dahomey became a key regional state for much of the middle 19th century. European visitors extensively documented the kingdom, and it became one of the most familiar African nations known to Europeans. An important regional power, it had an organized domestic economy built on conquest, domestic production, international trade, diplomatic relations with Europeans, a centralized administration, taxation, and an organized military. Notable aspects of Dahomey Culture were significant artwork, an all-female military unit called the Dahomey Amazons by European observers, and the elaborate religious practices of Vodun.

The growth of Dahomey coincided with the growth of the Atlantic slave trade, and it became known to Europeans as a major supplier of slaves. Dahomey was a highly militaristic society organised for constant warfare; it took captives in wars and raids against neighboring societies and sold them as slaves to Europeans in exchange for goods such as rifles, gunpowder, fabrics, cowrie shells, tobacco, pipes, and alcohol. Other captives became slaves in Dahomey royal plantations or were killed in human sacrifices during celebrations known as the Annual Customs of Dahomey. This festival involved significant collection and distribution of gifts, religious Vodun ceremonies, military parades, and discussions by dignitaries about the kingdom's future.

In the 1840s, Dahomey began to decline due to British pressure to abolish the slave trade, which included the anti-slavery blockade of Africa by the Royal Navy's West Africa Squadron. Dahomey was also weakened after crushing defeats by Abeokuta, a Yoruba city-state founded by Oyo Empire refugees migrating south. Territorial disputes with France led to the war in 1890 and part of the kingdom becoming a French protectorate. The kingdom fell four years later, when renewed fighting caused the overthrow of king Béhanzin and the country's annexation into French West Africa.

French Dahomey gained independence in 1960 as the Republic of Dahomey, renamed to People's Republic of Benin in 1975.

== Name ==
The Kingdom of Dahomey was referred to by many different names and has been written in a variety of ways, including Danxome, Danhome, and Fon. The name Fon relates to the dominant ethnic and language group, the Fon people, of the royal families of the kingdom and is how the kingdom first became known to Europeans. The names Dahomey, Danxome, and Danhome share an origin story, which historian Edna Bay says may be a false etymology.

The story goes that Dakodonu, considered the second king in modern kings lists, was granted permission by the Gedevi chiefs, the local rulers, to settle in the Abomey Plateau. Dakodonu requested additional land from a prominent chief named Dan (or Da) to which the chief responded sarcastically, "Should I open up my belly and build you a house in it?" For this insult, Dakodonu killed Dan and began the construction of his palace on the spot. The name of the kingdom was derived from the incident: Dan meaning "chief", xo meaning "belly", and me meaning "inside of", in the Fon language.

== History ==
The Kingdom of Dahomey was established around 1600 as an offshoot of the royal dynasty of the Kingdom of Allada. The foundational king for Dahomey is often considered to be Houegbadja (c. 1645–1685), who built the Royal Palaces of Abomey and began raiding and taking over towns outside of the Abomey Plateau.

=== Kings ===
King	Start of rule	End of rule
Do-Aklin (Ganyihessou)	≈1600	1620
Dakodonou	1620	1645
Houégbadja	1645	1680
Akaba	1680	1708
Agaja	1708	1740
Tegbessou (Tegbesu)	1740	1774
Kpengla	1774	1789
Agonglo	1790	1797
Adandozan	1797	1818
Guézo (Ghézo/Gezo)	1818	1858
Glèlè	1858	1889
Gbehanzin	1889	1894
Agoli-agbo	1894	1900

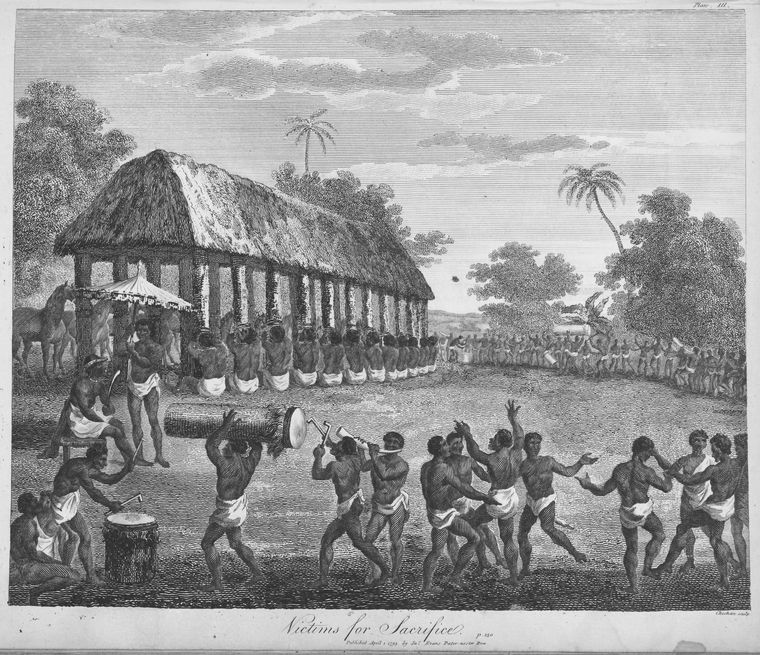
"Victims for sacrifice" – from The history of Dahomy, an inland Kingdom of Africa, 1793

=== Rule of Agaja (1708–1740) ===
King Agaja, Houegbadja's grandson, came to the throne in 1708 and began significant expansion of the Kingdom of Dahomey. This expansion was made possible by the superior military force of King Agaja's Dahomey. In contrast to surrounding regions, Dahomey employed a professional standing army numbering around ten thousand. What the Dahomey lacked in numbers, they made up for in discipline and superior arms. In 1724, Agaja conquered Allada, the origin for the royal family according to oral tradition, and in 1727 he conquered Whydah. This increased size of the kingdom, particularly along the Atlantic coast, and increased power made Dahomey into a regional power. The result was near constant warfare with the main regional state, the Oyo Empire, from 1728 until 1740. The warfare with the Oyo empire resulted in Dahomey assuming a tributary status to the Oyo empire.

=== Rule of Tegbesu (1740–1774) ===
Tegbesu, also spelled as Tegbessou, was King of Dahomey, in present-day Benin, from 1740 until 1774. Tegbesu was not the oldest son of King Agaja (1708–1740), but was selected following his father's death after winning a succession struggle with a brother. King Agaja had significantly expanded the Kingdom of Dahomey during his reign, notably conquering Whydah in 1727. This increased the size of the kingdom and increased both domestic dissent and regional opposition. Tegbessou ruled over Dahomey at a point where it needed to increase its legitimacy over those whom it had recently conquered. As a result, Tegbesu is often credited with a number of administrative changes in the kingdom in order to establish the legitimacy of the kingdom.

The slave trade increased significantly during Tegbessou's reign and began to provide the largest part of the income for the king. In addition, Tegbesu's rule is the one with the first significant kpojito or mother of the leopard with Hwanjile in that role. The kpojito became a prominently important person in Dahomey royalty. Hwanjile, in particular, is said to have changed dramatically the religious practices of Dahomey by creating two new deities and more closely tying worship to that of the king. According to one oral tradition, as part of the tribute owed by Dahomey to Oyo, Agaja had to give to Oyo one of his sons. The story claims that only Hwanjile, of all of Agaja's wives, was willing to allow her son to go to Oyo. This act of sacrifice, according to the oral tradition, made Tegbesu favored by King Agaja. Agaja reportedly told Tegbesu that he was the future king, but his brother Zinga was still the official heir.

=== Rule of Ghezo (1818–1859) ===
When King Ghezo ascended the throne in 1818, he was confronted by two immediate obstacles: the Kingdom of Dahomey was in political turmoil, and it was financially unstable. First, he needed to gain political independence by removing the tributary yoke that the Yoruba empire of Oyo had over the Dahomey since 1748. Secondly, he needed to revitalize the Dahomey economy. Both of these objectives relied on the slave trade. King Ghezo implemented new military strategies, which allowed them to take a physical stand against the Oyo, who were also a major competitor in the slave trade. He also put stipulations on Dahomey's participation in the slave trade. Under his reign, no longer would the Dahomey be traded, as they were under the leadership of his brother, Adandozan. Dahomey would focus on capturing their enemies and trading them instead. King Ghezo sought to eventually lead his people toward the "legitimate" trade of palm oil.

The Dahomey were soon met with victory when they brought down the Oyo Empire and its yoke at Paonignan in 1827. While Brazil's demand for slaves increased in 1830, the British started a campaign to abolish the slave trade in Africa. The British government began putting significant pressure on King Ghezo in the 1840s to end the slave trade in Dahomey. King Ghezo responded to these requests by emphasizing that he was unable to end the slave trade because of domestic pressure. He explained to them that the entire region had become dependent on the slave trading, so ending immediately would destabilize his kingdom and lead to anarchy. King William Dappa Pepple of Bonny and King Kosoko of Lagos took the same stance toward the British requests. Instead, King Ghezo proposed an expansion of the palm oil trade and gradual abolition of the slave trade.

King Ghezo's reign was marked by great battles and significant changes to the empire, including the elevation of the Agojie. These "Dahomey Amazon" were pivotal to the defeat of Oyo Empire. His reign also cemented the Kingdom of Dahomey as one of the most powerful African kingdoms that stood against attempts by European missionaries, with Egba support, at converting people to Christianity, and maintained their traditional religion, known as Vodun. He abolished the human sacrifice of slaves and removed the death penalty for certain lesser offenses, such as adultery. Despite the kingdom's history of brutality, King Ghezo was often characterized as honorable and unconquerable, even by his enemies. British missionary Thomas Birch Freeman described him as "one of the most remarkable men of his age, whether we consider him in his private capacity as a man, or as a warrior and a statesmen."

=== End ===
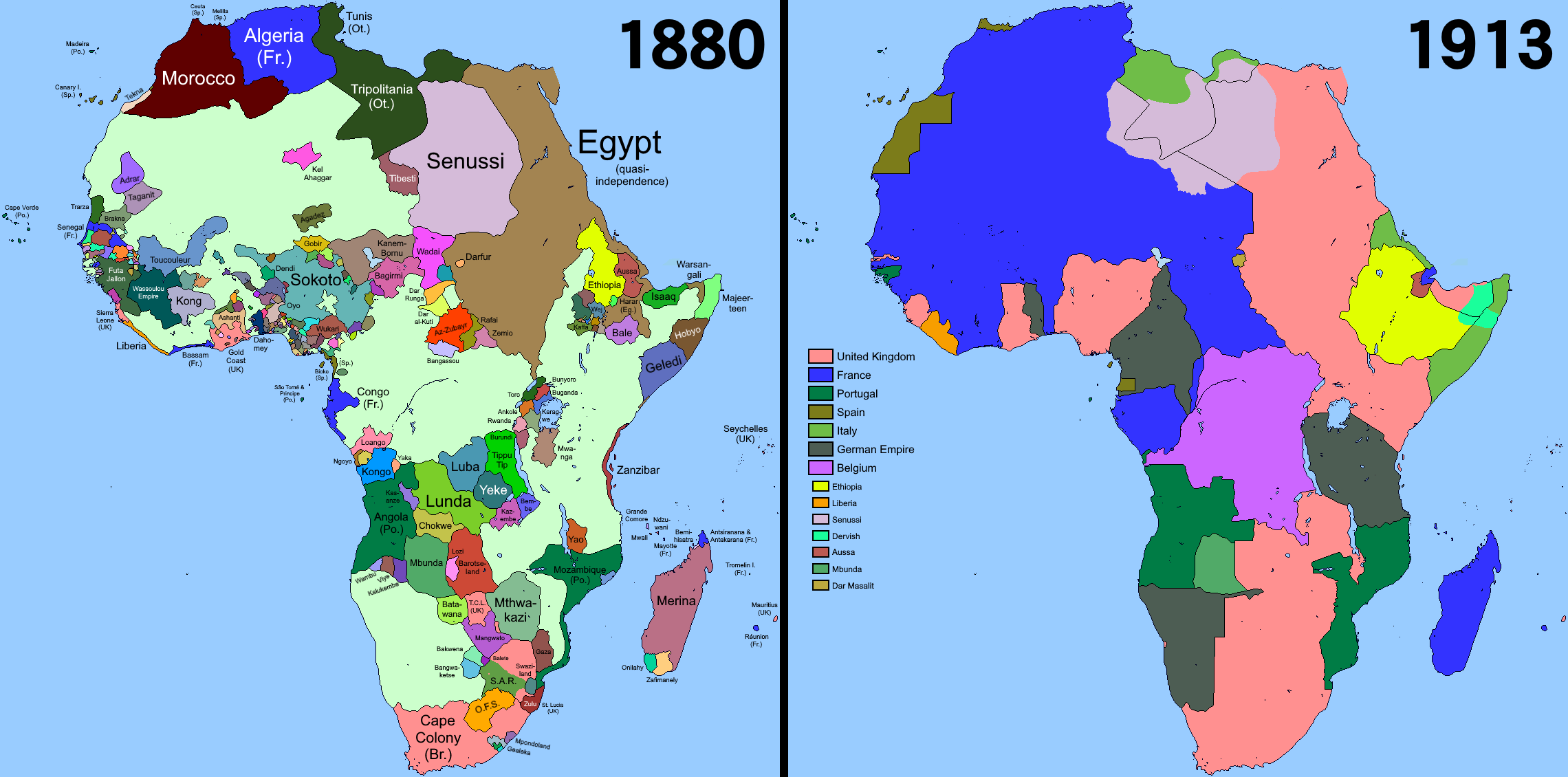
Comparison of Africa in the years 1880 and 1913

The kingdom fought the First Franco-Dahomean War and Second Franco-Dahomean War with France. The kingdom was reduced and made a French protectorate in 1894.

In 1904, the area became part of a French colony, French Dahomey.

In 1958, French Dahomey became the self-governing colony called the Republic of Dahomey and gained full independence in 1960. It was renamed in 1975 the People's Republic of Benin and in 1991 the Republic of Benin.

=== Modernity ===
Today, the kingdom continues to exist as a constituent monarchy located within Benin. Its rulers no longer hold any official powers under Benin's constitution, but they retain some political and economic influence. Modern kings participate in important Vodun religious festivals and other traditional ceremonies.

== Politics ==
Early writings often presented the kingdom as an absolute monarchy led by a despotic king. These depictions were often deployed as arguments by different sides in the slave trade debates, mainly in the United Kingdom, and as such were probably exaggerations. Recent historical work has emphasized the limits of monarchical power in the Kingdom of Dahomey. Historian John C. Yoder, with attention to the Great Council in the kingdom, argued that its activities do not "imply that Dahomey's government was democratic or even that her politics approximated those of nineteenth-century European monarchies. Such evidence supports the thesis that governmental decisions were molded by conscious responses to internal political pressures as well as by executive fiat." The primary political divisions revolved around villages with chiefs and administrative posts appointed by the king and acting as his representatives to adjudicate disputes in the village.

=== King ===
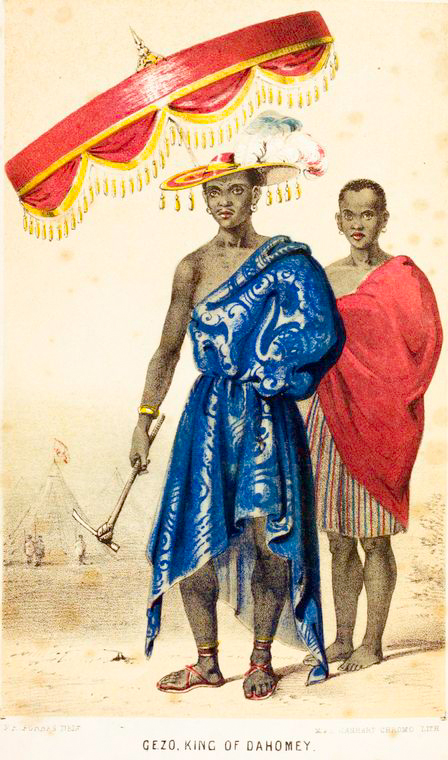
King Ghezo displayed with a royal umbrella

The King of Dahomey (Ahosu in the Fon language) was the sovereign power of the kingdom. All of the kings claimed to be part of the Alladaxonou dynasty, claiming descent from the royal family in Allada. Much of the succession rules and administrative structures were created early by Kings Houegbadja, Akaba, and Agaja. Succession through the male members of the line was the norm, with the kingship typically (but not always) going to the oldest son. The king was selected largely through discussion and decision in the meetings of the Great Council, although how this operated was not always clear. The Great Council brought together a host of different dignitaries from throughout the kingdom yearly to meet at the Annual Customs of Dahomey. Discussions would be lengthy and included members, both men and women, from throughout the kingdom. At the end of the discussions, the king would declare the consensus of the group.

=== Royal court ===
Key positions in the King's court included the migan (Prime Minister), the mehu (Finance Minister), the yovogan, the tokpo (Minister of Agriculture), the agan (general of the army), the kpojito (or queen mother), and later the chacha (or viceroy) of Whydah. Each of these cabinet positions—which, with the exception of the kpojito, were headed by men—had a female counterpart to complement them. The migan—a combination of mi (our) and gan (chief)—was a primary consul for the king, a key judicial figure, and served as the head executioner. The mehu was similarly a key administrative officer who managed the palaces and the affairs of the royal family, economic matters, and the areas to the south of Allada (making the position key to contact with Europeans).

== Foreign relations ==
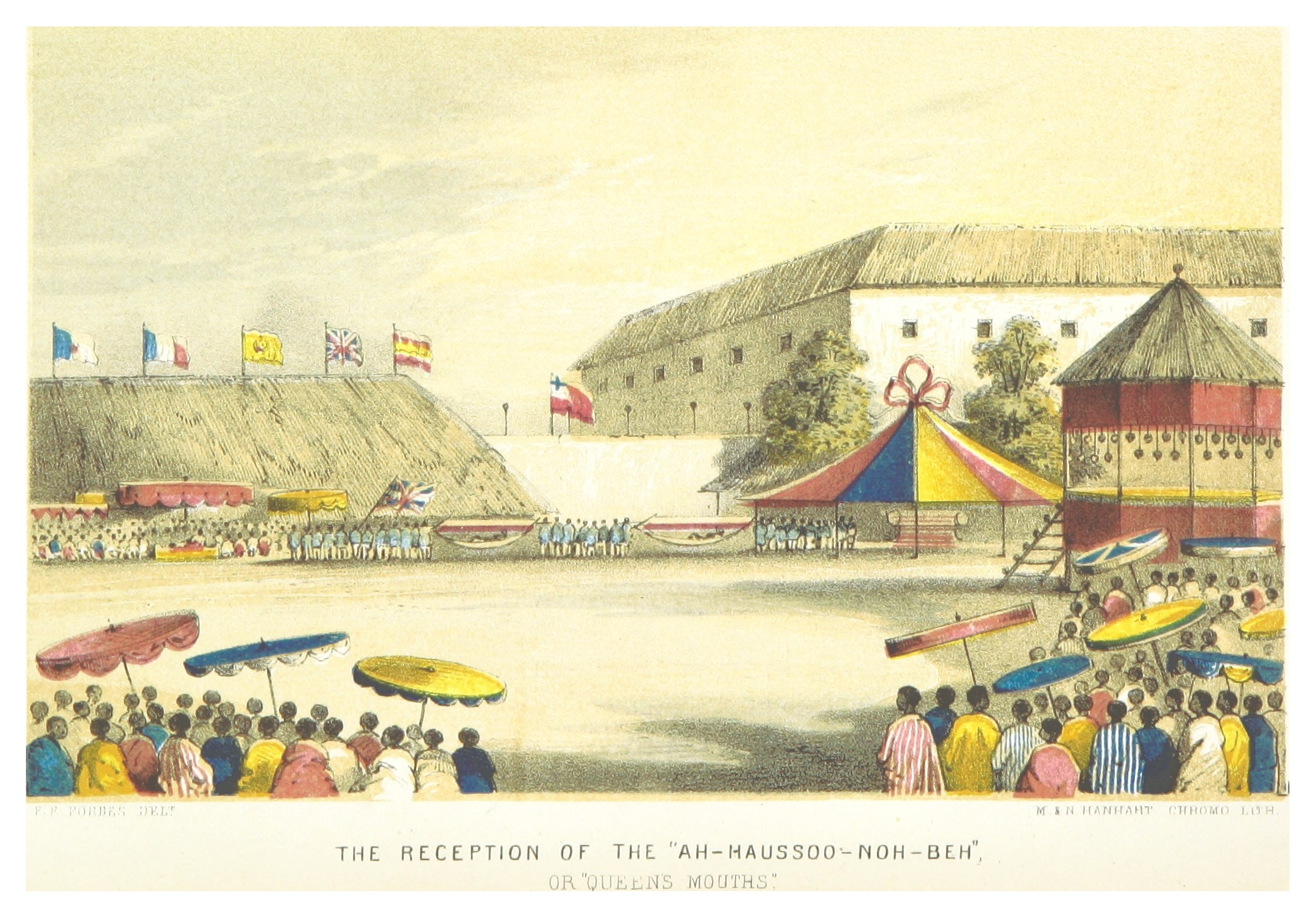
The reception of the Ah-Haussoo-Noh-Beh in Abomey drawn by Frederick E. Forbes in 1851

The relations between Dahomey and other countries were complex and heavily impacted by the transatlantic slave trade.

=== Brazil ===
In 1750, the Kingdom of Dahomey sent a diplomatic mission to Salvador, Portuguese colony of Brazil in order to strengthen diplomatic relations with this Portuguese colony following an incident which led to the expulsion of Portuguese-Brazilian diplomatic authorities in 1743.

Other Dahomey missions were sent to Portuguese colony of Brazil from 1795 to 1805 with the purpose of strengthening relations with Portuguese colonial authorities and slave buyers residing in Brazilian territory, ensuring that they maintained an interest in purchasing enslaved people supplied by Dahomey rather than rival kingdoms. It is also recorded that in 1823, the Kingdom of Dahomey formally recognized Brazil's independence, making it one of the first political entities in the world to do so.

The Atlantic slave trade between Brazil and Dahomey remained intense even under pressure from the United Kingdom for its abolition. Francisco Félix de Sousa, a former enslaved person and later a major slave trader in the Dahomey region, became a politically influential figure in that kingdom after the ascent of Guezo to the Dahomean throne. He was granted the honorary title of Chachá, vice-king of Ajudá, and a monopoly on the exportation of slaves. (Note: Brazilian historiography has attributed the primacy of this recognition to the United Provinces of the Río de la Plata, also in 1823.)

=== France ===
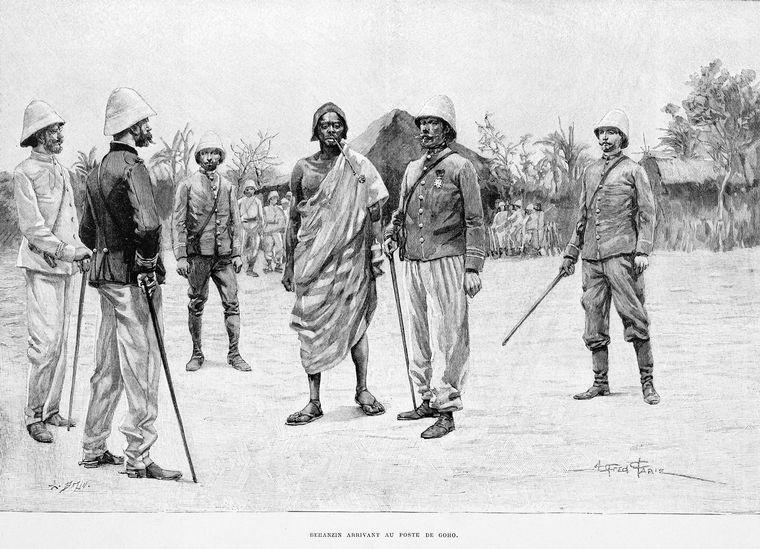
In 1894, the last King of Dahomey, Béhanzin, surrendered his person to Alfred-Amédée Dodds

In 1861, the kingdom of Porto-Novo, one of Dahomey's tributaries, was bombarded by the Royal Navy. Porto-Novo asked for protection from France and became a French protectorate as a result in 1863. This status was rejected by King Behanzin, who still declared Porto-Novo to be a tributary of Dahomey. Another issue of contention was the status of Cotonou, a port the French believed was under their control because of a treaty signed by Dahomey's representative in Whydah. Dahomey ignored all French claims there as well and continued to collect customs from the port. These territorial disputes escalated into the First Franco-Dahomean War in 1890, resulting in French victory. Dahomey was forced to sign a treaty surrendering Porto-Novo and Cotonou to the French. It later returned to raiding the area and disregarded French complaints, triggering the Second Franco-Dahomean War in 1892. The kingdom was defeated in 1894, it was annexed into the French colonial empire as French Dahomey, and King Behanzin was exiled to Algeria.

=== Portugal ===
The Portuguese fort at Ouidah was destroyed by the army of Dahomey in 1743 during its conquest of the city, so King Tegbesu desired to renew relations with Portugal. Dahomey sent at least five embassies to Portugal and Brazil during the years of 1750, 1795, 1805, 1811 and 1818, with the goal of negotiating the terms of the Atlantic slave trade. These missions created an official correspondence between the kings of Dahomey and the kings of Portugal, and gifts were exchanged between them. The Portuguese Crown paid for the expenses travel and accommodation expenses of Dahomey's ambassadors, who traveled between Lisbon and Salvador, Bahia. The embassies of 1805 and 1811 brought letters from King Adandozan, who had imprisoned Portuguese subjects in the Dahomean capital of Abomey and requested for Portugal to trade exclusively at Ouidah. Portugal promised to answer to his demands if he released the prisoners.

A long and detailed letter from King Adandonzan dated October 9, 1810, shows that he had knowledge of the Napoleonic Wars and the subsequent exile of the Portuguese royal family to Brazil, and he expressed remorse that he was not able to help the Portuguese royal family during their war against France.

Soon the news that Your Royal Majesty and all the Royal family were made prisoners of the French, who took Lisbon, as well as the King of Spain, started arriving. Some time passed and another vessel came and brought other news that Your Royal Majesty and Our Sovereign Mother Queen of Portugal had left for the City of Bahia, under the protection of the English and the Portuguese Navy. Then more time passed and another vessel brought news that you have moved to Rio de Janeiro, where we know that the Duke of Cadaval deceased, for which I feel sorry and give you my condolences...what I feel the most is to no longer be the neighbour of Our Majesty, and not being able to walk on firm land to give you a help with my arm, so my wish is big, as here I have also fought many wars in the backlands.

After detailing how he defeated the king of the Mahi nation, Adandonzan tells the Portuguese,

...Give me also news about the Wars, and also give me news about the wars with the French nation and the others, it will make me happy to know about it

=== United Kingdom ===
Dahomey became a target of the British Empire's anti-slavery campaign during the 19th century. The British sent diplomatic missions to Dahomey in an effort to convince King Ghezo to abolish human sacrifice and slave trading. Ghezo did not immediately concede to British demands but attempted to maintain friendly relations with Britain by encouraging the growth of new trade in palm oil instead. In 1851, the Royal Navy imposed a naval blockade against Dahomey, forcing Ghezo to sign a treaty in 1852 that immediately abolished the export of slaves. This was broken when slave trading resumed in 1857 and 1858. Historian Martin Meredith quotes Ghezo telling the British:

The slave trade has been the ruling principle of my people. It is the source of their glory and wealth. Their songs celebrate their victories and the mother lulls the child to sleep with notes of triumph over an enemy reduced to slavery.

During a diplomatic mission to Dahomey in 1849, Captain Frederick E. Forbes of the Royal Navy received an enslaved girl (later named Sarah Forbes Bonetta) from King Ghezo as a "gift", who would later become a goddaughter to Queen Victoria.

=== United States ===
During the American Revolution, the rebelling United Colonies prohibited the international slave trade for a variety of economic, political, and moral reasons depending on the colony. Following the end of the revolution, U.S. President Thomas Jefferson signed the Act Prohibiting Importation of Slaves in 1807, which federally outlawed the international slave trade, though domestic slavery itself would persist until the American Civil War. Thus, the United States never established any formal diplomatic relations with the Kingdom of Dahomey. The last known slave ship that sailed to the United States secretly and illegally imported 110 slaves from Dahomey, purchased long after the abolition of the slave trade. The story was mentioned in the newspaper The Tarboro Southerner on July 14, 1860. Five days earlier, a schooner called Clotilda, captained by William Foster, arrived in the bay of Mobile, Alabama carrying the last known shipment of slaves to the U.S. In 1858, an American man named Timothy Meaher made a wager with acquaintances that despite the law banning the slave trade, he could safely bring a load of slaves from Africa. He built the Clotilda slave ship and sent William Foster to captain it and retrieve enslaved Africans.

Captain William Foster arrived in Ouidah, a coastal port of Dahomey, and retrieved 110 slaves. Describing how he came in possession of the slaves, he wrote in his journal in 1860,

From thence I went to see the King of Dahomey. Having agreeably transacted affairs with the Prince we went to the warehouse where they had in confinement four thousand captives in a state of nudity from which they gave me liberty to select one hundred and twenty-five as mine offering to brand them for me, from which I preemptorily [sic] forbid; commenced taking on cargo of negroes, successfully securing on board one hundred and ten.

Zora Neale Hurston wrote about her interviews with Oluale Kossola, who was thought to be the last survivor of the Clotilda, in her book Barracoon. Later, it was found that Matilda McCrear was the last living survivor of that atrocity. A notable descendant of a slave from this ship is Ahmir Khalib Thompson, an American music artist known as Questlove. Mr. Thompson's story is depicted in the PBS Television show Finding Your Roots [Season 4, Episode 9].

=== Yoruba ===
The Oyo Empire engaged in frequent conflicts with the Kingdom of Dahomey and Dahomey became a tributary of the Oyo from 1732 until 1823. The city-state of Porto-Novo, under the protection of Oyo, and Dahomey had a long-standing rivalry largely over control of the slave trade along the coast. The rise of Abeokuta in the 1840s created another power rivaling Dahomey, largely by creating a safe haven for people from the slave trade.

Notable Yoruba people who were captured by Dahomey in slave raids following the collapse of the Oyo Empire include Sarah Forbes Bonetta (Aina), Cudjoe Lewis (Oluale Kossola), Matilda McCrear (Abake), Redoshi, and Seriki Williams Abass (Ifaremilekun Fagbemi).

== Military ==
The military of the Kingdom of Dahomey was divided into two units: the right and the left. The right was controlled by the migan and the left was controlled by the mehu. At least by the time of Agaja, the kingdom had developed a standing army that remained encamped wherever the king was. Soldiers in the army were recruited as young as seven or eight years old, initially serving as shield carriers for regular soldiers. After years of apprenticeship and military experience, they were allowed to join the army as regular soldiers. To further incentivize the soldiers, each soldier received bonuses paid in cowry shells for each enemy they killed or captured in battle. This combination of lifelong military experience and monetary incentives resulted in a cohesive, well-disciplined military. One European said Agaja's standing army consisted of "elite troops, brave and well-disciplined, led by a prince full of valor and prudence, supported by a staff of experienced officers". The army consisted of 15,000 personnel which was divided into right, left, center and reserve; and in each of these was further divided into companies and platoons.

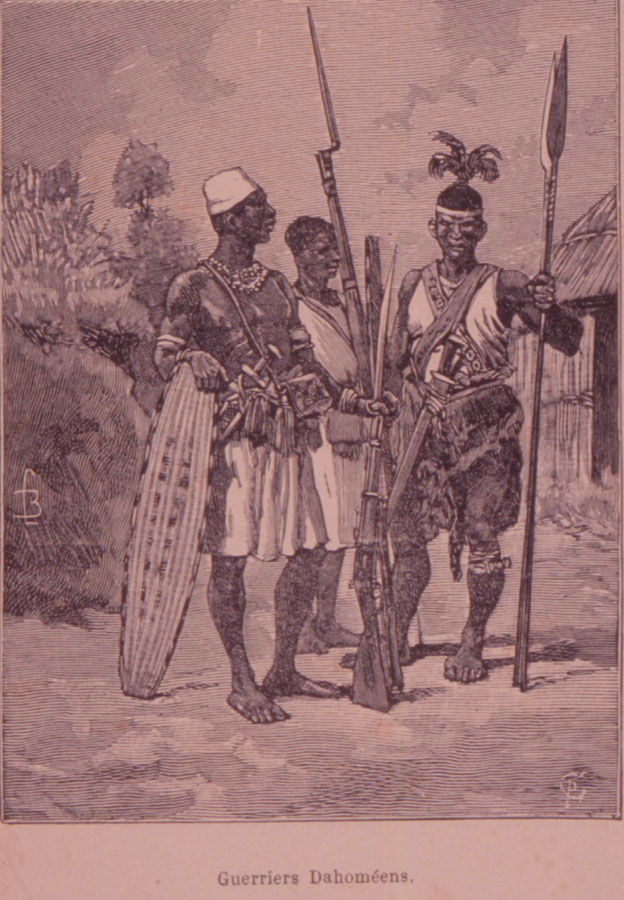
Dahomey warriors in 1893

In addition to being well trained, the Dahomey army under Agaja was also very well armed. The Dahomey army favored imported European weapons as opposed to traditional weapons. For example, they used European flintlock muskets in long-range combat and imported steel swords and cutlasses in close combat. The Dahomean army also possessed 25 cannons. By the late 19th century, Dahomey had a large arsenal of weapons. These included the Chassepot Dreyse, Mauser, Snider Enfield, Wanzel, Werndl, Peabody action, Winchester, Spencer, Albini, Robert Jones carbine, French musketoon 1882 and the Mitrailleuse Reffye 1867. Along with firearms, Dahomey employed mortars.

When going into battle, the king would take a secondary position to the field commander with the reason given that if any spirit were to punish the commander for decisions it should not be the king. Dahomey units were drilled constantly. They fired on command, employed countermarch, and formed extended lines from deep columns. Tactics such as covering fire, frontal attacks and flanking movements were used in the warfare of Dahomey. The Dahomey Amazons, a unit of all-female soldiers, is one of the most unusual aspects of the military of the kingdom. Unlike other regional powers, the military of Dahomey did not have a significant cavalry (like the Oyo empire) or naval power (which prevented expansion along the coast). From the 18th century, the state could obtain naval support from Ardra where they had created a subordinate dynasty after conquering the state in the early 18th century. Dahomey enlisted the services of Ardra's navy against the Epe in 1778 and Badagry in 1783.

=== Amazons ===
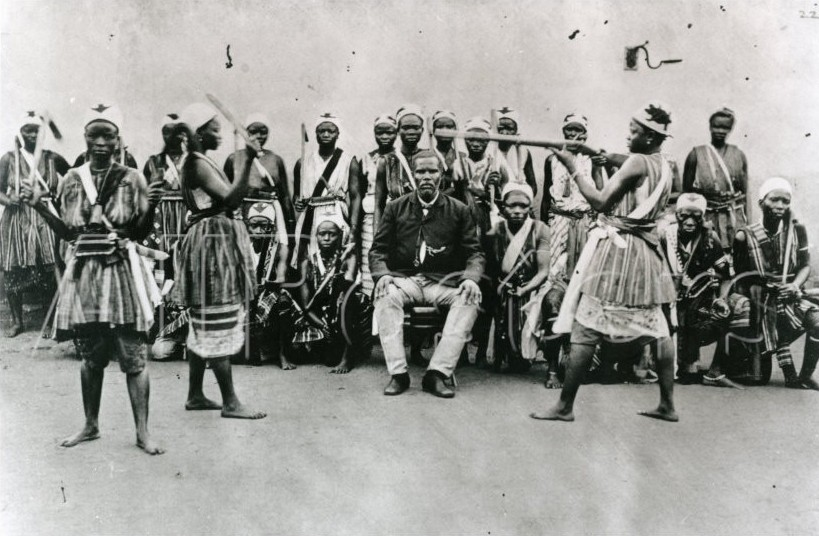
Dahomey female soldiers

The Dahomean state became widely known for its corps of female soldiers. Their origins are debated; they may have formed from a palace guard or from gbetos (female hunting teams).

They were organized around 1729 to fill out the army and make it look larger in battle, armed only with banners. The women reportedly behaved so courageously they became a permanent corps. In the beginning, the soldiers were criminals pressed into service rather than death. Eventually, the corps was respected enough that King Ghezo ordered every family to send him their daughters, with the fittest being chosen as soldiers. European accounts clarified that seven distinct movements were required to load a Dane gun which took an Amazon 30 seconds in comparison to the 50 seconds it took a Dahomean male soldier to load.

=== Siege and engineering ===
In order to repress the navies of its neighbors, Dahomey built causeways starting from 1774. During a campaign against Whydah that year, Dahomey was able to force Whydah to fortify itself at an island called Foudou-Cong. Dahomey cut trees which were planted in the water to serve as a causeway and bridge the army's access to the fortified Whydah island. The causeway also obstructed the movement of a 700 canoe force belonging to Whydah. As a result, the Whydah army had to survive on the boats for months sustaining its forces with fish diet. According to Thornton, Dahomey used this strategy of siege causeways again in 1776 against another opponent state where it built 3 bridges to connect the island housing the opponent forces.

Coastal belligerents opposing Dahomey allied with European forts against the state. Dahomey was able to capture Dutch and Portuguese forts in the 18th century through the use of ladders and sappers. Thornton writes that in 1737, Dahomey used scale ladders against the Dutch fort in Keta simultaneously as its sappers built a tunnel under the fort's bastion causing it to collapse when its defenders fired an artillery round within the bastion. A similar tactic was employed against a Portuguese fort with 30 mounted guns at Whydah in 1743 as its bastions collapsed enabling the Dahomey infantry to enter the fort. In 1728, Dahomey forces captured and destroyed a French fort at Whydah by blowing up the magazine that held the fort's ammunition and gunpowder. Another tactic for attacking coastal forts was the burning of nearby villages during a land breeze in order for the wind to carry the flames toward the fort. This tactic was first revealed by a British commander at Whydah in 1728, who countered it by burning the nearby villages during a sea breeze to prevent the Dahomeyan army from burning the villages during a land breeze.

As a result of the threat posed by Oyo in the 18th century, the state built fortifications of its own with the help of a French officer from whom they learnt field fortification and artillery. According to a Dutch source in 1772, the king of Dahomey "has made deep ditches around his entire country as well as walls and batteries mounted with cannons he captured at Fida [Whydah]." Thornton suggests these fortifications were mostly built out of wood. Dahomey used a tactic of trench construction against Oyo where its forces withdrew into the trenches after confrontation with the Oyo force. Despite this, Dahomey was overwhelmed by an Oyo siege after the arrival of reinforcement. In the mid 18th century, Abomey was surrounded by a ditch accessible by bridges whiles in 1772 the royal residence was surrounded with a mud brick wall 20 feet high, "with blockhouses on each wall."

Dahomey also built underground chambers in Abomey which served varying functions including that of providing military installations for the army. These souterrains have been dated to the late 17th century. Wheeled vehicles are recorded to have been implemented in Dahomeyan warfare. In an operation against Abeokuta in 1864, Dahomey fielded three guns mounted on locally made carriages of which historian Robin Law adds that these weapons did not play an effective role in the battle. Some references exist about the possible production of guns and gunpowder in Dahomey. In 1880, king Béhanzin informed a French mission that firearms were manufactured in the state. Amid the war with France in 1892, a French expeditionary force discovered tools and resources such as cartridge cases, signal rockets and electric batteries which are necessary for making cartridges and repairing firearms.

== Economy ==
The economic structure of the kingdom was highly intertwined with the political and religious systems and these developed together significantly. The main currency was cowrie shells.

=== Domestic ===
The domestic economy largely focused on agriculture and crafts for local consumption. Until the development of palm oil, very little agricultural or craft goods were traded outside of the kingdom. Markets served a key role in the kingdom and were organized around a rotating cycle of four days with a different market each day (the market type for the day was religiously sanctioned). Agriculture work was largely decentralized and done by most families. With the expansion of the kingdom, agricultural plantations began to be a common agricultural method in the kingdom. Craftwork was largely dominated by a formal guild system.

Plantation agriculture became more important following the decline of the slave trade. Slaves were diverted to these planations to produce mainly palm oil. Initially, private traders were the "sole proprietors of large-scale oil plantations in Dahomey." The aristocracy further engaged in the sector starting from the mid-19th century. Slavery also became more rigid and harsh during this period.

=== Finance ===
Cowries, beans and seeds were used as mnemonic aids for keeping financial records. Bills of exchange existed in Dahomey. They were initially unfavourable among the King's traders at Whydah in 1727. In the late 19th century, European traders also paid custom duties in the form of promissory notes. It was during the reign of King Gele in the 1870s where vouchers replaced cowries for such duties. These vouchers were kept in a chest at the administrative office and were used as an exchange medium with European traders.

A two-storey house at the Abomey palace called akuehue (cowrie house) was possibly the treasury of the state. It was documented in the 19th century and cowries were stored in this house and also disbursed for state purposes. Karl Polanyi suggests the cowrie currency was centrally issued but Robin Law disputes this. Several wealthy citizens stored their cowrie wealth in a building called akueho (cowrie huts) located in the compounds of their houses. Such cowrie huts were designed to protect the cowries from fire and theft. Iroko argues that this was a form of banking in Dahomey because the owners of such akueho houses regularly kept the deposits of others in the storehouse which they used as a form of loans to 3rd parties. Robin Law, on the other hand, is sceptical of Iroko's theory and he states that the money-holders of the akueho houses charged depositors for utilizing their services instead of offering interest to attract funds.

=== Taxation ===
Herskovits recounts a complex tax system in the kingdom, in which officials who represented the king, the tokpe, gathered data from each village regarding their harvest. Then the king set a tax based upon the level of production and village population. In addition, the king's own land and production were taxed. After significant road construction undertaken by the kingdom, toll booths were also established that collected yearly taxes based on the goods people carried and their occupation. Officials also sometimes imposed fines for public nuisance before allowing people to pass. Tax officials on road tolls were provided with armed guards.

Taxes were imposed on craft workers including blacksmiths, weavers and wood cutters for example. Kangaroo courts could be held at any place such as the market or on roads, presided over by officials recognized by the central government. Such courts could extract some form of tax from the litigants before judging the case. In 1874, J. A. Sketchy wrote that prostitution (Ko-si) was licensed by the king. Since the 18th century, the government was responsible for distributing prostitutes throughout the state at a price set by civil decree. Taxes were derived from prostitutes during the annual customs.

=== Trade ===
In the 18th century, Dahomey authorised the akhigan (king's traders) in Whydah as the agent responsible to trade on behalf of the king and to collect custom duties. By the 19th century, the akhigan was replaced with the chacha who was given additional powers such as administrative authority over European traders at whydah. Private traders of Dahomey required a license from the King to trade at Whydah.

=== Royal Road ===
An unpaved road system was developed from the port of Ouidah through Cana up to Abomey. Its purpose was to improve the transportation of the king between Cana and Abomey. The Royal Road dates to the 18th century, likely during Kpengla's reign, but most primary sources about the road date to the century after. The road stretched over seven miles in a near straight line, between the gates of the two towns and its width was estimated to be 20–30 meters. The road was occasionally kept weeded and cleared with cutlass. Primary sources give varying accounts that the Royal Road was kept cleared every two or three months or even six weeks. The road was shaded by tall trees of which the biggest specimen was that of a bombax. Surrounding the road on both sides were intensive farms which Forbes stated in the mid 19th century, to have "rivaled that of the Chinese."

In addition, religious shrines were lined along the road and Forbes counted 60 of them en route to Abomey. A palace was built halfway along the road by Tegbesu (1740–1774) to host the king as a resting place during transport. There is a lack of information about security provided across the Royal Road. Sources from the mid 19th century indicated that a large pair of carronades was placed on each side of the road near Abomey, which pointed toward Cana. A large number of cannons with diverse calibers were also placed at the road's end before the gates of Cana. Historian Alpern, indicates that the cannons in front of Cana might have served a ceremonial purpose because they lacked carriages to utilize.

=== Slavery ===
Both domestic slavery and the Atlantic slave trade were important to the economy of Dahomey. Men, women, and children captured by Dahomey in wars and slave raids were sold to European slave traders in exchange for various goods such as rifles, gunpowder, textiles, cowry shells, and alcohol. Dahomey used magical rituals for slave trading. Prior to being sold to Europeans, slaves were forced to march in circles around the "Tree of Forgetfulness" so they would lose memories of their culture, family, and homeland. The purpose of this ritual was to prevent the spirits of deceased slaves from returning and seeking revenge against the royalty of Dahomey.

Other war captives who were not intended to be sold to Europeans remained in Dahomey as slaves. There, they worked on royal plantations that supplied food for the army and royal court. Some historians such as Watson and Schellinger have argued that the shift from slave trading to a plantation economy in the 19th century worsened the social perception of slaves in Dahomey. They cite reasons that slaves before then were treated as members of their master's family and they could attain free status after a generation or two. Following the intensification of palm oil in the state, it became common for slaves to be abused and ill treated. To solve this issue, King Ghezo declared the trial of cases involving the murder of slaves at the Judicial Court in Abomey.

There was a history of large-scale human sacrifice using slaves.

== Religion ==
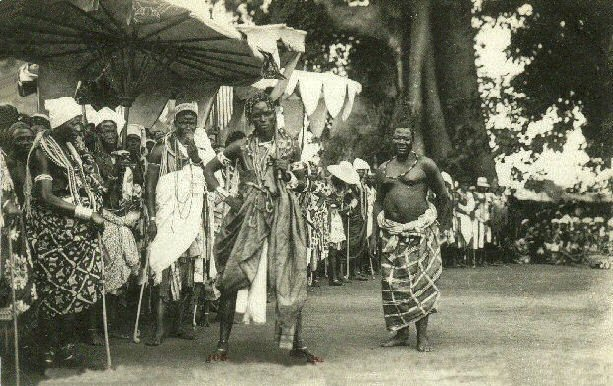
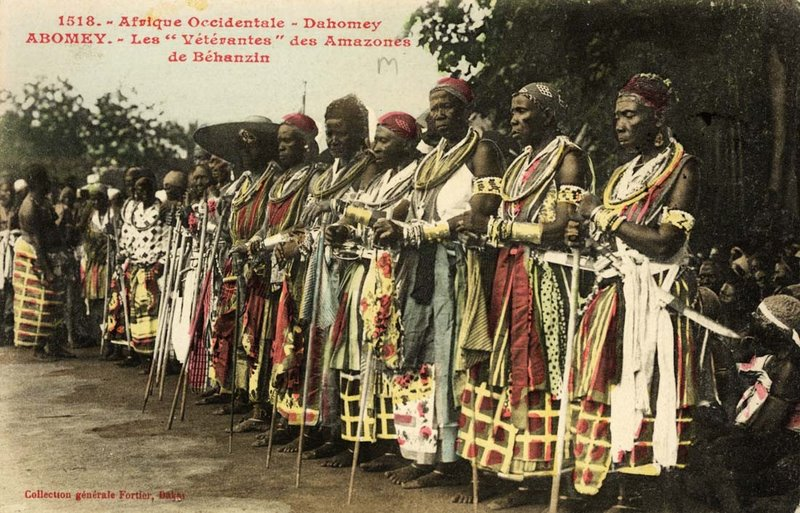
Left: Dance of the Fon chiefs during celebrations. Right: The celebration at Abomey (1908). Veteran warriors of the Fon king Béhanzin, son of king Glele.

The Kingdom of Dahomey shared many religious rituals with surrounding populations. It also developed unique ceremonies, beliefs, and religious stories. These included royal ancestor worship and West African Vodun.

=== Royal ancestor worship ===
Early kings established clear worship of royal ancestors and centralized their ceremonies in the Annual Customs of Dahomey. The spirits of the kings had an exalted position in the land of the dead and it was necessary to get their permission for many activities on earth. Ancestor worship predated the kingdom of Dahomey; under King Agaja, a cycle of ritual was created centered on first celebrating the ancestors of the king and then celebrating a family lineage.

The Annual Customs of Dahomey (xwetanu or huetanu in Fon) involved multiple elaborate components and some aspects may have been added in the 19th century. In general, the celebration involved distribution of gifts, human sacrifice, military parades, and political councils. Its main religious aspect was to offer thanks and gain the approval for ancestors of the royal lineage.

Human sacrifice was an important part of the practice. During the Annual Custom, 500 prisoners would be sacrificed. In addition, when a ruler died, hundreds, to thousands of prisoners would be sacrificed. In 1727, an English trader alleged that he witness the Dahomey massacre 400 people during a Vodun ceremony. The number is also often reported to be 4,000. Human sacrifice was often exaggerated by contemporary anti-abolitionist Western authors, who sought to justify the continued need for slavery as a means to "rescue" Africans from a worse fate in Dahomey.

=== Cosmology ===
Dahomey had a unique form of West African Vodun that linked together preexisting animist traditions with vodun practices. Oral history recounted that Hwanjile, a wife of Agaja and mother of Tegbessou, brought Vodun to the kingdom and ensured its spread. The primary deity is the combined Mawu-Lisa (Mawu having female characteristics and Lisa having male characteristics) and it is claimed that this god took over the world that was created by their mother Nana-Buluku. Mawu-Lisa governs the sky and is the highest pantheon of gods, but other gods exist in the earth and in thunder. Religious practice organized different priesthoods and shrines for each different god and each different pantheon (sky, earth or thunder). Women made up a significant amount of the priest class and the chief priest was always a descendant of Dakodonou.

== Arts ==
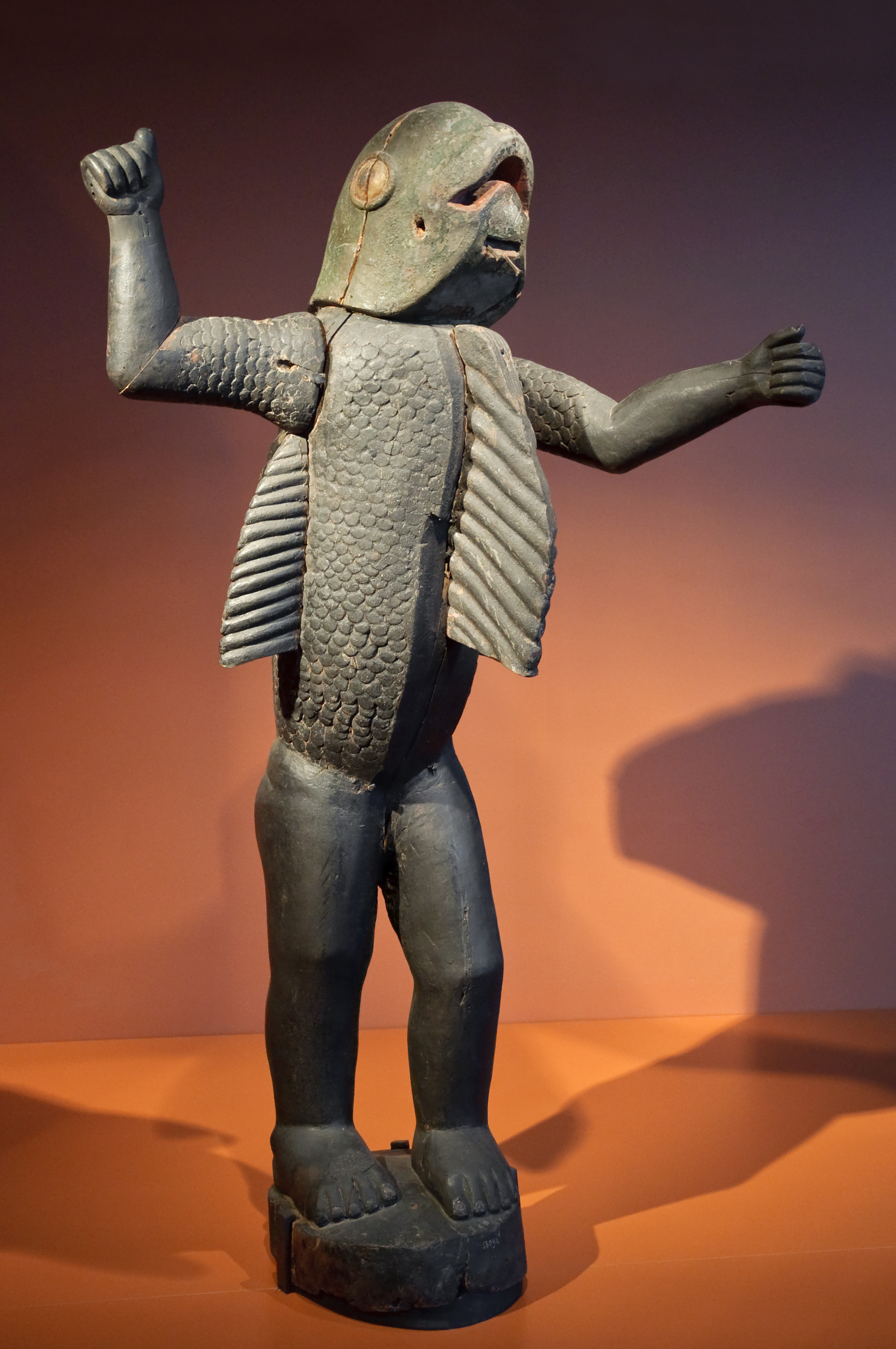
Zoomorphic representation of Béhanzin as a shark

The arts in Dahomey were unique and distinct from the artistic traditions elsewhere in Africa. The arts were substantially supported by the king and his family, had non-religious traditions, assembled multiple different materials, and borrowed widely from other peoples in the region. Common art forms included wood and ivory carving, metalwork (including silver, iron and brass, appliqué cloth, and clay bas-reliefs).

The king was key in supporting the arts and many of them provided significant sums for artists resulting in the unique development, for the region, of a non-religious artistic tradition in the kingdom. Artists were not of a specific class but both royalty and commoners made important artistic contributions. Kings were often depicted in large zoomorphic forms with each king resembling a particular animal in multiple representations.

Suzanne Blier identifies two unique aspects of art in Dahomey: Assemblage of different components and borrowing from other states. Assemblage of art, involving the combination of multiple components (often of different materials) combined in a single piece of art, was common in all forms and was the result of the various kings promoting finished products rather than particular styles. This assembling may have been a result of the second feature, which involved the wide borrowing of styles and techniques from other cultures and states. Clothing, cloth work, architecture, and the other forms of art all resemble other artistic representation from around the region.

Much of the artwork revolved around the royalty. Each of the palaces at the Royal Palaces of Abomey contained elaborate bas-reliefs (noundidė in Fon) providing a record of the king's accomplishments. Each king had his own palace within the palace complex and within the outer walls of their personal palace was a series of clay reliefs designed specific to that king. These were not solely designed for royalty and chiefs, temples, and other important buildings had similar reliefs. The reliefs would present Dahomey kings often in military battles against the Oyo or Mahi tribes to the north of Dahomey with their opponents depicted in various negative depictions (the king of Oyo is depicted in one as a baboon eating a cob of corn). Historical themes dominated representation and characters were basically designed and often assembled on top of each other or in close proximity creating an ensemble effect. In addition to the royal depictions in the reliefs, royal members were depicted in power sculptures known as bocio, which incorporated mixed materials (including metal, wood, beads, cloth, fur, feathers, and bone) onto a base forming a standing figure. The bocio are religiously designed to include different forces together to unlock powerful forces. In addition, the cloth appliqué of Dahomey depicted royalty often in similar zoomorphic representation and dealt with matters similar to the reliefs, often the kings leading during warfare.

Dahomey had a distinctive tradition of casting small brass figures of animals or people, which were worn as jewellery or displayed in the homes of the relatively well-off. These figures, which continue to be made for the tourist trade, were relatively unusual in traditional African art in having no religious aspect, being purely decorative, as well as indicative of some wealth. Also unusual, by being so early and clearly provenanced, is a carved wooden tray (not dissimilar to much more recent examples) in Ulm, Germany, which was brought to Europe before 1659, when it was described in a printed catalogue.

Wheeled carriages were used in Dahomey after their introduction into the region of modern Benin in the late 17th century. Some carriages were manufactured indigenously while most were obtained as gifts from European allies. The carriages were often used for ceremonial purposes and were drawn mostly by men due to the small number of horses in the state. Carriages in Dahomey came in varying sizes and shapes. Some were modelled after ships, elephants and horses. Burton noted that the road between Abomey and the town of Cana, which was about six to seven miles long, was regularly kept weeded for the convenience of the royal carriages.

== In popular culture ==
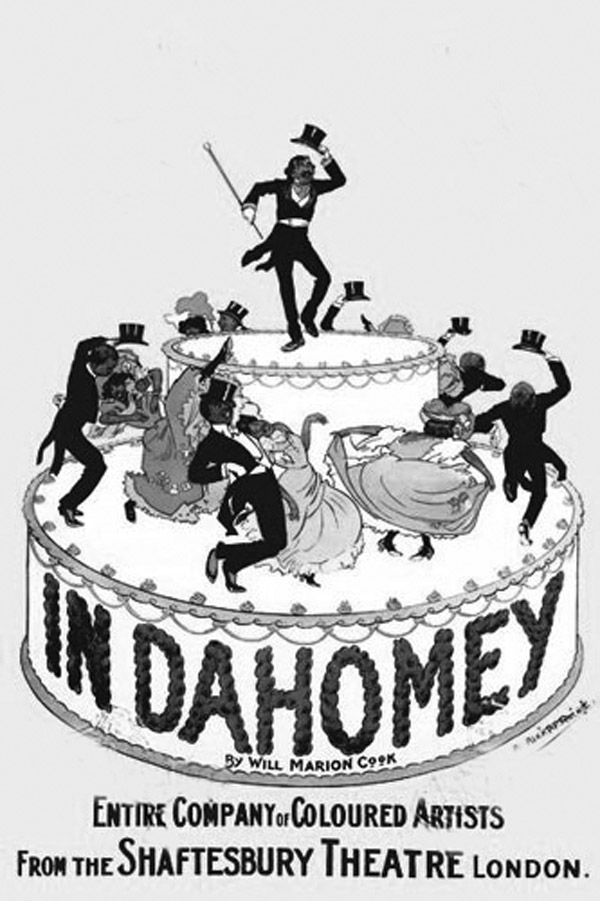
The poster announcing the London premiere of In Dahomey at the Shaftesbury Theatre, 1903

The Kingdom of Dahomey has been depicted in a number of different works of fiction or creative nonfiction.

=== Literature and theatre ===
- In the novel Robur the Conqueror (1886) by Jules Verne, the crew and passengers of the Albatross travel to Dahomey, where they interrupt an act of human sacrifice.
- In Dahomey (1903) was a successful Broadway musical, the first full-length Broadway musical written entirely by African Americans, in the early 20th century.
- Novelist Paul Hazoumé's first novel Doguicimi (1938) was based on decades of research into the oral traditions of the Kingdom of Dahomey during the reign of King Ghezo.
- The anthropologist Judith Gleason wrote a novel, Agõtĩme: Her Legend (1970), centered on one of the wives of a king of Dahomey in the late 18th century, who offends her husband who sells her to slavery in Brazil; she makes a bargain with a vodu (deity), putting her son on the throne of Dahomey and bringing her home.
- Another novel tracing the background of a slave, this time in the United States, was The Dahomean, or The Man from Dahomey (1971), by the African-American novelist Frank Yerby; its hero is an aristocratic warrior.
- In the third of George McDonald Fraser's Flashman novels, Flash for Freedom! (1971), Flashman dabbles in the slave trade and visits Dahomey.
- The Viceroy of Ouidah (1980) by Bruce Chatwin is the story of a Brazilian who, hoping to make his fortune from slave trading, sails to Dahomey in 1812, befriending its unbalanced king and coming to a bad end.
- The main character of one of the two parallel stories in Will Do Magic for Small Change (2016) by Andrea Hairston is Kehinde, a Yoruba woman forced into the Dahomean army; she struggles with divided loyalty, and after the fall of Behanzin, joins a French entertainment troupe who intend to exhibit her as an Amazon at the Chicago World's Fair.
- The Booker Prize-winning novel Girl, Woman, Other (2019) by Bernardine Evaristo features a character named Amma who writes and directs a play titled The Last Amazon of Dahomey.
- Behanzin's resistance to the French attempt to end slave trading and human sacrifice has been central to a number of works. Jean Pliya's first play Kondo le requin (1967), winner of the Grand Prize for African History Literature, tells the story of Behanzin's struggle to maintain the old order. Maryse Condé's novel The Last of the African Kings (1992) similarly focuses on Behanzin's resistance and his exile to the Caribbean. The novel Thread of Gold Beads (2012) by Nike Campbell centers on a daughter of Behanzin; through her eyes, the end of his reign is observed.
- Zora Neale Hurston's book Barracoon: The Story of the Last "Black Cargo", posthumously published May 2018.

=== Film and television ===
- Dahomey's role in the slave trade is the central focus of the film Cobra Verde (1987), directed by Werner Herzog and adapted from the novel The Viceroy of Ouidah (1980). The main protagonist is a fictional Brazilian slave trader who travels to the kingdom, and the character is based upon the historical Brazilian slave trader Francisco Félix de Sousa, who was politically and economically influential in Dahomey during the reigns of King Adandozan and King Ghezo.
- The historical television drama Victoria (2016) portrays the real-life story of Sarah Forbes Bonetta being freed from slavery in Dahomey in season 2 episode 17 ("Comfort and Joy").
- The Dahomey Amazons are depicted in the film The Woman King (2022), directed by Gina Prince-Bythewood.
- A documentary titled Dahomey directed by Mati Diop, an international co-production among France, Senegal and Benin, was selected in the Competition at the 74th Berlin International Film Festival and won the Golden Bear. It is about return of 26 of the royal treasures of the Kingdom of Dahomey to Benin.

=== Video games ===
Dahomey has been depicted in some historical war strategy video games.

- The Dahomey Amazons appear in the historical strategy video game Empire: Total War (2009), developed by Creative Assembly.
- In the grand strategy video games Europa Universalis IV (2013) and Victoria 3 (2022), both developed by Paradox Interactive, Dahomey appears as one of many historical nations that players can play as or interact with.

== See also ==
- Asante people
- Blockade of Africa
