= Do-Aklin =

17th-century founder of the ruling dynasty of Dahomey

- Founder of the ruling dynasty of the Kingdom of Dahomey
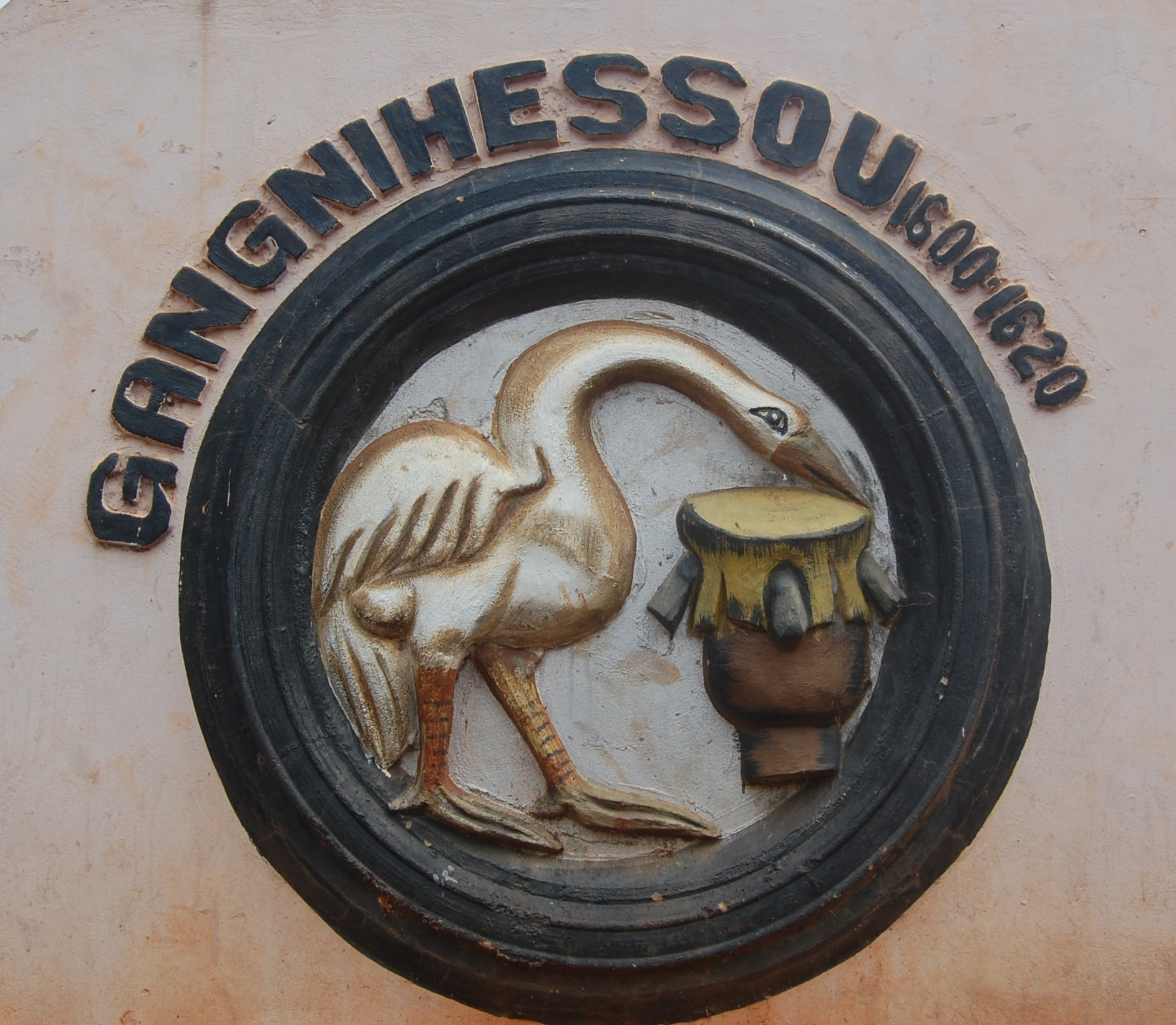
- Symbol of Gangnihessou on the wall of Place Goho in Abomey in Benin in 2020
- Reign: c. 1600-1620
- Successor: Dakodonou
- House: Aladaxonou

Do-Aklin or Gangnihessou (Ganye Hessou) or Dogbari is claimed as the founder of the Fon Kingdom of Dahomey in present-day Benin and the first person in the royal lineage of the Kings of Dahomey (the Aladaxonou dynasty). In many versions he is considered the first king of Dahomey even though the kingdom was founded after his death. Very little is known about Do-Aklin and most of it is connected to folklore, but it is generally claimed that he settled a large group of Aja people from Allada on the Abomey plateau amongst the local inhabitants in c. 1620. His son Dakodonu would eventually build a palace on the plateau and began forming the Kingdom of Dahomey.

== Symbols and motto ==
Gangnihessou had a bird, a drum and a club as his symbol. His motto was that he was the biggest bird and sonorous drum, that nobody can prevent him.

== Settled in Abomey ==
According to oral tradition, the Aja were led to Allada by King Agassu from the city of Tado. Agassu was the son of a Tado princess and a leopard (or in some versions a brave Yoruba hunter). When Agassu tried to take over Tado he was defeated and so instead moved with his followers to found the city of Allada.

Around 1600, three brothers (two in some versions) in the lineage of Agassu fought over the succession to the throne and it was decided that each would settle a new territory. The agreement was reached at Houégbo that Teagbanlin would found a state at what is now Porto-Novo, another son would take control in Allada, and Do-Aklin would settle on the Abomey plateau to the north. It is said that Do-Aklin brought significant gifts for the local population and so was allowed to live amongst them, and the mixing of the local population with the Aja from Allada created the new ethnic group, the Fon.

Do-Aklin's son (or grandson in some versions) Dakodonu became the founder of the palace and the kingdom of Dahomey around 1640 by defeating a local chieftain. Anthropologist J. Cameron Monroe contends that the lineage connections to royalty at Allada is probably a later creation used by Dahomey legitimize its conquest of Allada (since according to the legend, the kings of Dahomey were also legitimate successors to the throne of Allada) and other aspects like its rivalry with Porto-Novo (brotherly rivalry, since according to the legend, the founders of Dahomey and Porto Novo were supposed to be brothers).

== See also ==
- History of the Kingdom of Dahomey
- King of Dahomey
- Gbe languages

Regnal titles
Preceded by --	King of Dahomey c. 1600-1625	Succeeded by Dakodonu
