= Earth religion =

Religion venerating the Earth and nature

Earth religion or nature worship is a system of religion based on the veneration of natural phenomena. It covers any religion that worships the earth, nature, or fertility deity, such as the various forms of goddess worship or matriarchal religion. Some find a connection between earth-worship and the Gaia hypothesis. Earth religions are also formulated to allow one to utilize the knowledge of preserving the earth.

== Origins ==
=== Origin claims by earth religion sources ===
According to Marija Gimbutas, pre-Indo-European societies lived in small-scale, family-based communities that practiced matrilineal succession and goddess-centered religion where creation comes from the woman. She is the Divine Mother who can give life and take it away. In Irish mythology she is Danu, in Slavic mythology she is Mat Zemlya, and in other cultures she is Pachamama, Ninsun, Terra Mater, Nüwa, Matres or Shakti.

In the late 1800s, James Weir wrote an article describing the beginnings and aspects of early religious feeling. According to Boyer, early humans were forced to locate food and shelter in order to survive, while constantly being directed by their instincts and senses. Because their existence depended on nature, humans began to form their religion and beliefs on and around nature itself. It is evident that humanity's first religion would have had to develop from the material world, he argues, because humans relied heavily on their senses. In this sense, the worship of nature formed, allowing humans to further depend on nature for survival.

Neopagans have tried to make claims that religion started in ways that correspond to earth religion. In one of their published works, The Urantia Book, another reason for this worship of nature came from a fear of the world around primitive man. His mind lacked the complex function of processing and sifting through complex ideas. As a result, man worshiped the very entity that surrounded him every day. That entity was nature. Humans experienced the different natural phenomena around him, such as storms, vast deserts, and immense mountains. Among the first parts of nature to be worshiped were rocks and hills, plants and trees, animals, the elements, heavenly bodies, and even man himself. As primitive man worked his way through nature worship, he eventually moved on to incorporate spirits into his worship.

The origins of religion can be looked at through the lens of the function and processing of the human mind. Pascal Boyer suggests that, for the longest period of time, the brain was thought of as a simple organ of the body. However, he claims that the more information collected about the brain indicates that the brain is indeed not a "blank slate." Humans do not just learn any information from the environment and surroundings around them. They have acquired sophisticated cognitive equipment that prepares them to analyze information in their culture and determine which information is relevant and how to apply it. Boyer states that "having a normal human brain does not imply that you have religion. All it implies is that people can acquire it, which is very different." He suggests that religions started for the reasons of providing answers to humans, giving comfort, providing social order to society, and satisfying the need of the illusion-prone nature of the human mind. Ultimately, religion came into existence because of our need to answer questions and hold together our societal order.

An additional idea on the origins of religion comes not from man's cognitive development, but from the ape. Barbara J. King argues that human beings have an emotional connection with those around them, and that that desire for a connection came from their evolution from apes. The closest relative to the human species is the African chimpanzee. At birth, the ape begins negotiating with its mother about what it wants and needs in order to survive. The world the ape is born into is saturated with close family and friends. Because of this, emotions and relationships play a huge role in the ape's life. Its reactions and responses to one another are rooted and grounded in a sense of belongingness, which is derived from its dependence on the ape's mother and family. Belongingness is defined as "mattering to someone who matters to you ... getting positive feelings from our relationships." This sense and desire for belongingness, which started in apes, only grew as the hominid (a human ancestor) diverged from the lineage of the ape, which occurred roughly six to seven million years ago.

As severe changes in the environment, physical evolutions in the human body (especially in the development of the human brain), and changes in social actions occurred, humans went beyond trying to simply form bonds and relationships of empathy with others. As their culture and society became more complex, they began using practices and various symbols to make sense of the natural and spiritual world around them. Instead of simply trying to find belongingness and empathy from the relationships with others, humans created and evolved God and spirits in order to fulfil that need and exploration. King argued that "an earthly need for belonging led to human religious imagination and thus to the otherworldly realm of relating to God, gods, and spirits."

== Encompassed religions ==
The term 'earth religion' encompasses any religion that worships the earth, nature, or fertility gods or goddesses. There is an array of groups and beliefs that fall under earth religion, such as paganism, which is a polytheistic, nature-based religion; animism, which posits that all living entities (plants, animals, and humans) possess a spirit; Wicca, which holds the concept of an earth mother goddess as well as practices ritual magic; and Druidism, which equates divinity with the natural world.

Another perspective of earth religion to consider is pantheism, which takes a varied approach to the importance and purpose of the earth and to the relationship of humans with the planet. Several of their core statements deal with the connectivity humans share with the planet, declaring that "all matter, energy, and life are an interconnected unity of which we are an inseparable part" and "we are an integral part of Nature, which we should cherish, revere, and preserve in all its magnificent beauty and diversity. We should strive to live in harmony with Nature locally and globally".

The earth also plays a vital role for many Voltaic peoples, many of whom "consider the Earth to be Heaven's wife", such as the Konkomba of northern Ghana, whose economic, social, and religious life is heavily influenced by the earth. It is also important to consider various Native American religions, such as the Peyote Religion, Longhouse Religion, and Earth Lodge Religion.

== Around the world ==
April 22 was established as International Mother Earth Day by the United Nations in 2009, but many cultures around the world have been celebrating the Earth for thousands of years. Winter solstice and Summer solstice are celebrated with holidays like Yule and Dongzhi in the winter and Tiregān and Kupala in the summer.

=== Africa ===
Animism is practiced among some Bantu peoples of Sub-Saharan Africa. The Dahomey mythology has deities like Nana Buluku, Gleti, Mawu, Asase Yaa, Naa Nyonmo and Xɛvioso.

=== Europe ===
In Baltic mythology, the sun is a female deity, Saulė, a mother or a bride, and Mēness is the moon, father or husband, their children being the stars. In Slavic mythology Mokosh and Mat Zemlya together with Perun head up the pantheon. Celebrations and rituals are centered on nature and harvest seasons. Dragobete is a traditional Romanian spring holiday that celebrates "the day when the birds are betrothed."

=== India ===
In Hindu philosophy, the yoni is the creative power of nature and the origin of life. In Shaktism, the yoni is celebrated and worshipped during the Ambubachi Mela, an annual fertility festival which celebrates the Earth's menstruation.

=== Taiwan ===
In Taiwan, Tudi Gong (土地公, lit. Earth God) is considered the busiest and most "close to the people" deity in the island’s spiritual framework. Tudi Gong operates like a cosmic community patriarch who can be petitioned for everything from passing school exams to family harmony.

=== Singapore ===
In Singapore, the Earth God is primarily worshipped as Tua Pek Kong (aka Tu Di Gong), a highly revered Taoist deity of the land, wealth, and local protection. From small community altars to large-scale historical temples, the Earth God's image is enshrined in thousands of places on the island.

=== China ===
In Teochew culture of Guangdong, China, Bogong (伯公) is the most affectionate folk title for the Earth God. Bogong is a grassroots deity who protects the land, blesses the harvest, and ensures the safety of people and livestock, and holds a very high position of faith in the lives of Chaoshan people.

== Popular culture ==
Although the idea of earth religion has been around for thousands of years, its presence in popular culture became more pronounced in the early 1990s. "The X-Files" was one of the first nationally broadcast television programs to air witchcraft and Wicca (types of earth religion) content, particularly in episodes like "Die Hand Die Verletzt" and "Clyde Bruckman's Final Repose". On average, Wiccans—those who practice Wicca—were more or less pleased with the way the show had portrayed their ideals and beliefs, though they found it to be a little "sensationalistic". That same year, the movie "The Craft" was released, also depicting the art of Wicca. Unlike "The X-Files", this cinematic feature faced mixed reviews from the Earth Religion community due to its sensationalized portrayal of witchcraft.

A few years later, programs such as "Charmed" and "Buffy the Vampire Slayer" became widely popular, further introducing audiences to Earth Religion themes. "Charmed", although focused mostly on witchcraft, portrayed magic that closely resembled Wiccan practices. Meanwhile, "Buffy" was notable for casting a Wiccan character, Willow Rosenberg, albeit within a fantastical context given the show's focus on vampires.

The genre of Earth Religion in popular culture expanded with films by director Hayao Miyazaki, like "Princess Mononoke" and "My Neighbor Totoro", which delve into human interaction with nature spirits. These films were lauded for their respectful and intricate depiction of Earth Religion themes, both in Japan and internationally.

Disney films such as "The Lion King" and "Brother Bear" have also been identified with Earth Religion themes due to their exploration of the "interconnectedness" and "Circle of Life" between animals, plants, and life in general. These films illustrate the consequences when the harmony between humans and nature is disrupted, resonating with Earth Religion principles.

Other films like "The 13th Warrior", "The Deceivers", "Sorceress" (1982), "Anchoress", "Eye of the Devil", "Agora", and "The Wicker Man" (1973) have also explored earth religion and nature worship. Each film, with its unique narrative and setting, contributes to the diverse portrayal of Earth Religion in popular culture. For instance, the religious aspect in "The Deceivers" is primarily embodied by the Thuggee cult's worship of the goddess Kali, a deity in Hinduism. Although Kali worship is a part of Hindu tradition, the portrayal in the movie is associated with violence, robbery, and ritualistic murders carried out by the Thuggee cult, which is far from a representation of Earth religion or a reverence for nature. Moreover, the Thugs' criminal activities and the religious fanaticism depicted in the movie serve as a plot device to drive the narrative forward, rather than an exploration or demonstration of Earth religion. The focus of "The Deceivers" lies more on the historical thriller aspect, religious fanaticism, and the moral dilemmas faced by the protagonist, rather than on exhibiting practices or ideologies typically associated with Earth religion.

Similarly, online communities and social media platforms are used to discuss and spread Earth Religion ideas. By doing so, people are able to foster a global dialogue, enhancing the representation of Earth Religion in digital popular culture.

Video Games: Video games such as "The Elder Scrolls" series and "Final Fantasy" have woven Earth Religion themes into their narratives, offering players an interactive medium to explore these ideas.

Impact on Public Perception: The portrayal of Earth Religion in popular culture has played a significant role in shaping public perception. While some portrayals have been commended for their accuracy and depth, others have been criticized for perpetuating stereotypes and misconceptions.

== Core beliefs and practices ==
- Veneration of nature:
  - Earth-centered religions or nature worship are systems of religion based on the veneration of natural phenomena, including the earth, nature, and fertility deities.
  - The veneration of the planet and nature has been integral to various religions and spiritual practices throughout history. Adherents to earth religions subscribe to a belief system based on the preservation and reverence for natural phenomena.
- Diversity of beliefs and practices:
  - Earth religion encompasses a range of groups and beliefs such as paganism (a polytheistic, nature-based religion), animism (the worldview that all living entities possess a spirit), Wicca (which holds the concept of an earth mother goddess and practices ritual magic), and druidism (which equates divinity with the natural world).
- Connection with Earth:
  - Core statements of some earth religions emphasize the connectivity humans share with the planet, declaring that "all matter, energy, and life are an interconnected unity of which we are an inseparable part" and advocate for living in harmony with nature both locally and globally.
- Cultural variations:
  - The earth plays a vital role in many cultures; for example, some Voltaic peoples consider the Earth to be Heaven's wife, and their economic, social, and religious life is heavily influenced by the earth. Native American religions, such as the Peyote Religion, Longhouse Religion, and Earth Lodge Religion, also have earth-centric beliefs and practices.
- Incorporation of fertility deities:
  - Worship of fertility gods or goddesses is a common practice within many earth religions, which often have roots in ancient goddess worship or matriarchal religions.
- Environmental stewardship:
  - Earth religions often promote practices that are aimed at preserving the earth and its ecosystems, aligning with conservationist and environmentalist principles.
- Integration of ancient and neo-pagan practices:
  - Many earth religions draw from ancient pagan practices, integrating old and neo-pagan earth religions and often including a variety of life-affirming faiths dedicated to healing both individuals and the Earth.
- Gaia hypothesis connection:
  - Some individuals find a connection between earth worship and the Gaia hypothesis, which proposes that the Earth is a self-regulating complex system.

== Controversy and criticism ==
=== Hindrance of progress ===
Many religions have negative stereotypes of earth religion and neo-paganism in general. A common critique of the worship of nature and resources of "Mother Earth" is that the rights of nature and anti-ecocide movements are inhibitors of human progress and development. This argument is fueled by the fact that those people socialized into 'western' world views believe the earth itself is not a living being. Wesley Smith (of the conservative Discovery Institute which advocates for Intelligent Design ) believes this is "anti-humanism with the potential to do real harm to the human family". According to Smith, earth worshipers are hindering large-scale development, and they are viewed as inhibitors of advancement.

=== Negative representatives ===
Much of the criticism directed towards earth religion stems from the adverse actions of a handful of individuals who have faced reproach for their deeds. A notable figure often cited as a negative representation of earth religion is Aleister Crowley. He is critiqued for being "too preoccupied with awakening magical powers" rather than prioritizing the well-being of others in his coven. Crowley is purported to have admired "Old George" Pickingill, another nature worshipper who garnered negative attention. Critics labeled Pickingill as a Satanist and "England's most notorious Witch."

Crowley was "allegedly expelled from the Craft due to his perverse tendencies." He exhibited arousal towards torture and pain, and took pleasure in being "punished" by women. These behaviors severely tarnished Crowley's public image and, by extension, cast a shadow over earth religion, leading to a misperception where many began to associate all followers of earth religion with perverse Satanism."

=== Accused of Satanism ===
Followers of earth religion have suffered major opprobrium over the years for allegedly being Satanists. Some religious adherents can be prone to viewing religions other than their religion as being wrong sometimes because they perceive those religions as characteristic of their concept of Satan worship. To wit, Witchcraft, a common practice of Wiccans, is sometimes misinterpreted as Satan worship by members of these groups, as well as less-informed persons who may not be specifically religious but who may reside within the sphere-of-influence of pagan-critical religious adherents. From the Wiccan perspective, however, earth religion and Wicca lie outside of the phenomenological world that encompasses Satanism. An all-evil being does not exist within the religious perspective of western earth religions. Devotees worship and celebrate earth resources and earth-centric deities. Satanism and Wicca "have entirely different beliefs about deity, different rules for ethical behavior, different expectations from their membership, different views of the universe, different seasonal days of celebration, etc."

Neo-pagans, or earth religion followers, often claim to be unaffiliated with Satanism. Neo-pagans, Wiccans, and earth religion believers do not acknowledge the existence of a deity that conforms to the common Semitic sect religious concept of Satan. Satanism stems from Christianity, while earth religion stems from older religious concepts.

==== Accusations of Satanism as religious harassment ====
Some earth religion adherents take issue with the religious harassment that is inherent in the social pressure that necessitates their having to distance themselves from the often non-uniform, Semitic sect religious concept of Satan worship. Having to define themselves as "other" from a religious concept that is not within their worldview implies a certain degree of outsider-facilitated, informal, but functional religious restriction that is based solely on the metaphysical and mythological religious beliefs of those outsiders. This is problematic because outsider initiated comparisons to Satanism with the intent of condemnation, even when easily refuted, can have the effect of social pressure on earth religion adherents to conform to outsider perception of acceptable customs, beliefs, and modes of religious behavior.

To illustrate, a problem could arise with the "other" than Satanism argument if an earth centered belief system adopted a holiday that a critic considered to be similar or identical to a holiday that Satanists celebrate. Satanists have historically been prone to adopting holidays that have origins in various pagan traditions, ostensibly because these traditional holidays are amongst the last known vestiges of traditional pre-Semitic religious practice in the west. Satanists are, perhaps irrationally, prone to interpreting non-Semitic holidays as anti-Christian and therefore as implicitly representative of their worldview. This is not surprising given the fact that this is, in fact, how many Christians interpret holidays such as Samhain. In spite of any flawed perceptions or rationale held by any other group, earth centered religion adherents do not recognize misinterpretation of their customs made by outside religious adherents or critics inclusive of Satan worshippers.

Organized Satan worship, as defined by and anchored in the Semitic worldview, is characterized by a relatively disorganized and often disparate series of movements and groups that mostly emerged in the mid-20th century. Thus, their adopted customs have varied, continue to vary, and therefore this moving target of beliefs and customs can not be justifiably nor continuously accounted for by earth centered religious adherents. Once a Satanist group adopts a holiday, social stigma may unjustifiably taint the holiday and anyone who observes it without discrimination as to whence and for what purpose it was originally celebrated. Given these facts, many earth centered religion devotees find comparisons to Satanism intrinsically oppressive in nature. This logic transfers to any and all religious customs to include prayer, magic, ceremony, and any unintentional similarity in deity characteristics (an example is the horned traditional entity Pan having similar physical characteristics to common horned depictions of Satan).

The issue is further complicated by the theory that the intra and extra-biblical mythology of Satan that is present throughout various Semitic sects may have originally evolved to figuratively demonize the heathen religions of other groups. Thus, the concept of Satan, or "the adversary", would have been representative of all non-Semitic religions and, by extension, the people who believed in them. Although, at times, the concept of the "other" as demonic has also been used to characterize competing Semitic sects. Amongst other purposes, such belief would have been extraordinarily useful during the psychological and physical process of cleansing Europe of traditional tribal beliefs in favor of Christianity. This possibility would account for the historical tendency of Christian authorities, for example, to deem most pagan customs carried out in the pagan religious context as demonic. By any modern standard, such current beliefs would violate western concepts of religious tolerance as well as be inimical to the preservation of what remains of the culture of long-persecuted religious groups.

== Ethics ==
Because of the vast diversity of religions that fall under the title of earth religion there is no consensus of beliefs. However, the ethical beliefs of most religions overlap. The most well-known ethical code is the Wiccan Rede. Many of those who practice an earth religion choose to be environmentally active. Some perform activities such as recycling or composting while others feel it to be more productive to try and support the earth spiritually. These six beliefs about ethics seem to be universal.

1. There is no divine judgement
2. It is up to each individual to decide what is ethical
3. Each individual is responsible for his or her actions
4. Nature and all life should be honored
5. There is no one correct path or religion, only that which fits best for each individual
6. Moral doings are done for their own sake and not for a reward

=== The Wiccan Rede ===
"An [if] it harm none, do what ye will."
Commonly worded in modern English as "if it doesn't harm anyone, do what you want." This maxim was first printed in 1964, after being spoken by the priestess Doreen Valiente in the mid-20th century, and governs most ethical belief of Wiccans and some Pagans. There is no consensus of beliefs but this rede provides a starting point for most people's interpretation of what is ethical. The rede clearly states to do no harm but what constitutes as harm and what level of self-interest is acceptable is negotiable. Many Wiccans reverse the phrase into "Do what ye will an it harm none," meaning "Do what you want if it doesn't harm anyone." The difference may not seem significant but it is. The first implies that it is good to do no harm but does not say that it is necessarily unethical to do so, the second implies that all forms of harm are unethical. The second phrase is nearly impossible to follow. This shift occurred when trying to better adapt the phrase into modern English as well as to stress the "harmlessness" of Wiccans. The true nature of the rede simply implies that there is personal responsibility for your actions. You may do as you wish but there is a karma reaction from every action. Even though this is the most well-known rede of practice, it does not mean that those that choose not to follow it are unethical. There are many other laws of practice that other groups follow.

=== The Threefold Law ===
The Threefold Law is the belief that for all actions there is always a cause and effect. For every action taken either the good or ill intention will be returned to the action taker threefold. This is why the Wiccan Rede is typically followed because of fear of the threefold return from that harmful action.

=== Honor ===
This term is what Emma Restall Orr calls reverence for the earth in her book Living with Honour: A Pagan Ethics. She separates the term into three sections: courage, generosity and loyalty, or honesty, respect and responsibility. There is no evil force in Nature. Nothing exists beyond the natural, therefore it is up to the individual to choose to be ethical not because of divine judgment. All beings are connected by the earth and so all should be treated fairly. There is a responsibility toward the environment and a harmony should be found with nature.

=== The Earth Religion Anti-Abuse Resolution (1988) ===
In 1988, a significant resolution titled the Earth Religion Anti-Abuse Resolution was drafted and approved by various Pagan communities to address concerns of abuse and misrepresentation. This resolution was initially penned by the Church of All Worlds and later garnered approval from the Pagan Ecumenical Conferences of Ancient Ways (held in California from May 27 to May 30) and the Pagan Spirit Gathering (held in Wisconsin on June 17). Following these affirmations, the Pagan Community Council of Ohio presented the resolution to the Northeast Council of W.I.C.C.A., further solidifying its acceptance within the broader Pagan community.

The text of the resolution reads as follows:

"We, the undersigned, as adherents of Pagan and Old and Neo-Pagan Earth Religions, including Wicca or Witchcraft, practice a variety of positive, life-affirming faiths that are dedicated to healing, both of ourselves and of the Earth. As such, we do not advocate or condone any acts that victimize others, including those proscribed by law. One of our most widely accepted precepts is the Wiccan Rede's injunction to "harm none," and thus, we vehemently condemn practices of child abuse, sexual abuse, and any other form of abuse that inflicts harm on the bodies, minds, or spirits of the victims. We recognize and revere the divinity of Nature in our Mother the Earth, and we conduct our rites of worship in a manner that is ethical, compassionate, and constitutionally protected. Contrary to misconceptions, we neither acknowledge nor worship the Christian devil, "Satan," as he is not a part of our Pagan pantheons. We strongly oppose slander or libel against our Temples, clergy, or Temple Assemblers and are prepared to defend our civil rights through legal action as deemed necessary and appropriate."

This resolution was a significant step towards addressing and condemning abusive practices while also aiming to dispel common misconceptions and stereotypes associated with Earth Religions, particularly Wicca and Witchcraft. It also highlighted the collective stance of the Pagan community against abuse and their commitment to ethical and compassionate practices.
