= Loko =

Loko may refer to:

- Port Loko, Sierra Leone, Africa
- Loko people, a people of Sierra Leone
- Loko language, a language of Sierra Leone
- Loco (loa) or Loko, a figure in Haitian Vodou belief
- Loko, a goddess in Dahomey mythology
- Lokomotiv (disambiguation), several sport clubs sometimes abbreviated as Loko
- Loko, Estonia, a village in Põlva Parish, Põlva County, Estonia
- Loko, Nasarawa, a town in Nasarawa State, Nigeria
- Four Loko, a line of alcoholic beverages, originally marketed as energy drinks
- David Loko, Papua New Guinean former rugby league player
- Jacob Loko (born 1992), Australian rugby league player
- Patrice Loko (born 1970), French former footballer
- EL Loko (1950–2016), Togolese artist

== See also ==
- Loco (disambiguation)
