= Loco =

Loco or El Loco may refer to:

== Places ==
=== United States ===
- Loco, Georgia, an unincorporated community
- Loco, Oklahoma, a village
- Loco, Texas, an unincorporated community
- Loco River, Puerto Rico

=== Elsewhere ===
- Loco, Switzerland, a village and former municipality

== People ==
- Loco (Apache) (1823–1905), Apache chief
- Loco (nickname), a list of people known as "Loco" or "El Loco"
- Joe Loco (1921–1988), American jazz and pop pianist and arranger
- Loco (rapper) (born 1989), South Korean rapper
- Locó (footballer) (born 1984), Angolan footballer Manuel Armindo Morais Cange
- Daniel Barrera Barrera (born c. 1968), Colombian drug lord also known as El Loco

== Arts and entertainment ==
=== Amusement park attractions ===
- El Loco (Adventuredome), a roller coaster at Adventuredome in Las Vegas
- El Loco (roller coaster), a type of roller coaster manufactured by S&S Worldwide

=== Fictional characters ===
- Loco (Gobots), in the Gobots toy line
- Loco, a grasshopper in the 1998 animated film A Bug's Life
- Loco, in the spaghetti western film The Great Silence (1968), portrayed by Klaus Kinski
- Loco, a character in the 1953 film How to Marry a Millionaire, played by Betty Grable

=== Games ===
- Loco (video game), a 1984 game for the Commodore 64
- Lego Loco, a 1998 children's computer game

=== Music ===
- loco, a musical term meaning "in place"

==== Albums ====
- Loco (Fun Lovin' Criminals album), 2001
- Loco (God album), 1991
- El Loco, a 1981 album by American rock band ZZ Top

==== Songs ====
- "Loco" (Coal Chamber song), 1997
- "Loco" (David Lee Murphy song), 2004
- "Loco" (Enrique Iglesias song), 2013
- "Loco" (Fun Lovin' Criminals song), 2001
- "Loco" (Joel Fletcher song), 2014
- "Loco" (Jowell & Randy song), 2010
- "Loco" (Itzy song), 2021
- "Loco" (Netón Vega song), 2024
- Loco (composition), an orchestral composition by Jennifer Higdon
- "Loco", a 1999 song by Mexican singer Alejandro Fernández from the album Mi Verdad
- "Loco", a 2009 song by Annie from Don't Stop
- "Loco", a 1961 song by Bill Smith Combo
- "Loco", a 2008 song by Magán & Rodríguez
- "Loco", a 2012 song by Maluma from Magia
- "Loco", a 2007 song by The Ripps
- "El Loco", a 2001 song by Babasónicos from Jessico

== Computing ==
- LOCO-1, a near-lossless image compression algorithm used in JPEG

== Other uses ==
- Loco (loa), a loa (spirit) in the Voodoo religion
- Locomotive
- Locoweed (loco), a common name in North America for a number of poisonous plants that cause addiction and delirium in livestock
- Concholepas concholepas, a mollusk species called loco in Chile

== See also ==
- "Loco loco", a 2021 song by Serbian girl group Hurricane
- LOCOS (LOCal Oxidation of Silicon), a microfabrication process
- Las Vegas Locomotives (Locos), a defunct United Football League team
- Locoweed, an American term for some intoxicating plants, also slang for marijuana
- Loko (disambiguation)
