= Ayizan =

Vodou goddess

- marketplaces, commerce, priestly knowledge, mysteries
- Veve of Ayizan
- Venerated in: Vodou, Folk Catholicism, West African Vodun, Winti
- Attributes: palm frond, silver, blue, white

Ayizan (also Grande Ai-Zan, Aizan, or Ayizan Velekete, Aisa, Mama Aisa) is the loa of the marketplace and commerce in Vodou, especially in Benin, Haiti and Suriname.

== Background ==
She is a racine, or root loa, associated with Vodoun rites of initiation (called kanzo). Just as her husband Loko is the archetypal houngan (priest), Ayizan is regarded as the first, or archetypal, mambo (priestess), and as such is also associated with priestly knowledge and mysteries, particularly those of initiation and the natural world.

As the spiritual parents of the priesthood, she and her husband are two of the loa involved in the kanzo rites in which the priest/ess-to-be is given the asson (sacred rattle and tool of the priesthood) and are both powerful guardians of "reglemen" or the correct and appropriate form of Vodoun service.

She is syncretized with the Catholic Saint Clare. Her symbol is the palm frond, and she drinks no alcohol. Her colors are most commonly silver, blue, and white.
