= Xɛvioso =

God of thunder in Dahomey mythology

Xɛvioso (Maxi Xɛ̀vioso, Fon variously Xɛviosò, Xɛviesò or Xɛbiosò, Ewe Xebioso, borrowed into Yoruba as Xεbiosò; variously rendered Xevioso, Xewioso, Hevioso, Hèvioso, Heviosso and Hebioso) is a god of thunder in Ewe and Dahomean religion.

== Overview ==
Xɛvioso is an African voodoo deity of thunder, worshipped in West Africa. He is the god of thunder, lightning and rain. Known to populations of southern Benin, Xɛvioso is a righteous God. He chastises liars, thieves and villains by smiting them. In certain places the bas-reliefs of the temples of Xɛvioso represent this God in the form of a man who slaughtered at these feet a living being with an ax. He is the twin brother of Gun, and is one of the children of Mawu and Lisa.

== Divinity ==
Xɛvioso forms a large family of smaller voduns and belongs to the category of so-called heavenly voduns (ji-vodun). Death by lightning is considered a punishment in West Africa. Xɛvioso is just, he punishes without mercy. People killed by lightning cannot have a normal burial. The remains of a person killed by lightning are ritually burned, the bones are kept. In some regions of Benin, the body is displayed in front of a temple dedicated to Xɛvioso. An event in which a person survives being struck by lightning is understood quite differently. This marks him as the spiritually chosen one and is considered the direct incarnation of vodun Xɛvioso. Xɛvioso cooperates significantly with the earth vodun Sakpata (Sopona in Yoruba religion), to whom he sends beneficial rain. Xɛvioso and Sakpata are supposed to be brothers, both of a very violent nature; when they quarrel and argue with each other, it causes long periods of drought, crop failure, but also infertility for women.

If Xɛvioso's lightning strikes a house and it catches fire, people must not put it out, they must call a priest of the Xɛvioso cult, and the building must not be reconstructed before the rite of atonement, otherwise the deity's wrath might spread to other people. Priests on the spot investigate the causes using the divination system fa. A storm rich in lightning always brings with it some form of victim; proof is the black sokpe stones that people look for after a storm. According to the believers, they fall during the rampage of the thunder lord Xɛvioso. Sokpe stones contain divine power called àzě (aṣẹ).

In Benin, in connection with the Xɛvioso cult, ritual axes can be seen with one or more crescent-shaped blades attached to each other. The shape of these blades is also a symbol used on items that refer to the vodun Xɛvioso. The axe is acquired by an initiated member of the cult and used in ceremonies and religious celebrations.

This divinity is also known as Jivodun, that is, Vodun of the rain in Fon.

== Manifestations ==
In Ewe-Fon cosmology, Xevioso (also rendered as Hevioso, Heviosso, or Xebioso) is not a static deity but a dynamic cosmic force that manifests through celestial phenomena, zoomorphic forms, and material artifacts. Because Xevioso represents the divine enforcement of cosmic law (Se), each manifestation carries distinct theological and judicial significance within traditional Vodun practice.

=== Celestial and meteorological phenomena ===
The primary and most direct manifestations of Xevioso occur within atmospheric storms. Traditional practitioners categorize the components of a thunderstorm as specific expressions of the deity's agency:

- Lightning (Soki): Viewed as Xevioso's primary weapon and sight. In theological terms, the sudden illumination of lightning is believed to expose hidden moral transgressions, sorcery, or perjury.
- Thunder (Gbe): Interpreted as the literal voice of the deity. A sudden or unusually loud thunderclap near a community is traditionally understood as an audible warning or a declaration of divine displeasure against a breach of societal taboos.
- Rain (Tsi): Represents the balancing aspect of Xevioso's character. While thunder and lightning manifest his wrath and retributive justice, the subsequent rainfall is viewed as a manifestation of mercy, cooling the heated earth and bringing agricultural fertility.

=== Zoomorphic forms ===
When interacting with the physical world (Xexeme), Xevioso is said to assume specific animal avatars:

- The Ram (Agbo): The ram is the principal zoomorphic manifestation of Xevioso. Ewe-Fon philosophy draws a symbolic parallel between the animal and a storm: the curving horns of the ram visually mirror the trajectory of lightning bolts, while the sonic impact of two rams clashing heads in battle analogizes the sudden, echoing sound of thunder.
- The Firebird: In regional folklore, Xevioso may manifest as a grand bird of prey flying amidst storm clouds. The beating of its wings is mythologized as the source of rumbling thunder, and its sudden dives toward the earth materialize as localized lightning strikes.

=== Material and symbolic manifestations ===
Xevioso's interactions with the terrestrial realm are believed to leave behind physical evidence, which is highly venerated by adherents:

- Thunderstones (Soki-kpe): When lightning strikes a tree, building, or plot of land, priests of the Yeve secret society routinely excavate the site to retrieve prehistoric stone axes (neolithic celts) uncovered by soil erosion. In Ewe-Fon cosmology, these artifacts are categorized as the physical projectiles or "arrows" thrown from the sky by Xevioso to execute judgment.
- The Double-Headed Axe: This is the central iconographic symbol of Xevioso found in shrines and ritual dances. The dual blades symbolize the absolute polarity of his cosmic function: one side represents destruction and fiery judgment (lightning), while the opposite side represents creation, restoration, and life (rain).
- The Thunderbolt: Within Ewe-Fon iconography and cosmology, the thunderbolt represents Xevioso's primary weapon of retributive justice and absolute judicial verdict. It is conceptualized not as a random meteorological event, but as a deliberate, directed strike launched to purge the material world (Xexeme) of corruption, perjury, and spiritual impurity. In shrine art and ritual staffs, its trajectory is visually stylized as a jagged, zigzagging line that serves as a protective glyph, signaling the active enforcement of cosmic law (Se), while any physical site struck by a bolt is viewed as having received an unappealable divine judgment that requires immediate purification by Yeve society priests.

== See also ==
- Shango
