= Nana Buluku =

Female supreme being in the religion of the Fon people and the Ewe people

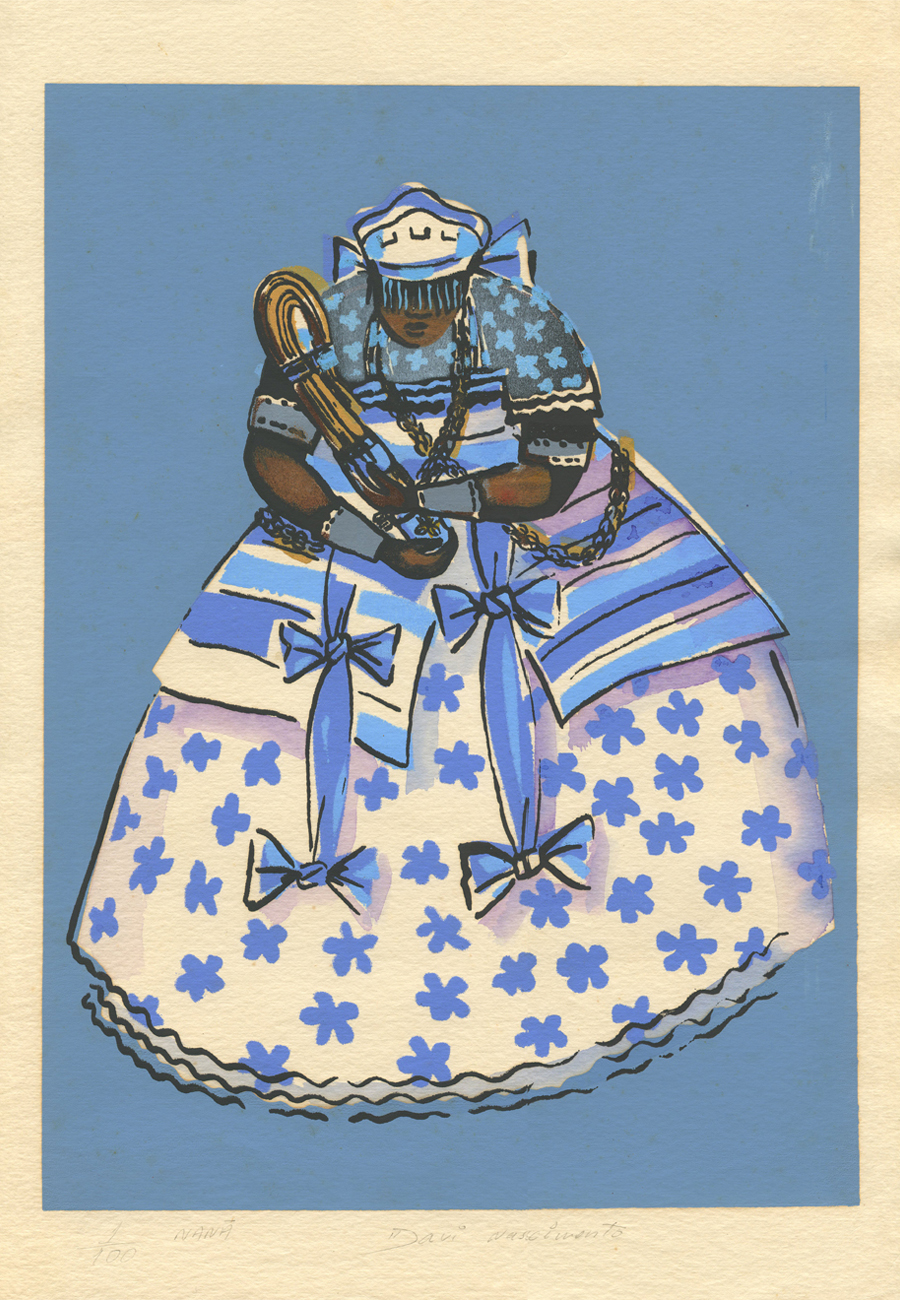
- Nanã as pictured in Candomblé.
- Venerated in: West African Vodun based religions (Candomblé, Louisiana Voodoo, Haitian Vodou) and Dahomean religion

Genealogy
- Children: Mawu-Lisa

Nana Buluku, also known as Nana Buruku, Nana Buku or Nanan-bouclou, is the supreme deity in the West African traditional religion of the Fon people (Benin, Dahomey) and the Ewe people (Togo). She is one of the most influential deities in West African theology, and one shared by many ethnic groups other than the Fon people, albeit with variations. For example, she is called the Nana Bukuu among the Yoruba people and the Olisabuluwa among Igbo people but described differently, with some actively worshiping her while some do not worship her and worship the gods originating from her.

In Dahomey mythology, Nana Buluku is the mother supreme creator who gave birth to the moon spirit Mawu, the sun spirit Lisa, and all of the universe. After giving birth to these, she retired and left the matters of the world to Mawu-Lisa. She is the primary creator, Mawu-Lisa the secondary creator, and the theology based on these is called Vodun, Voodoo or Vodoun.

According to Maya Deren, some Vauduisants believe that Nanan-bouclou is both male and female.

== Observance ==
=== Africa ===
The Vodoun religion of the Fon people has four overlapping elements: public gods, personal or private gods, ancestral spirits, and magic or charms. In this traditional religion of West Africa, creation starts with a female supreme being called Nana Buluku, who gave birth to Mawu and Lisa and created the universe. After giving birth, the mother supreme retired and left everything to Mawu-Lisa (Moon-Sun, female-male), deities, spirits, and inert universe. Mawu-Lisa created numerous minor imperfect deities. In Fon belief, the feminine deity Mawu had to work with the trickster Legba and the snake Aido Hwedo to create living beings, a method of creation that imbued the good, the bad, and a destiny for every creature including human beings. Only by appeasing lesser deities and Legba, in Fon theology, can one change that destiny. This appeasing requires rituals and offerings to the lesser gods and ancestral spirits, who are believed to have the ability to do favors for human beings.

=== Americas ===
As millions of West Africans were captured and enslaved during the colonial era, then shipped across the Atlantic to work on sugarcane, cotton, and tobacco plantations, they brought with them their religious ideas, including those about Nana Buluku. She is celebrated as Nanã in Candomblé Jejé and Tambor de Mina and as Nana Burukú in Candomblé Ketu, where she is pictured as a very old woman, older than creation itself. She is found in French, Dutch, and British West Indies in particular, such as among the African heritage communities of French Guiana, Suriname, Guyana, Brazil, Trinidad, Martinique, Haiti, and other Caribbean islands.

== In popular culture ==
There is a song that was made in the Tamil language with the title "Nana Buluku" (Youtube) and was shown in the movie "Pichaikaran 2" released in the year 2023. The lyrics also mention Nana Buluku as a god and refer to the dancer having a friendship with the god.

== See also ==
- Olodumare
