= Loco (nickname) =

As a nickname, Loco or El Loco may refer to:

- Sebastián Abreu (born 1976), Uruguayan footballer
- Willie Alexander (born 1943), American singer and keyboard player
- Daniel Barrera Barrera, Colombian drug lord arrested in 2012
- Marcelo Bielsa (born 1955), Argentine football coach
- Abdalá Bucaram (born 1952), Ecuadorian politician and President of Ecuador (1996–1997)
- René Higuita (born 1966), Colombian retired football goalkeeper
- Martín Palermo (born 1973), Argentine retired footballer
- Ramón Quiroga (born 1950), Peruvian retired football goalkeeper
- Vicente Rodríguez (baseball) (1891–?), Cuban baseball player in the Negro leagues and other leagues
- Manuel Valdés (born 1931), Mexican actor and comedian
- Juan Manuel Vargas (born 1983), Peruvian footballer
