= Dahomean religion =

Traditional religion of the Dahomey Kingdom

Dahomean religion was a form of West African Vodún practiced by the Fon people of the Dahomey Kingdom, located in present-day Benin. People taken from Dahomey to the Caribbean used elements of the religion to form Haitian Vodou and other African diasporic religions. It is a form of vodu worship, in which the vodu or gods protect and provide for the kingdom, and the dead are deified and incorporated into worship.

The Fon people believed that the physical world was only one part of the greater reality that coexists with vodu and divine ancestors. Dahomean religious ceremonies often included human sacrifice (criminals or prisoners of war) in order to connect with the vodún and ancestors. Dahomean priests would receive guidance from the ancestors through divination and spirit possession. There are thousands of vodu, and they, alongside the deified ancestors, inhabited the ''kutome'' (literally meaning the dead country), which was believed to be a direct mirror of the human world. The hierarchy of Dahomean deities begins with the Great Gods, which themselves are pantheons consisting of many gods. Each individual identified primarily with the cult associated with a specific pantheon that their family or lineage was tied to.

== Cosmology ==
Dahomean cosmology holds that the universe was created by the androgynous deity named Nana Buluku, whose temple was located in the village of Dume, northwest of the Dahomean capital Abomey. Nana Buluku bore twins and divided the world between them. The daughter, named Mawu, is the god of the night and moon, and the son, Lisa, is the god of the day and sun.

Mawu and Lisa bore children: first the androgynous Sogbo, head of the thunder pantheon; then a pair of twins, both named Sagbata, head of the earth pantheon; and then another pair of twins named Agbe, head of the sea pantheon. Then came the deities Gu, Age, Dji, Wete, Medje, Loko, Aizu, Akazu, Alawe, Adjakpa, and Ayaba. These deities represent things such as fire, water, metal, animals, etc. Despite this creation myth, the Dahomey people did not necessarily believe that the universe sprang out of one omnipotent being. Dahomean theology leaves room for cosmological uncertainty.

== The Vodun Pantheon ==
Dahomean theology organizes the vodun into distinct pantheons. The sky pantheon, headed by Mawu-Lisa, has dominion over the sub-pantheons, which the children of Mawu-Lisa head. The three eldest children head the major pantheons: Sogbo is the god of the thunder pantheon, Sagbata is the god of the earth pantheon, and Agbe is the god of the sea pantheon. Sagbata and Xevioso rule the domain of Earth, providing for mankind and also dealing out judgment in the form of death and disease. From Sagbata originates the cult of smallpox, which held that the gods punished misdeeds through diseases like smallpox.

Each cult worshipped its own pantheon of gods, told different myths, and oftentimes, gods would have slightly different names based on locality. Another important figure in Dahomean religion is Legba, or the divine trickster, who is viewed as the connection between men and gods. Legba connects directly to Papa Legba, a deity of Haitian Vodou, and Exu, a deity of the Candomblé religion.

== Ancestor veneration ==
Ancestral worship is a crucial part of Dahomean religion. At the foundation of the ancestral cult is the Tohwiyo, the founder of each sib (or family lineage). Each sib traces its lineage back to the union of a supernatural being—such as a horse, leopard, tree, or other entity—with a human. The Tohwiyo is the first human male born from this union and functions as the primary authority of the sib. In addition to the Tohwiyo, other dead ancestors called Tovodu are worshipped like deities.

The eldest man and woman of the sib are the link between the sib and the ancestors, and in daily practice, they consult the ancestors about marriages and journeys, and many other facets of life. Burial rites are also very important to the Fon people; the final burial must be completed within three years of death or the soul will be separated from the sib, becoming a source of harm for living relatives. The largest-scale example of public devotion to the divine ancestors was an annual ceremony sponsored by the king called Hwetanu, which included human and animal sacrifice, military demonstrations, and parades. These ceremonies also served as a forum for political debate and helped shape national unity and political and economic decisions.

== Ceremony and worship ==
Each cult worships in its own cult house (voduno), which is staffed by vodunsi (meaning 'wives of the Vodu'). The cult houses are overseen by secular heads of worship appointed by the king, reflecting the close relationship between religion and politics in Dahomean society. Membership in a cult is obtained through a formal initiation process in which candidates undergo a period of seclusion, which varies in length by pantheon, during which they learn ritual practices, sacred languages, and the specific obligations of their vodún.

== Relation to other religions ==
Dahomean religion is a primary ancestor of several African diasporic religions that emerged in the Americas as a result of the transatlantic slave trade. The port town of Ouidah in the Dahomey Kingdom was one of the most active slave ports, and many enslaved Dahomeans were sent to Haiti, Brazil, and Cuba, where they brought their religious practices with them. The most direct descendant is Haitian Vodou, which takes its name from the Fon word vodu, and adopted several of the Dahomean deities such as Legba. Other religions, such as Arará in Cuba and Candomblé in Brazil, stemmed from Dahomean religion and the transatlantic slave trade.

== See also ==
- West African Vodun
