= Mawu-Lisa =

Creator deity in Dahomey mythology

Mawu-Lisa is a creator deity in Gbe mythology and West African Vodun, particularly of the former Dahomey Kingdom (now Benin). It is a dual deity, formed by Lisa, a god associated with the Sun, and Mawu (alternately: Mahu, Mau), a goddess of the Moon; put together, they are an agender deity. Mawu and Lisa are the children of Nana Buluku, and are the parents of Oba Koso (Shango), known as Hebioso among the Fon.

According to myth, Mawu is the sole creator of human beings from clay, while her husband Lisa was instructed by her to teach humans how to build civilization. As the myth goes, after creating the Earth and all life and everything else on it, Mawu became concerned that it might be too heavy, so she asked the primeval serpent, Aido Hwedo, to curl up beneath the earth and thrust it up in the sky. When she asked Awe, a monkey she had also created, to help out and make some more animals out of clay, he boasted to the other animals and challenged Mawu. Gbadu, one of the first Loa Mawu birthed from her love making with Lisa, saw all the chaos on earth and told her children to go out among the people and remind them that only Mawu herself can give Sekpoli - the breath of life. Gbadu instructed her daughter, Minona, to go out among the people and teach them about the use of palm kernels as omens from Mawu-Lisa. When Awe, the arrogant monkey, climbed up to the heavens to try to show Mawu that he too could give life, he failed miserably. Lisa made him a bowl of porridge with the seed of death in it and reminded him that only his wife Mawu could give life, and that she could also take it away.

It became the state deity of Dahomey, but ultimately, the Mawu-Lisa dyad was not originally a Fon phenomenon, and were deities borrowed from Yoruba culture (cf. § Yoruba roots).

== Etymology ==
Mawu, which translates to "The Unsurpassable One," derives from the Gbe words "Ma," which is a negative marker meaning "not," "cannot," or "does not," and "Wu," meaning "to surpass," "to exceed," and "to excel over." Lisa, however, derives from Òrìṣànlá, another name for the Yoruba creation deity Ọbàtálá, whose divine aspects were merged with Mawu to form a composite deity.

== Yoruba roots of Lisa ==
It has been asserted that the cult of Mawu-Lisa as a dualistic vodun actually derives from Yoruba mythology, i.e. Lisa was originally the male orisha Obatala (aka Osegbo/Oseremagbo),and Yoruba creation and sky deity, who fashioned humans out of clay. However, the Dahomey kingdom (of the Gbe speakers; the Fon people, aka Danxome, later Benin) seized control over parts of historical Yorubaland, and as a consequence,his divine aspects were borrowed and led to the creation of Lisa and the cult of Mawu-Lisa which diffused westwards from Yorubaland into the socio-religious consciousness of the Gbe speaking peoples. (Note: Bay (1998): "Though brought from an area west of Dahomey, Mawu and Lisa were originally linked to Yoruba-speaking cultures to the east...", quoted by Mills) This diffusion into Dahomey first took place around the Agbome (Abomey) plateau.

In Ife, the cultural cradle of the Yoruba, both deities are twinned as Orisa-Yemowo in conjoined temples.

The gradual transformation from the word Orisa to Lisa is in congruence with the general rules of transmutation of borrowed words of Yoruba origin in Gbe lexicons to fit the Fon-Gbe phonology, which are characterized by certain sound shifts such as; the dropping of Initial Vowels i.e Ogun to Gun/Gu, the phoneme [B] to [V] i.e Oba Adjo to Avadjo, and a switch from [R] to [L], i.e Iroko to Loko, and the Akoro/Okoro quarters of Porto-Novo into Aklon.

Both ethnological research/data and oral accounts collected from the Fon themselves attest to these facts. Under the 18th century rule by Tegbesu, the Dahomey kingdom placed the borrowed gods Mawu-Lisa in an inferior hierarchy, i.e., serving the Nesuhwe (Nesuxwe) or divinized ancestors of the royal house. (Note: The pairing of Mawu-Lisa mirrored the pairing of the kpojito (queen mother) Adono with King Agaja.) At the same time ("contemporary with the emergence of the state deity"), "the couple Mawu-Lisa" was elevated to status of the creator of the world, but remained as one creation myths among a number of cosmogonies present in the Kingdom,

The original twinned Mawu-Lisa duplex was groomed into a monotheistic Mawu religion, due to machinations by Christian missionaries according to commentators. Even though mid-17th century Capuchin missionaries translated the Christian God as the male god Lisa (proselytizing in Allada, 1658), by the 19th century, it became common to use Mawu, the goddess's name as the Dahomey equivalent of the One God of Christianity.

More broadly among other Gbe speaking people (i.e., Ewe-Aja-Fon culture area, including the Aja people and Ewe people), Mawu has been elevated to the omnipotent God by the influence of Christian doctrine.

Ethnographer Alfred Burdon Ellis (d. 1894) was initially inclined to attribute the role of the Ashanti-Akan supreme deity Nyankopon as being largely modeled on the Christian Jehovah, (Note: Ellis, A. B. (1887) The Tshi-speaking Peoples of the Gold Coast of West Africa, (London, ), pp. 24 sqq. apud Frazer) but retracted and decided the Ashanti Nyankopon was a confounding with Jehovah, not a conflation. (Note: , pp. 36 sqq. quoted by Frazer.) (Note: anthropologist Robert Sutherland Rattray (d. 1938) also shared the opinion that the Ashanti deity was not derived of Christian influence, quoted by Frazer (1926), pp. 102–103 Rattray had rebuked Ellis on his earlier stance (Frazer, p. 103, n1).) More to the point, Ellis also regarded the Mawu as being conceived of as a deity over the sky or firmament by the of the Ewe prior to their contact with Christianity.
