= Loco (loa) =

Figure in Vodou religion

Loko is a loa, patron of healers and plants, especially trees in the Vodou religion. He is a racine (root) and a rada loa. Among several other loa, he is linked with the poteau mitan or center post in a Vodou peristyle.

He is the husband of the loa Ayizan and just as she is the archetypal mambo (priestess), Loko is considered the first houngan (priest). As the spiritual parents of the priesthood, he and his wife are two of the loa involved in the kanzo initiation rites, in which the priest/ess to be is given the asson (sacred rattle and tool of the priesthood), at least in the asson/asogwe lineage. Although Loko & Ayizan are recognized as the first priest and priestess, different lineages in Vodou and different ways of practicing Vodou in Haiti could vary in their approach to these loa. Both are powerful guardians of "regleman" or the correct and appropriate form of Vodoun service.He is related to the Iroko and the Ceiba pentandra, two sacred trees, one in Africa and one in Mesoamerica.
