= West African Vodún =

African traditional religion

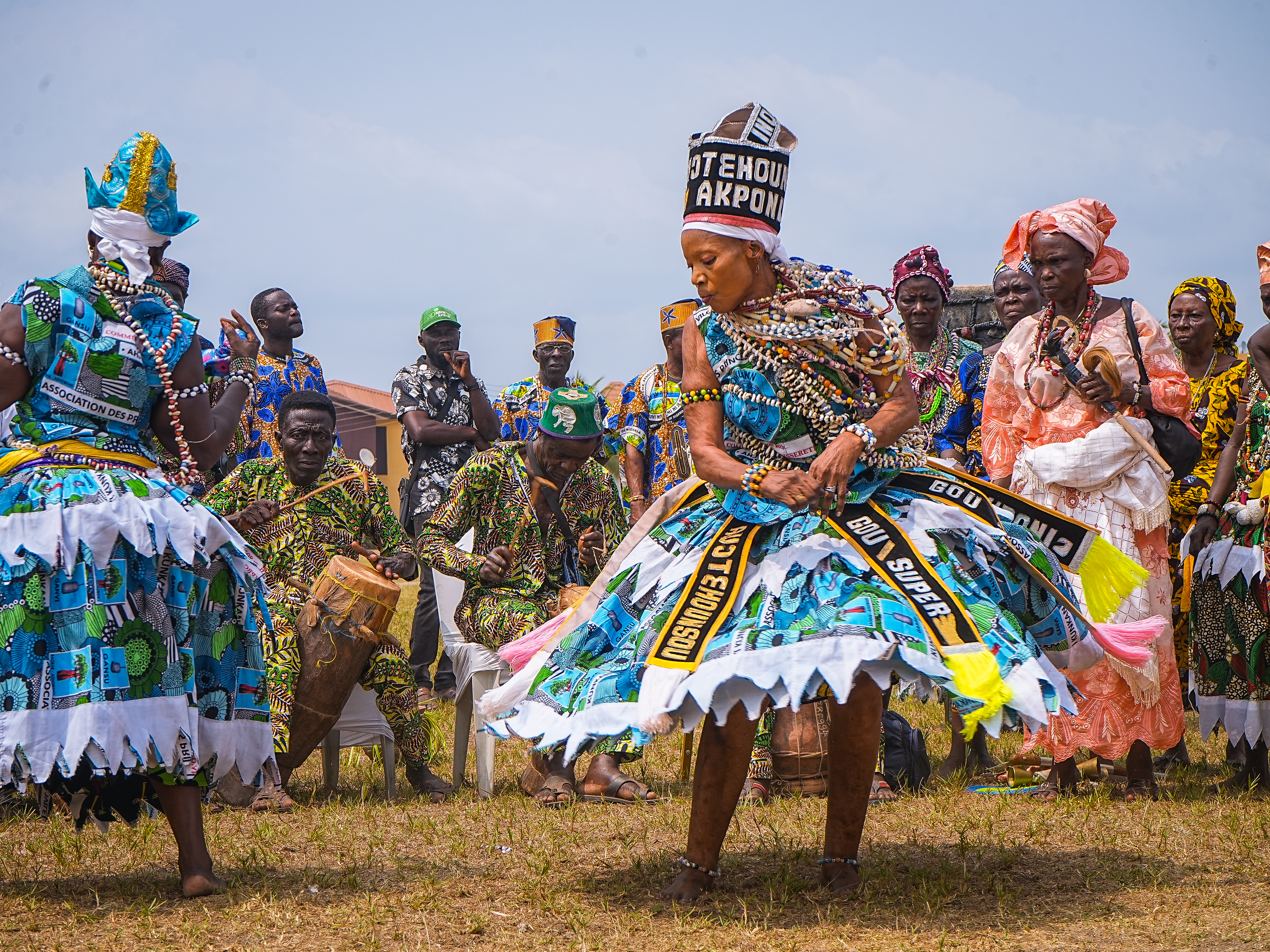
Vodunsis at a ceremony. A Vodunsi is someone belonging to and under the full protection of a Vodun spirit

Vodún, Vodu, or vodunsinsen (Fon: vodúnsínsɛ́n) is an African traditional religion practiced by the Aja, Ewe, and Fon peoples of Benin, Togo, Ghana, and Nigeria. There is no central authority in control of the religion and much diversity exists among practitioners, who are known as vodúnsɛntó or vodúnisants.

Vodún teaches the existence of a supreme creator divinity, under whom are lesser spirits called vodúns. Many of these deities are associated with specific areas, but others are venerated widely throughout West Africa; some have been absorbed from other religions, including Christianity and Hinduism. The vodún are believed to physically manifest in shrines and they are provided with offerings, typically including animal sacrifice. There are several all-male secret societies, including Oró and Egúngún, into which individuals receive initiation. Various forms of divination are used to gain information from the vodún, the most prominent of which is Fá, itself governed by a society of initiates.

The veneration of vodún spirits occurred in West Africa prior to the era of historical documentation. In the 18th century, the Fon-dominated kingdom of Dahomey became a vassal state of the Oyo Empire, facilitating the westward transference of many Yoruba religious traditions to Fon and Ewe populations. This resulted in considerable overlap and similarity with Yoruba religion. Amid the Atlantic slave trade of the 16th to the 19th century, vodúnsɛntó were among the enslaved Africans transported to the Americas. There, their traditional religions influenced the development of new religions such as Haitian Vodou, Louisiana Voodoo, and Brazilian Candomblé Jejé. Attempted suppression of Vodún came with the Christianisation projects of the 19th century and Benin's Marxist government of the mid-20th century. Since the 1990s, there have been growing efforts to encourage foreign tourists to visit West Africa and receive initiation into Vodún.

Many vodúnsɛntó practice their traditional religion alongside Christianity, for instance by interpreting Jesus Christ as a vodún. Although primarily found in West Africa, since the late 20th century the religion has also spread abroad and is practised by people of varied ethnicities and nationalities.

== Definition ==
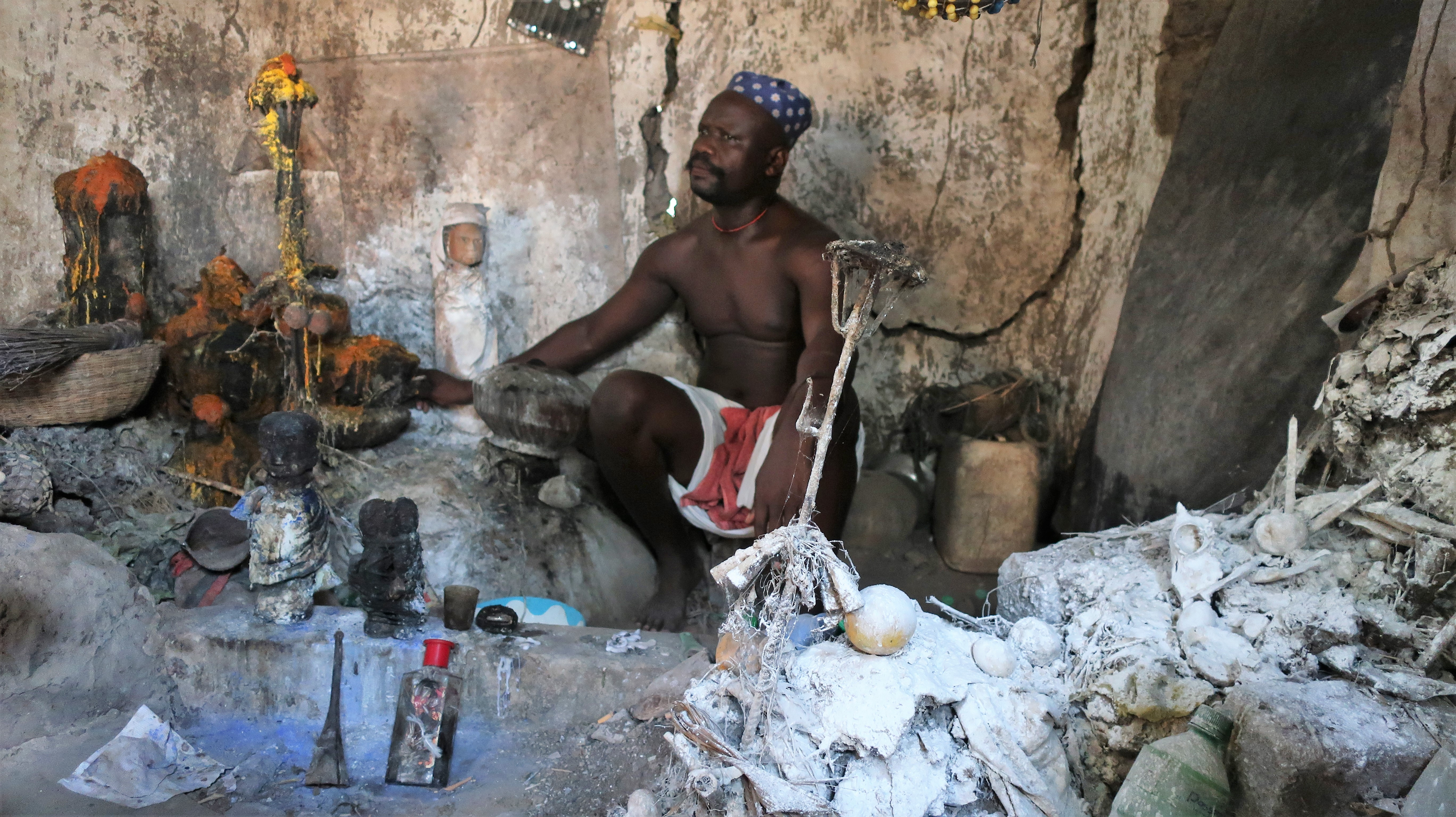
A Vodun priest in Benin photographed in 2018

Vodún is a religion. The anthropologist Timothy R. Landry has argued that, although the term Vodún is commonly used, a more accurate name for the religion was vodúnsínsen, meaning "spirit worship". The spelling "Vodún" is commonly used to distinguish the West African religion from the Haitian religion more usually spelled Vodou; this in turn is often used to differentiate it from Louisiana Voodoo. An alternative spelling sometimes used for the West African religion is "Vodu". The religion's adherents are referred to as vodúnsɛntó or, in the French language, Vodúnisants. Another common term for a practitioner is vodúnsi, meaning "wife of a vodún".

Vodún is "the predominant religious system" of southern Benin, Togo, and parts of southeast Ghana. The anthropologist Judy Rosenthal noted that "Fon and Ewe forms of Vodu worship are virtually the same". It is part of the same network of religions that include Yoruba religion as well as African diasporic traditions such as Haitian Vodou, Cuban Santería, and Brazilian Candomblé. As a result of centuries of interaction between Fon and Yoruba peoples, Landry noted that Vodún and Yoruba religion were "at times, indistinguishable or at least, blurry". Some Fon people even refer to Yoruba religion as "Nago Vodun", "Nago" being a common Fon word for the Yoruba people.

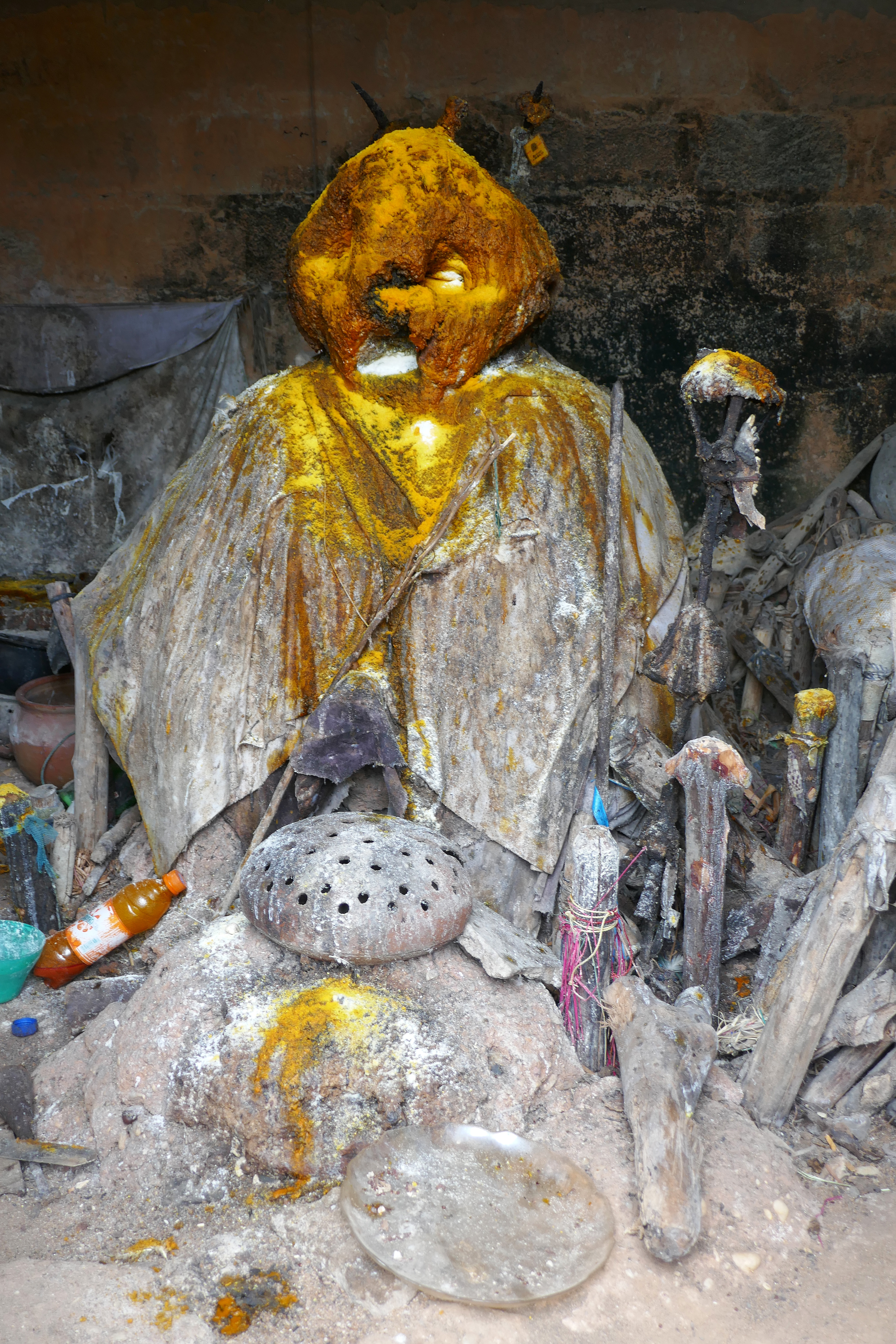
A Vodún shrine in Grand-Popo, Benin, in 2017

Vodún is a fragmented religion divided into "independent small cult units" devoted to particular spirits. Various sub-classifications of the religion have been suggested, but none have come to be regarded as definitive. As a tradition, Vodún is not doctrinal, with no orthodoxy, and no central text. It is amorphous and flexible, changing and adapting in different situations, and emphasising efficacy over dogma. It is open to ongoing revision, being eclectic and absorbing elements from many cultural backgrounds, including from other parts of Africa but also from Europe, Asia, and the Americas. West African religions commonly absorb elements from elsewhere regardless of their origin; in West Africa, many individuals draw upon African traditional religions, Christianity, and Islam simultaneously to deal with life's issues.

In West Africa, vodúnsɛntó sometimes abandon their religion for forms of Christianity such as Evangelical Protestantism, although there are also Christians who convert to Vodún. A common approach is for people to practice Christianity while also engaging in Vodún rituals, although there are also vodúnsɛntó who reject Christianity, deeming it incompatible with their tradition.

== Beliefs ==
In Vodún, belief is centred around efficacy rather than Christian notions of faith.

=== Theology ===
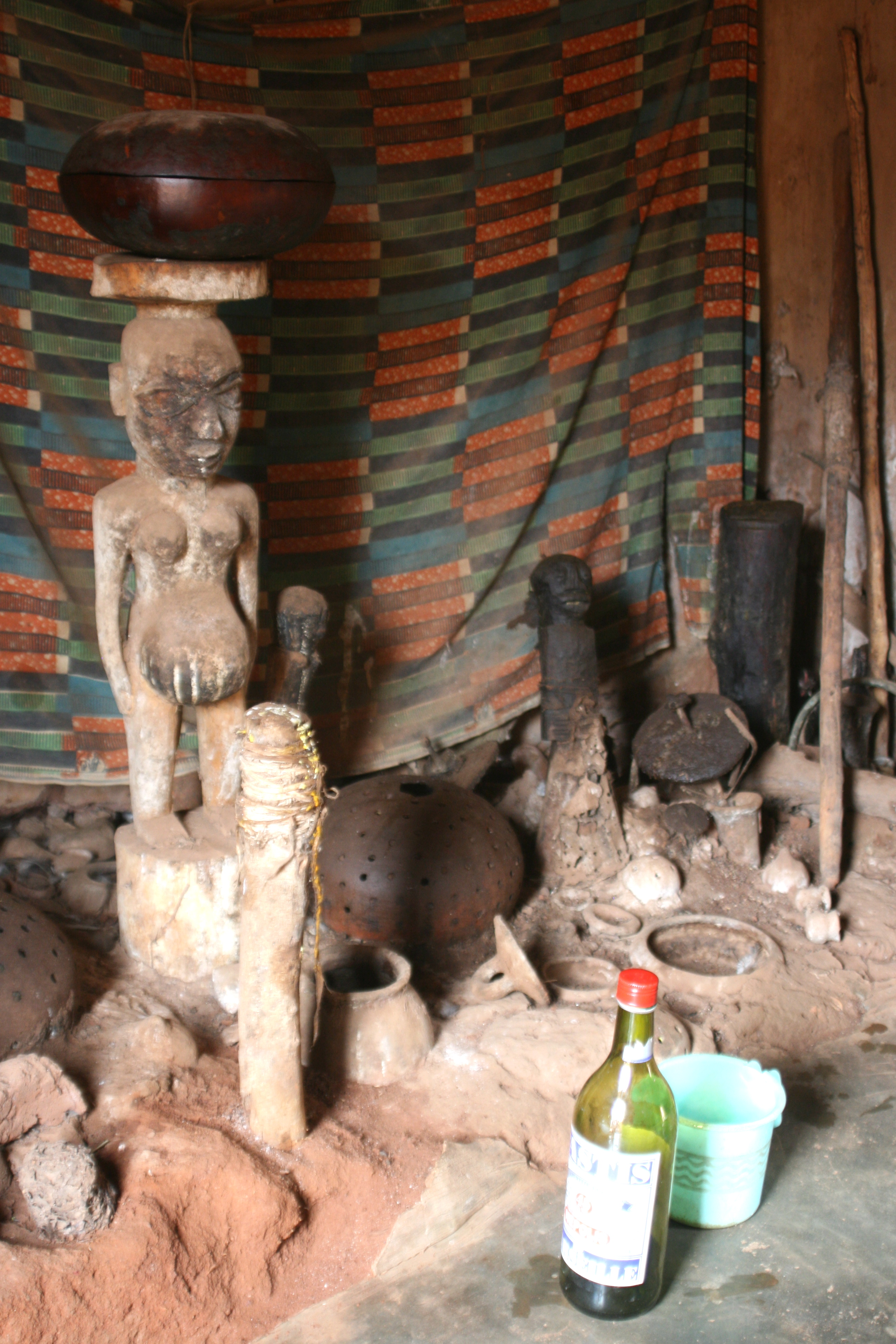
A Vodun altar in Abomey, Benin in 2008

Vodún teaches the existence of a single divine creator being. Below this entity are an uncountable number of spirits who govern different aspects of nature and society. Some are associated with particular cities, others with specific families. The term vodún comes from the Gbé languages of the Niger-Congo language family. It translates as "spirit", "God", "divinity", or "presence". Among Fon-speaking Yoruba communities, the Fon term vodún is regarded as being synonymous with the Yoruba language term òrìs̩à. Some Beninese acknowledge that certain Yoruba orisa are more powerful than certain vodún.

The art historian Suzanne Preston Blier called these "mysterious forces or powers that govern the world and the lives of those who reside within it". The religion is continually open to the incorporation of new spirit deities, while those that are already venerated may change and take on new aspects. Some Vodún practitioners for instance refer to Jesus Christ as the vodún of the Christians. Since the mid-20th century, many Vodún practitioners have also adopted chromolithographs of Hindu deities or Sikh gurus and interpreted them as portrayals of particular vodún.

A common belief is that the vodún came originally from the sea, with the term "India" having come to be used synonymously with "the sea" among many practitioners. The spirits are thought to dwell in Kútmómɛ ("land of the dead"), an invisible world parallel to that of humanity. The vodún spirits have their own individual likes and dislikes; each also has particular songs, dances, and prayers directed to them. These spirits are deemed to manifest within the natural world. When kings introduced new deities to the Fon people, it was often believed that these enhanced the king's power.

The cult of each vodún has its own particular beliefs and practices. It may also have its own restrictions on membership, with some groups only willing to initiate family members. People may venerate multiple vodún sometimes also attending services at a Christian church.

==== Prominent vodún ====
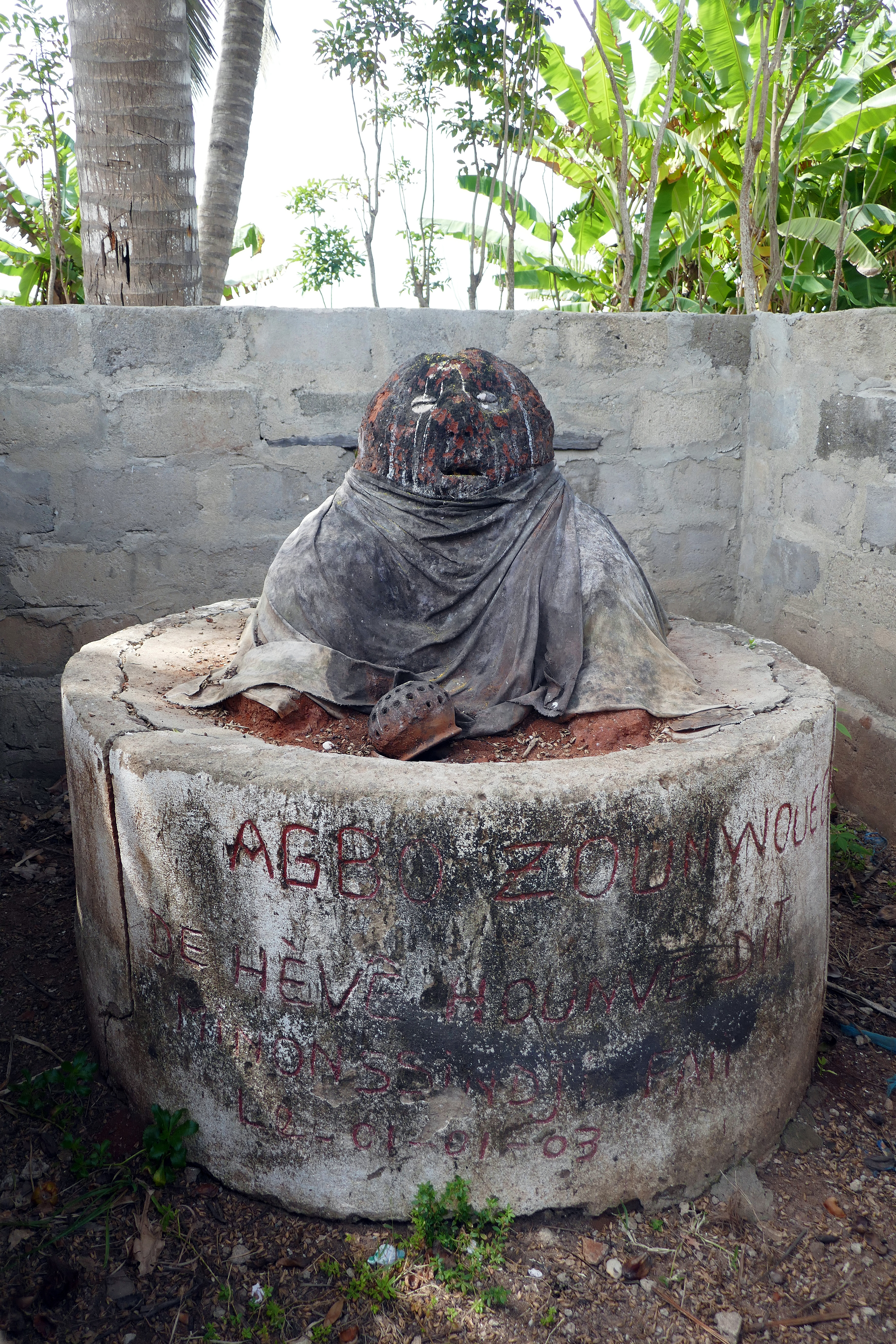
A shrine to Lɛgbà in Grand-Popo.

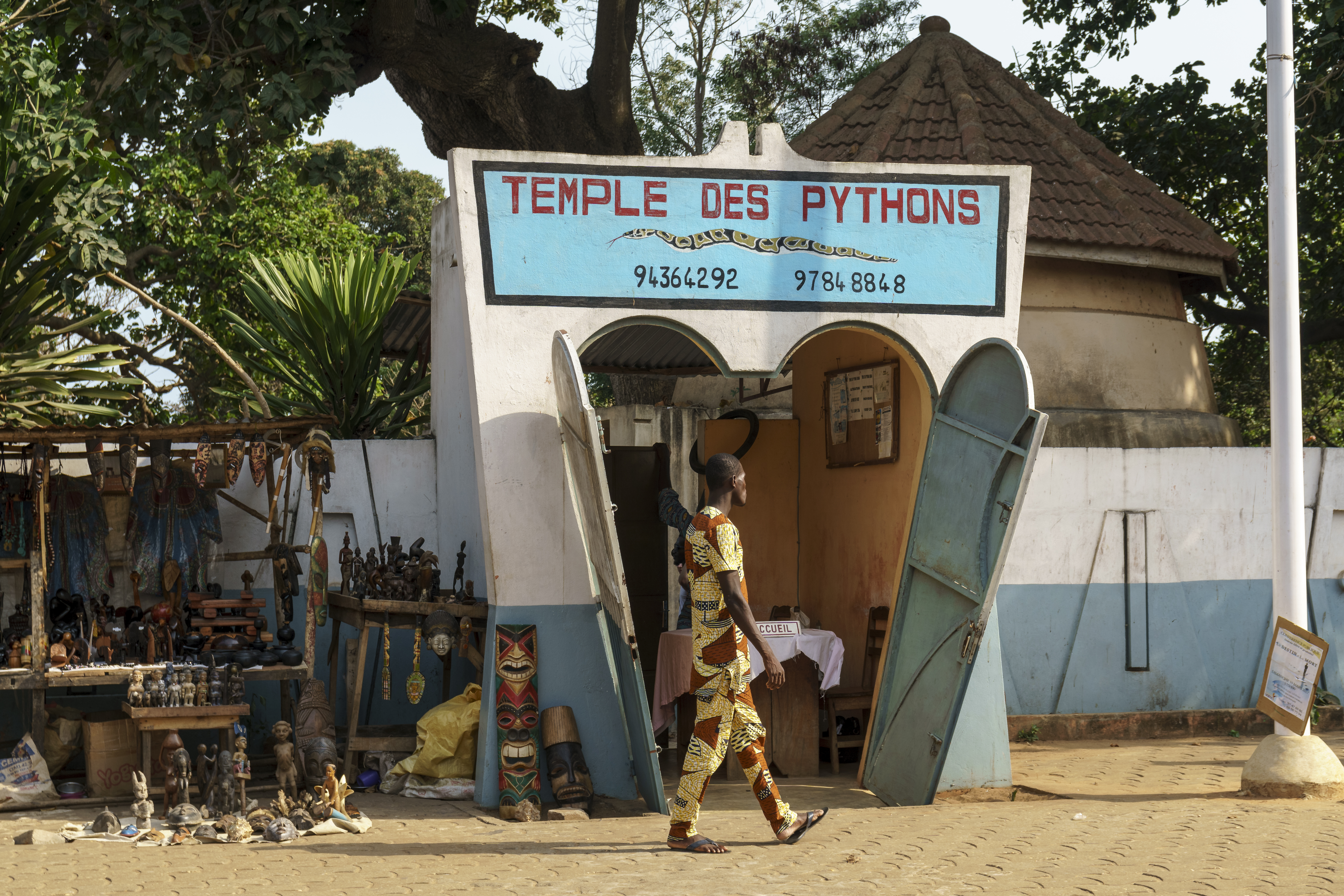
The Temple of the Pythons in Ouidah, centre of Dangbé's worship.

Opening up communication between humanity and the spirit world is the vodún of the crossroads, known in Fon as Lɛgbà, and in Ewe and Mina as Elegba. This figure may have been absorbed from the Yoruba, among whom he is called Eshu-Elegba. He is often the first spirit consulted for a new endeavour. Visually, he is characterised by his large erection.

The creator deity is Nana-Buluku. One of this being's offspring is Mawu-Lisa, an androgynous two-part deity also known as Mawu, Se, Segbo-Lisa, or Lissa. Lisa is the male side of this vodún who commands the sun and daytime, while Mawu is its female side, responsible for commanding the moon and the night. As Lisa is represented by the colour white, albinos are often regarded as his incarnation.

In one tradition, Mawu bore seven children. Sakpata: Vodun of the Earth, Xɛvioso (or Xɛbioso): Vodun of Thunder, also associated with divine justice, Agbe: Vodun of the Sea, Gû: Vodun of Iron and War, Agê: Vodun of Agriculture and Forests, Jo: Vodun of Air, and Lêgba: Vodun of the Unpredictable. In other stories, Mawu-Lisa is depicted as a single hermaphroditic person capable of impregnating herself, with two faces rather than being twins. In other branches, the Creator and other voduwo (vodu pl.) are known by different names, such as Sakpo-Disa (Mawu), Aholu (Sakpata), and Anidoho (Da), Gorovodu.

The Dàn spirits are all serpents; Dàn is a serpent vodún associated with riches and cool breezes. Sakpatá is the vodún of earth and smallpox, but over time has come to be associated with new diseases such as HIV/AIDS. Xɛbiosò or Hɛvioso is the spirit of thunder and lightning; he is represented by a fire-spitting ram and is particularly popular in Southern Benin. The vodún of metal, blacksmithing, technology, and war is known in Fon as Gŭ and in Mine and Ewe as Egu; in more recent decades he has come to be associated with metal vehicles such as cars, trains, and planes. Among the Ewe and Mina, he is Egu. Gbădu is the wife of Fá. Tohosu is the Fon vodún of royalty, lakes, streams, and human deformities.

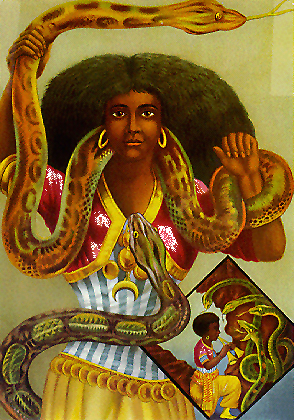
Chromolithograph of a snake charmer, inspired by the performer Maladamatjaute (Nala Damajanti). Printed in the 1880s by the Adolph Friedlander Company in Hamburg, the poster gave rise to a common image of Mami Wata.

Mami Wata or Mamiyata is a seductress, associated with the bringing of wealth. Along parts of coastal Benin and Togo, Mami Wata is regarded not as a singular spirit but as a larger pantheon of spirits. Mami Wata is widely portrayed in an image that derives from a late 19th-century chromolithograph of a snake charmer, probably Samoan, who worked in a German circus. Her husband is sometimes called Ako Ado and is associated with parakeets. Also linked to Mami Wata is Mami Dan, also known as Ekpon (the Mina word for panther), and who is deemed to clear the path for Mami Wata to proceed.

Certain vodún have been transmitted from northern communities in recent centuries. One example is Tron, the vodún of the kola nut. He was introduced to the Vodún pantheon via Ewe speakers from Ghana and Togo, and is often claimed to have originated in a city called Acrachi in northern Ghana, which is potentially Ketekrachi. Another is Attingali, who originated in northern Ghana but whose veneration was reported in Parakov, Benin, by 1947. His cult is now concentrated around Abomey-Calavi.

Also part of the Vodún worldview is the azizǎ, a type of forest spirit.

Prayers to the vodún usually include requests for financial wealth. Practitioners seek to gain well-being by focusing on the health and remembrance of their families. There may be restrictions on who can venerate the deity; practitioners believe that women must be kept apart from Gbădu's presence, for if they get near her they may be struck barren or die. Devotion to a particular deity may be marked in different ways; devotees of the smallpox spirit Sakpatá for instance scar their bodies to resemble smallpox scars.

==== Ancestral vodún ====
Ancestor veneration is important for Fon and Mina peoples. Some Vodún traditions specifically venerate spirits of deceased humans. The Tchamba tradition takes its name from an ethnic group and region in northern Togo. It honours the spirits of slaves from this region who are believed to have become ancestors of contemporary Ewe people. Female spirits in this complex are often called Maman Tchamba, and are believed to be married to male Tchamba spirits. Similarly, the Gorovodu tradition also venerates enslaved northerners, who are described as being from the Hausa, Kaybe, Mossi, and Tchamba ethnicities.

When a person is possessed by a Tchamba spirit, they may draw lines on their face with kaolin, symbolising the scarification markings of northern people.

=== The soul ===
Among the Fon, a common belief is that the head is the seat of a person's soul. The head is thus of symbolic importance in Vodún.

=== Acɛ ===
An important concept in Vodún is acɛ, a notion also shared by Yoruba religion and various African diasporic religions influenced by them. Landry defined acɛ as "divine power". It is the acɛ of an object that is deemed to provide it with its power and efficacy.

== Practice ==
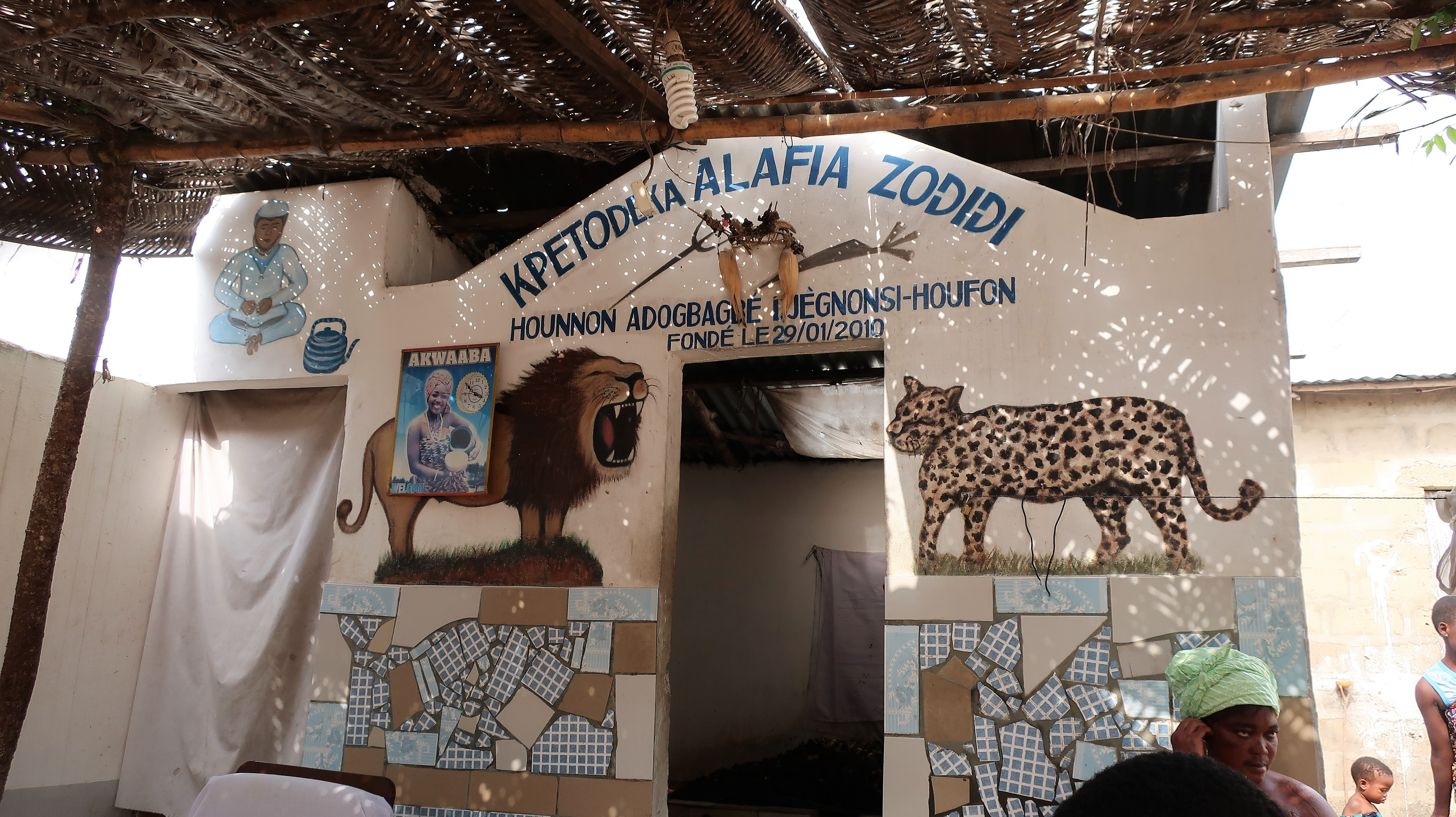
A Vodun temple in Grand-Popo, Benin, in 2018

The anthropologist Dana Rush noted that Vodun "permeates virtually all aspects of life for its participants". As a tradition, it prioritises action and getting things done. Rosenthal found that, among members of the Gorovodu tradition, people stated that they followed the religion because it helped to heal their children when the latter fell sick. Financial transactions play an important role, with both the vodún and their priests typically expecting payment for their services.

Landry described the religion as being "deeply esoteric". A male priest may be referred to with the Fon word hùngán. The priesthoods of particular spirits may bear specific names; the priestesses of Mama Wata are for instance called Mamisi. These practitioners may advertise their ritual services using radio, television, billboard adverts, and the internet. There are individuals who claim the title of the "supreme child of Vodún in Benin", however there are competing claimants to the title and it is little recognised outside Ouidah.

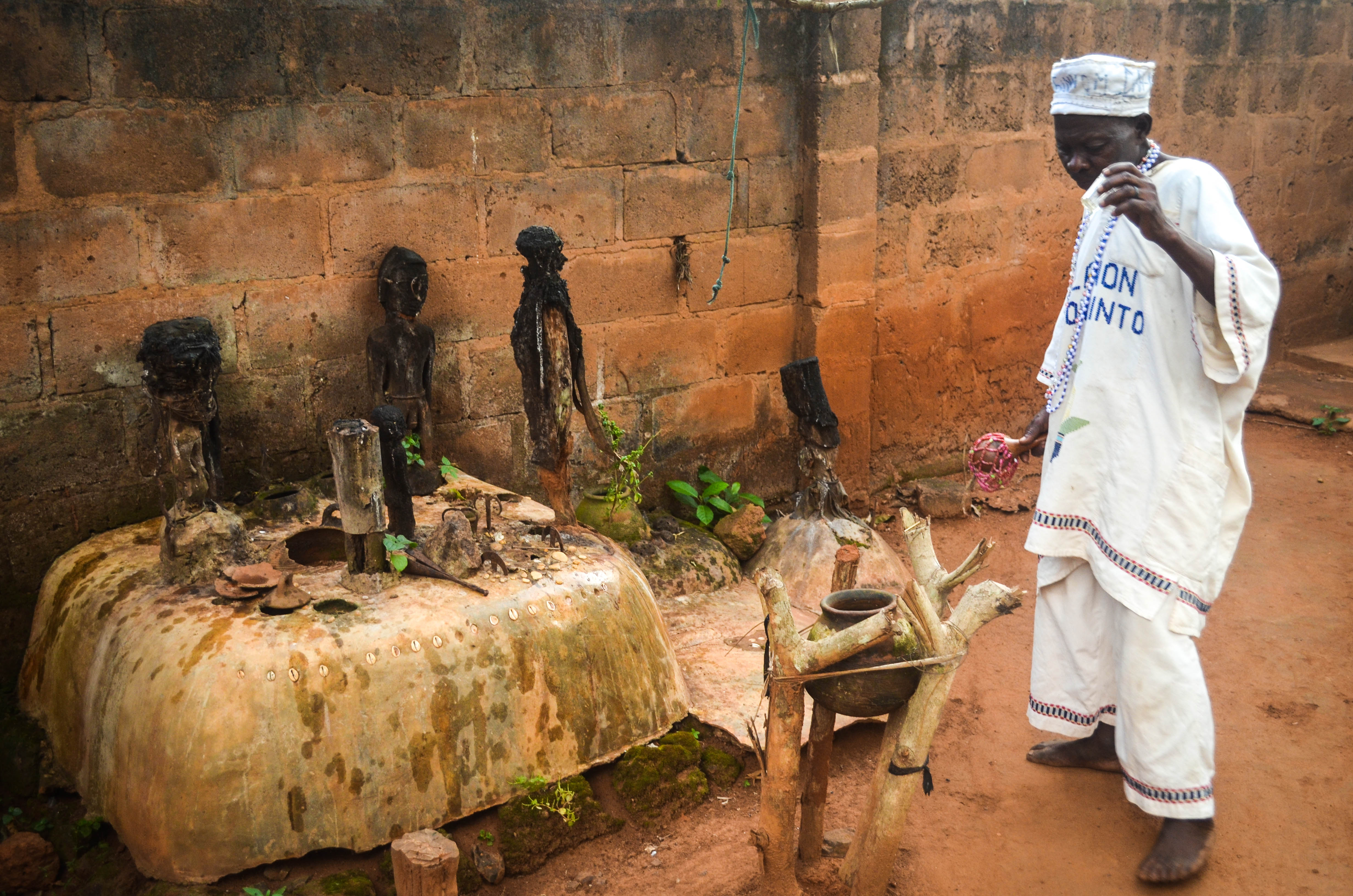
A priest in Abomey caring for a shrine

The forest is a major symbol in Vodún. Vodun practitioners believe that many natural materials contain supernatural powers, including leaves, meteorites, kaolin, soil from the crossroads, the feathers of African grey parrots, turtle shells, and dried chameleons. Landry stated that a connection to the natural environment was "a dominant theme" in the religion. The forest in particular is important in Vodun cosmology, and learning the power of the forest and of particular leaves that can be found there is a recurring theme among practitioners. Leaves, according to Landry, are "building blocks for the spirits' power and material presence on earth". Leaves will often be immersed in water to create vodùnsin (vodun water), which is used to wash both new shrines and new initiates.

Certain vodún cults display clear Christian or Islamic influences. Initiates of the Attingali cult for instance celebrate Islamic holidays, while that of Tron involves observing fasting during both Ramadan and Lent. The Tron cult also incorporates a Vodún mass held on Sundays, which is an adoption of a Vodún ceremony in the form of a Catholic mass, while typically marking out ritual paraphernalia with the Islamic star and crescent moon symbol.

=== Initiation ===
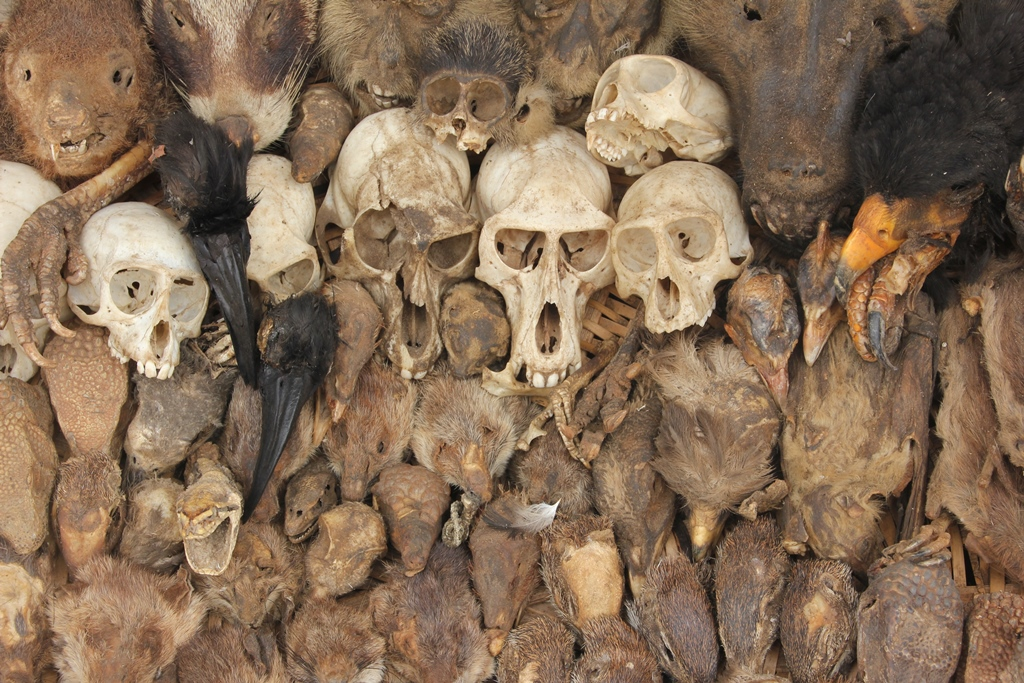
Animal heads and other body parts, sold for ritual uses, at the Akodessawa Market in Lomé, Togo in 2015

Initiation bestows a person with the power of a vodún. It results in long-term obligations to the spirits that a person has received; that person is expected to honour their spirits with praise, to feed them, and to supply them with money, while in turn the spirit offers benefits to the initiate, giving them promises of protection, abundance, long life, and a large family. The Fon term yawotcha, which potentially derives from Yoruba, refers to an initiation in which the initiate marries their vodún.

The typical age of a person being initiated varies between spirit cults; in some cases children are preferred. The process of initiation can last from a few months to a few years. It differs among spirit cults; in Benin, Fá initiation usually takes less than a week, whereas initiations into the cults of other vodún may take several weeks or months. Initiation is expensive; especially high sums are generally charged for foreigners seeking initiation or training. Practitioners believe that some spirits embody powers that are too intense for non-initiates. Being initiated is described as "to find the spirit's depths". Animal sacrifice is a typical feature of initiation. Trainees will often be expected to learn many different types of leaves and respective qualities.

Initiation into the tradition of a particular vodún often entails certain commitments. Initiates of the Tron and Attingali traditions, for instance, are forbidden from eating pork, an idea probably adopted from Islam. Worshippers of the Tchamba spirits will often wear a tchambagan ("metal of Tchamba"), a metal bracelet consisting of black, white, and red elements.

=== Shrines ===
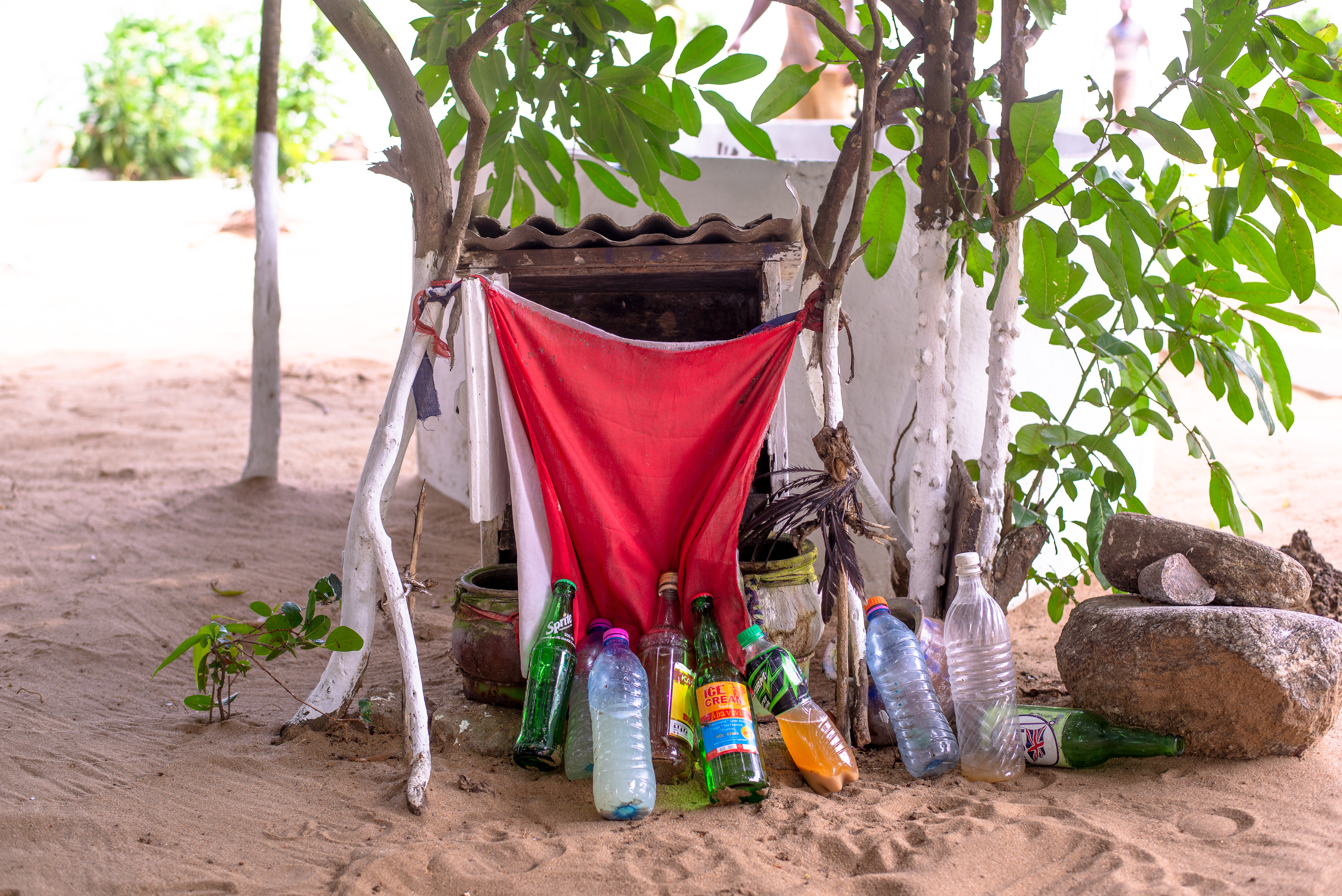
A Vodun shrine in Tegbi, in the Volta region of Ghana, in 2021

The spirit temple is often referred to as the vodúnxɔ or the hunxɔ. This may be located inside a practitioner's home, in a publicly accessible communal area, or hidden in a part of the forest accessible only to initiates. Its location impacts who uses it; some are used only by a household, others by a village, and certain shrines attract international pilgrims.

For adherents, shrines are deemed to be physical incarnations of the spirits, not simply images or representations of them. Rosenthal called these shrines "god-objects". A wooden carved statue is referred to as a bòcyɔ.

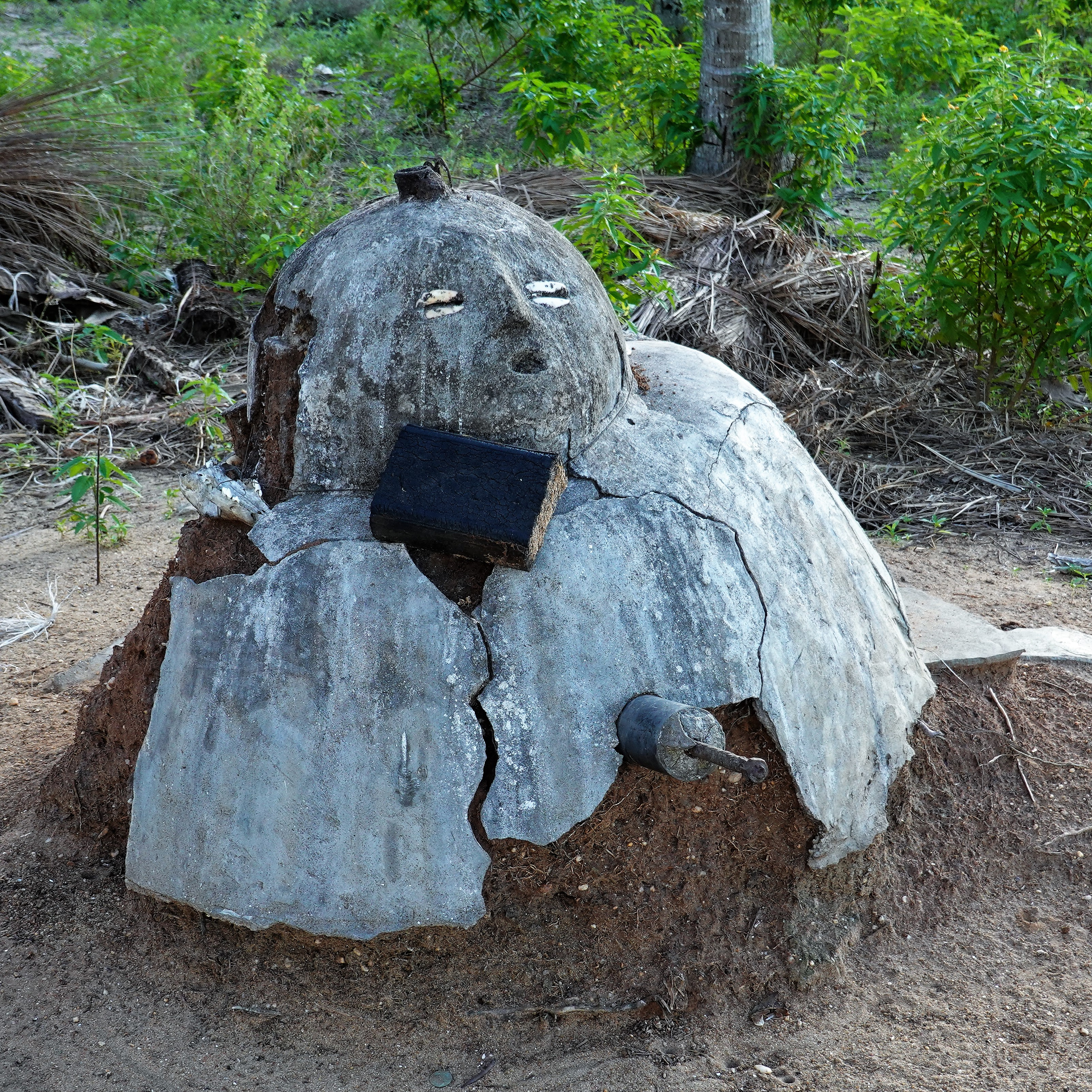
A shrine to Lɛgbà, who is typically represented by mounds of soil

Particular objects are selected for use in building a shrine based on intrinsic qualities they are believed to possess. The constituent parts of the shrine are dependent on the identity of the spirit being enshrined there. Fá for instance is enshrined in 16 palm nuts, while Xɛbiosò's shrines require sò kpɛn ("thunderstones') believed to have been created where lightning struck the earth. Tron's worship requires the presence of seven kola nuts. Gbǎdù, as the "mother of creation," often requires that her shrines incorporate a vagina, either of a deceased family matriarch or of an animal, along with camwood, charcoal, kaolin, and mud.

Shrines to the Tchamba spirits will typically include cowry shells, as these were used as the currency to buy the Tchamba when they were enslaved people. Tchamba shrines will commonly also have a cement grinding stone, representing the slaves' task of grinding corn.

Lɛgbà, meanwhile, is represented by mounds of soil, typically covering leaves and other objects buried within it. There may also be some experimentation in the ingredients used in constructing the shrine, as practitioners hope to make the manifested spirit as efficacious as possible.

==== Creating and maintaining shrines ====
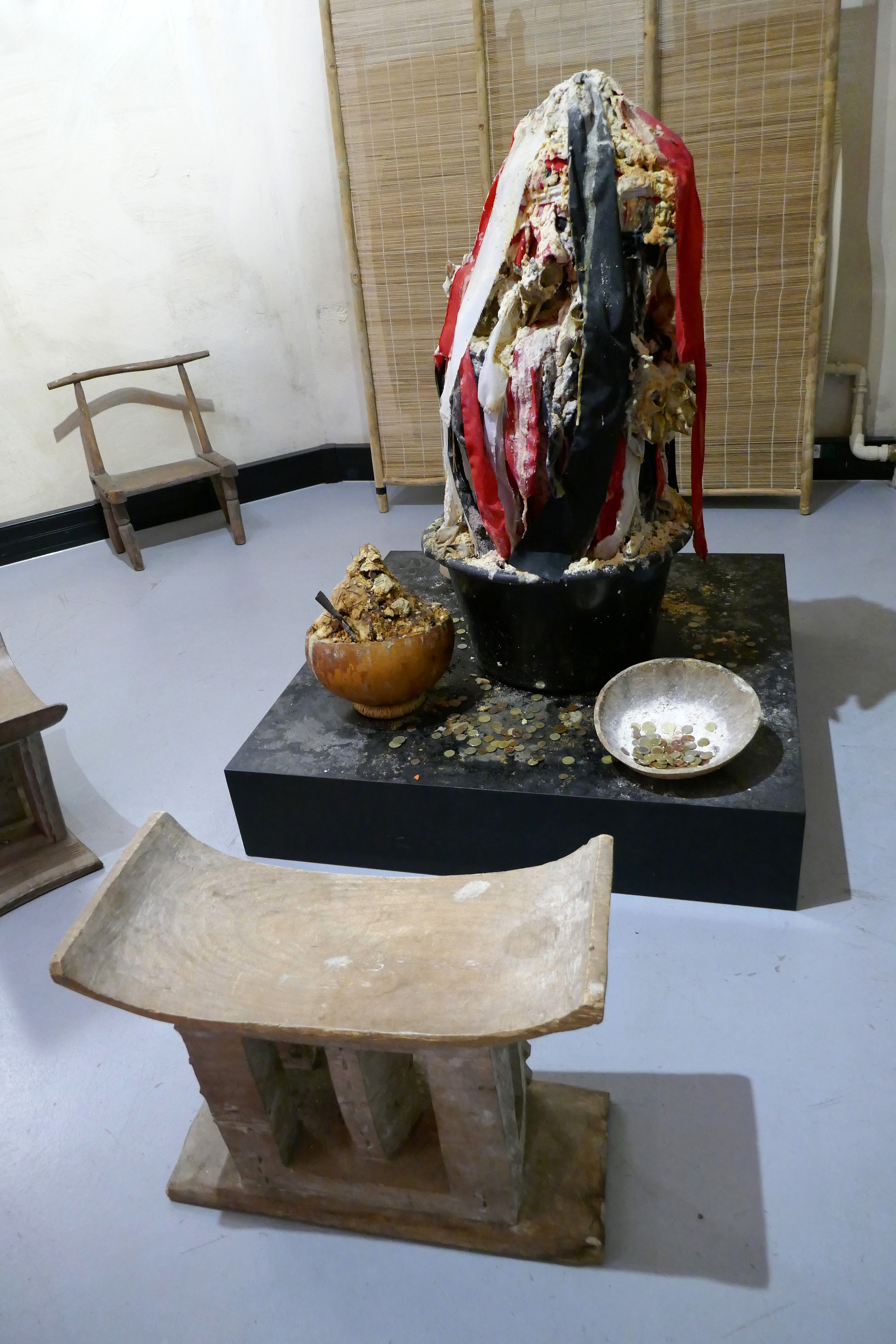
An example of a Vodún shrine on display at a museum in Strasbourg

Plant material is often used in building shrines, with specific leaves being important in the process. Offerings may be given to a tree from which material is harvested. Shrines may also include material from endangered species, including leopard hides, bird eggs, parrot feathers, insects, and elephant ivory. Various foreign initiates, while trying to leave West Africa, have found material intended for their shrines confiscated at airport customs.

In a ritual that typically incorporates divination, sacrifices, and leaf baths for both the objects and the practitioner, the spirit is installed within these shrines. It is the objects added, and the rituals performed while adding them, that are deemed to give the spirit its earthly power.

An animal will usually be sacrificed to ensure the spirit manifests within the shrine; it is believed that the animal charges the spirit's acɛ, which gives the shrine life. For shrines to Lɛgbà, for instance, a rooster force-fed red palm oil will often be buried alive at the spot where the shrine is to be built. When praying at a shrine, it is customary for a worshipper to leave a gift of money for the spirits. There are often also pots around it in which offerings may be placed. Wooden stakes may be impaled into the floor around the shrine as part of an individual's petition.

In this material form, the spirits must be maintained, fed, and cared for. Offerings and prayers will be directed towards the shrine as a means of revitalising its power. At many shrines, years of dried blood and palm oil have left a patina across the shrine and offering vessels. Some have been maintained for hundreds of years. Shrines may also be adorned and embellished with new objects gifted by devotees. Shrines of Yalódè for instance may be adorned in brass bracelets, and those of Xɛbiosoò with carved wooden axes. Although these objects are not seen as part of the spirit's material body itself, they are thought to carry the deity's divine essence.

=== Possession ===
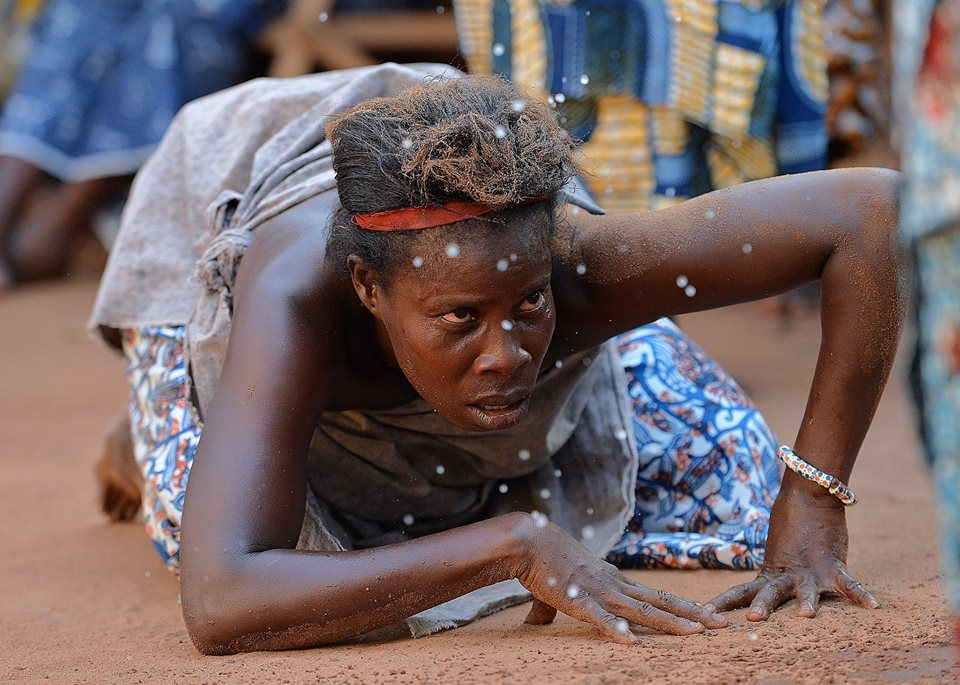
A Vodún practitioner in a possession trance, photographed in Benin in 2017

Possession is part of most Vodún cults. Rosenthal noted, from her ethnographic research in Togo, that females were more often possessed than males. Her research also found children as young as 10 being possessed, although most were over 15. In some vodún groups, priests will rarely go into possession trance as they are responsible for overseeing the broader ceremony.

The possessed person is often referred to as the vodún itself. Once the person has received the spirit, they will often be dressed in attire suitable for that possessing entity. The possessed will address other attendees, offering them advice on illnesses, conduct, and making promises. When a person is possessed, they may be cared for by another individual. Those possessed often enjoy the prestige of having hosted their deities.

=== Offerings and animal sacrifice ===
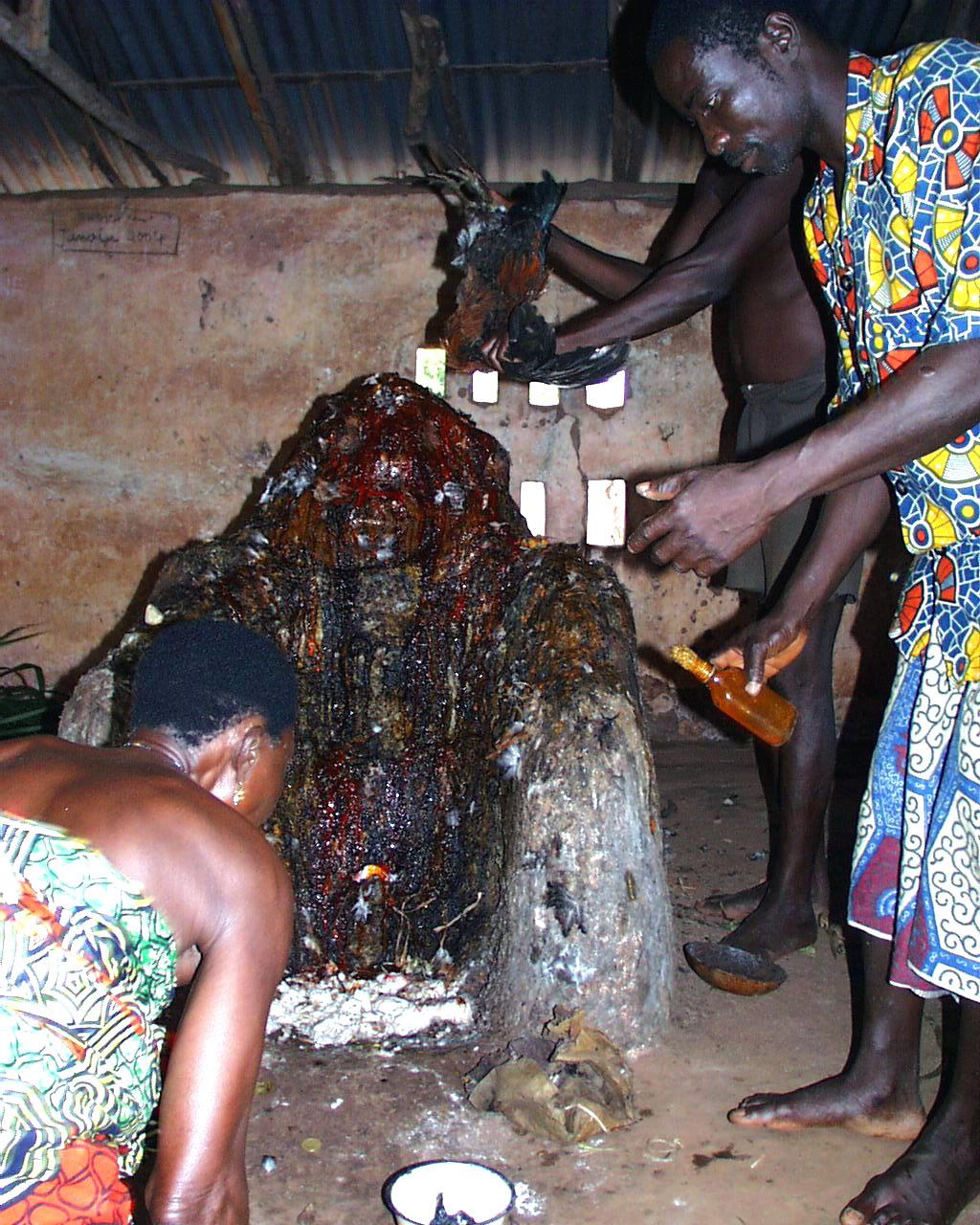
An animal sacrifice at a shrine in Abomey, Benin in 2004

The Tchamba spirits, who are associated with the north, are deemed to favour northern foods such as kola nuts and the millet-based drinks tchukutu and tchapkalo.

Vodun involves animal sacrifices to both ancestors and other spirits, a practice called vɔ in Fon. Animal species commonly used for sacrifice include birds, dogs, cats, goats, rams, and bulls. There is ample evidence that in parts of West Africa, human sacrifice was also performed prior to European colonisation, such as in the Dahomey kingdom during the Annual Customs of Dahomey.

Typically, a message to the spirits will be spoken into the animal's ear and its throat will then be cut. The shrine itself will be covered in the victim's blood. This is done to feed the spirit by nourishing its acɛ. Practitioners believe that this act maintains the relationship between humans and the spirits. The meat will be cooked and consumed by the attendees, something believed to bestow blessing from the vodún for the person eating it. The individual who killed the animal will often take ritual precautions to pacify their victim and discourage their spirit from taking vengeance upon them.

Among followers in the United States, where butchery skills are far rarer, it is less common for practitioners to eat the meat. Also present in the U.S. are practitioners who have rejected the role of animal sacrifice in Vodun, deeming it barbaric.

=== Divination ===
Divination plays an important role in Vodún. Different vodún groups often utilise different divinatory methods; the priestesses of Mamíwátá for instance employ mirror gazing, while the priests of Tron use kola nut divination. Among the Fon, divination trays are most often quadrangular in shape.

In Vodun, a diviner is called a bokónó. A successful diviner is expected to provide solutions to their client's problem, for instance selling them charms, spiritual baths, or ceremonies to alleviate their issue. The fee charged will often vary depending on the client, with the diviner charging a reduced rate for family members and a more expensive rate to either tourists or to middle and upper-class Beninese. Diviners will often recommend that their client seeks initiation.

Across Vodún's practitioners, Fá is often deemed the best form of divination. Fá is the Fon term; among the Ewe and Mina languages it is called Afa. The practice arose from the Yoruba people, and both the Fon and Ewe/Mina terms derive from the Yoruba word for this divinatory practice, Ifá. Ifá is generally acknowledged as having arisen at Ile-Ife in Yorubaland but its practice has spread throughout what is now lower Nigeria and across coastal Benin, Togo, and into Ghana. Fá/Afa involves casting either 16 palm nuts or a divining chain made of 8 half-seed shells, each bearing four sides. The way that these fall can produce one of 256 possible combinations, and each of these is associated with a verse called an odu that the diviner is expected to know and be able to interpret. Fá\Afa's initiates claim that it is the only system that has sufficient acɛ to be consistently accurate. Fá diviners typically believe that the priests of other spirits do not have the right to read the sacred signs of Fá. A consultation with an initiate is termed a fákínan.

=== Oró and Egúngún ===
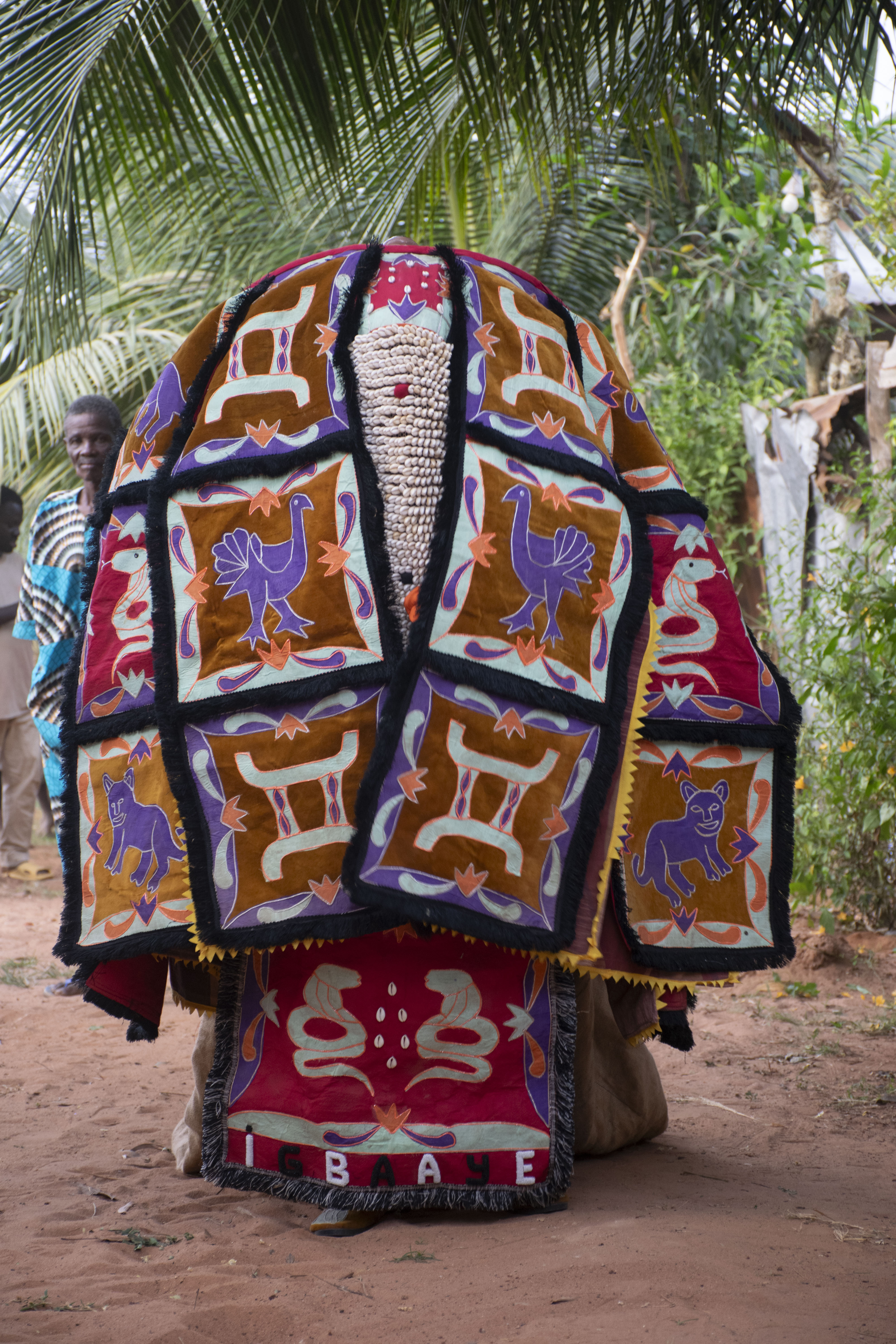
An Egúngún dancer in Ouidah, photographed in 2024

The Oró and Egúngún groups are all-male secret societies. In Beninese society, these groups command respect through fear. In contemporary Benin, it is common for a young man to be initiated into both societies on the same day.

According to lore, Egúngún originated among Yoruba people in Oyo but spread westward, now being found throughout Southern Benin and Togo and into Ghana. Various stories are told about how Egúngún was brought to Ouidah, for example; in one tale, an enslaved Yoruba man manifested his ancestors as Egúngún, and in another a Yoruba man rode into the city on a white horse, followed by his ancestors. Among Fon speakers, the Egúngún are referred to as Kulito ("the one from the path of death"), a term designating an ancestor. The Fon typically divide these ancestral spirits into two classifications: the agbanon ("the one with the load"), who are aggressive and engage in spinning and chasing, and the weduto ("the one who dances"), who are non-aggressive and who dance with more poise.

A culture of secrecy surrounds the Egúngún society. Once initiated, a man will be expected to have his own Egúngún mask made; these masks are viewed as embodiments of the ancestors. Some people also make these masks, but do not consecrate or use them, for sale on the international art market, but other members of the society disapprove of this practice. When the Egúngún are dancing, they evoke fear and respect; a common belief is that if the dancer's costume touches an onlooker then the latter will die.

=== Healing and bǒ ===
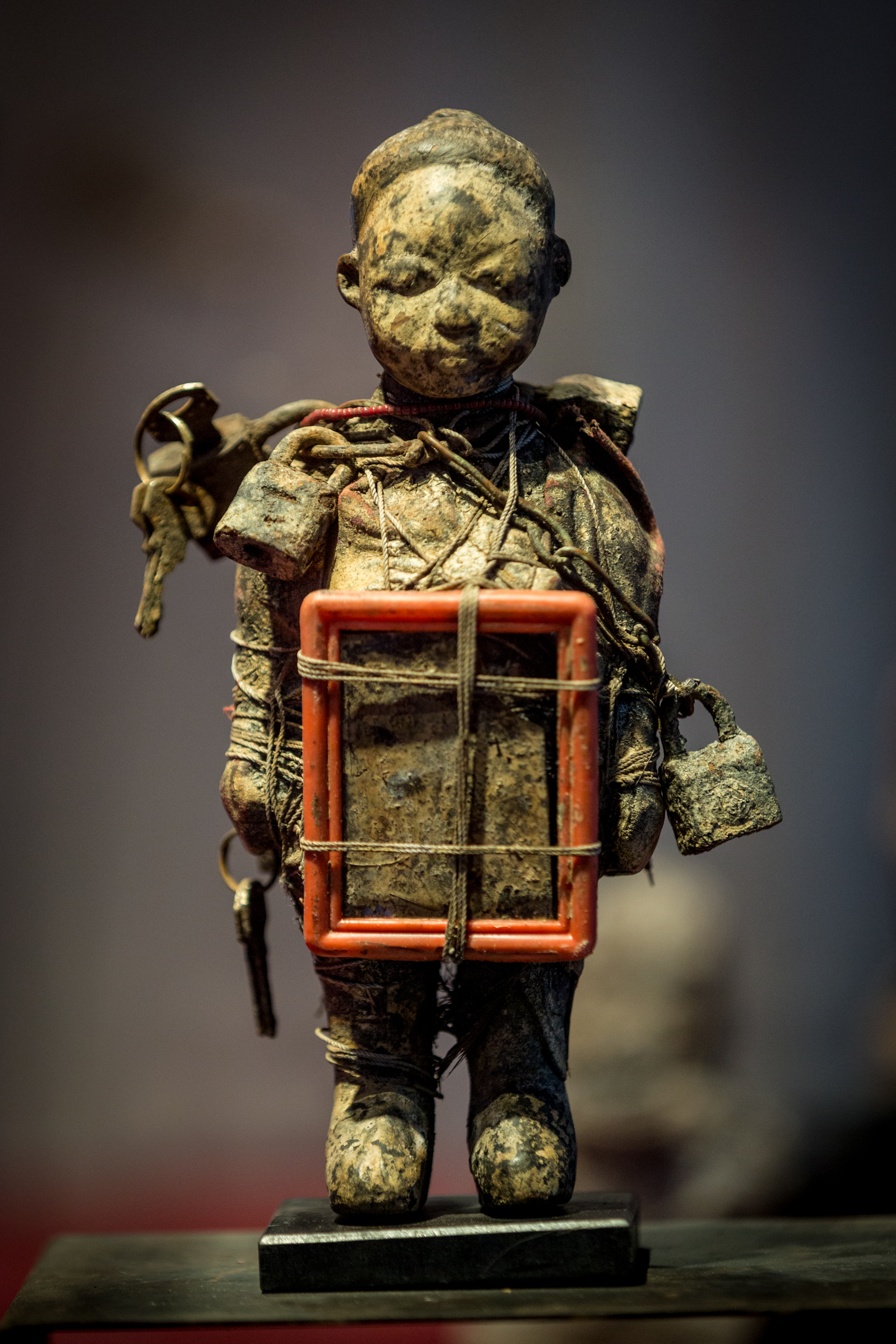
A Ewe bǒciɔ made in the latter half of the 20th century, on display in Strasbourg.

Healing is a central element of Vodún.

The Fon term bǒ can be translated into English as "charm"; many Francophone Beninese refer to them as gris gris. These are amulets made from zoological and botanical material that is then activated using secret incantations, the latter called bǒgbé ("bǒ's language"). Families or individuals often keep their recipes for creating bǒ a closely guarded secret; there is a widespread belief that if someone else discovers the precise ingredients they will have power over its maker. Bǒ are often sold; tourists for instance often buy them to aid in attracting love, wealth, or protection while travelling.

Bǒ designed for specific functions may have particular names; a zǐn bǒ is alleged to offer invisibility while a fifó bǒ provides the power of translocation. Anthropomorphic figurines produced especially in the Fon and Ayizo area of southern Benin are commonly called bǒciɔ ("bǒ cadaver"). These bǒciɔ are often kept within a shrine or house—sometimes concealed in the rafters or under a bed—although in some places have also been situated outside, in public spaces. Although bǒciɔ are not intended as representations of vodún, early European travellers who encountered these objects labelled them "idols" and "fetishes".

=== Azě ===
Another belief in Vodún is in azě a universal and invisible power, and one which many practitioners regard as the most powerful spiritual force available. In English, azě has sometimes been translated as "witchcraft". Several vodún such as Kɛnnɛsi, Mǐnɔna, and Gbădu, are thought to draw their power from azě. Many practitioners draw a distinction between azě wiwi, the destructive and harmful side of this power, and azě wèwé, its protective and benevolent side. People who claim to use this power call themselves azětɔ and typically insist that they employ azě wèwé to protect their families from azě wiwi. In Vodún lore, becoming an azětɔ comes at a cost, for the azě gives the practitioner a propensity for illness and shortens their life.

According to Vodún belief, azěto wiwi are capable of transforming into animals and flying. To become an azěto wiwi, an individual must use azě to kill someone, commonly a relative. In the tradition, practitioners of azě wiwi send their soul out at night, where they gather with other practitioners to plot how they will devour other people's souls, ultimately killing them. Owls, black cats, and vultures are all regarded as dangerous agents of azě. Many people fear that their success will attract the envy of malevolent azětɔ within their family or neighbourhood. The identity of the azěto wiwi, many practitioners believe, can be ascertained through divination. Landry found that everyone he encountered in Benin believed in azě to various degrees, whereas many non-Africans arriving for initiation were more sceptical of its existence.

The vodún Tron has a particular reputation for combatting witchcraft.

== History ==
=== Pre-colonial history ===
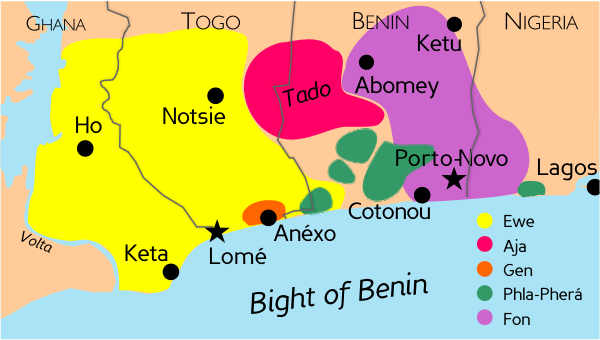
Area of Vodún practice encompassing Ewe and Fon populations

Landry noted that prior to European colonialism, Vodún was not identified as "a monolithic religion" but was "a social system made of countless spirit and ancestor cults that existed without religious boundaries." Many of these cults were closely interwoven with political structures, sometimes representing something akin to state religions.

From the early 16th century, waves of Adja and related peoples migrated eastward, establishing close ties with each other and forming the basis for the emergent Fon people. The Fon made contact with Portuguese sailors in the 16th century and subsequently also the French, British, Dutch, and Danish in the 17th and 18th centuries. The first document to reveal European interest in Vodun was the Doctrina Christiana from 1658.

The 17th century saw the rise of the Dahomey state in this area of West Africa. This generated religious change; early in the 17th century, Dahomey's king Agaja conquered the Xwedá kingdom (in what is now southern Benin) and the Xwedá's serpent vodún came to be widely adopted by the Fon. From c. 1727 to 1823, Dahomey was a vassal state of Oyo, the Yoruba-led kingdom to the east, with this period seeing considerable religious exchange between the two. Fon peoples adopted the Fá, Oró, and Egúngún cults from the Yoruba. Fá was for instance present among the Fon by the reign of Dahomey's fifth ruler, Tegbesu (r. 1732–1774) and by the reign of Gezo (r. 1818–1858) had become well established in the Dahomean royal palace. It was then under Gezo's role that, according to tradition, the Egúngún was formally recognised in Dahomey.

As a result of the Atlantic slave trade, Ouidah became a major slave embarkation point from the 1670s through to 1860s. Practitioners of Vodún were among those enslaved and transported to the Americas, where their practices influenced those of developing African diasporic traditions. Coupled with the religion of the Kongo people from Central Africa, the Vodún religion of the Fon became one of the two main influences on Haitian Vodou. Like the name Vodou itself, many of the terms used in this creolised Haitian religion derive from the Fon language; including the names of many deities, which in Haiti are called lwa. In Brazil, the dominant African diasporic religion became Candomblé and this was divided into various traditions called nacoes ("nations"). Of these nacoes, the Jeje tradition uses terms borrowed from Ewe and Fon languages, for instance referring to its spirit deities as vodun.

=== Colonialism and Christianity ===
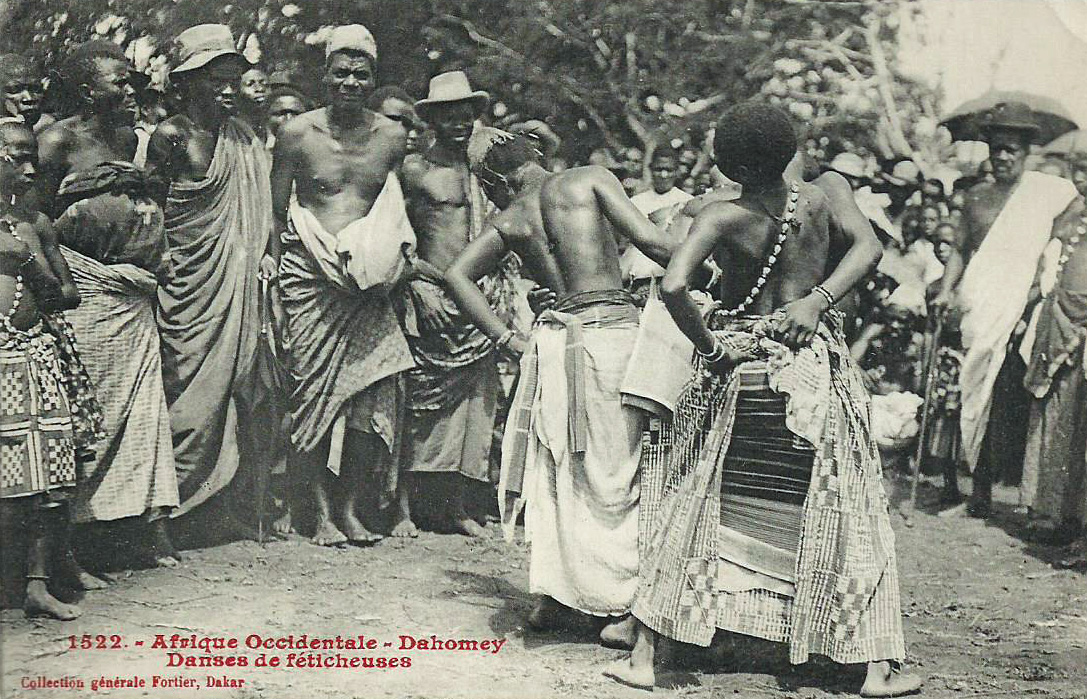
A ritual dance in Dahomey photographed in the 1920s

In 1890, France invaded Dahomey and dethroned its king, Béhanzin. In 1894, it became a French protectorate under a puppet king, Agoli-agbo, but in 1900 the French ousted him and abolished the Kingdom of Dahomey. To the west, the area that became Togo became a German protectorate in 1884. Germany maintained control until 1919 when, following their defeat in the First World War, the eastern portion became part of the British Gold Coast and the western part became French territory.

Christian missionaries were active in this part of West Africa from the 18th century. A German Presbyterian mission had established in the Gold Coast in 1737 before spreading their efforts into the Slave Coast in the 19th century. These Presbyterians attempted to break adherence to Vodún in the southern and plateau regions. The 19th century also saw conversion efforts launched by Roman Catholic, Anglican, and Methodist missionaries.

Although proving less of an influence than Christianity, Islam also impacted Vodún, reflected in the occasional use of Islamic script in the construction of Vodún charms. Around the time of the Second World War, Indian merchants began setting up firms along the West African coast, allowing Hindu elements (especially the use of chromolithographs) to filter into Vodún.

=== Post-colonial history ===
In 1960, Dahomey became an independent state, as did Togo. In 1972, Mathieu Kérékou seized power of Dahomey in a military coup and subsequently transformed it into a Marxist-Leninist state, the People's Republic of Benin. Kérékou believed that Vodún wasted time, money, and resources that were better spent on economic development. In 1973 he banned Vodún ceremonies during the rainy season, with further measures to suppress the religion following throughout the 1970s. Under Kérékou's rule, Vodun priests had to perform new initiations in secret, and the duration of the initiatory process was often shortened from a period of years to one of months, weeks, or days.

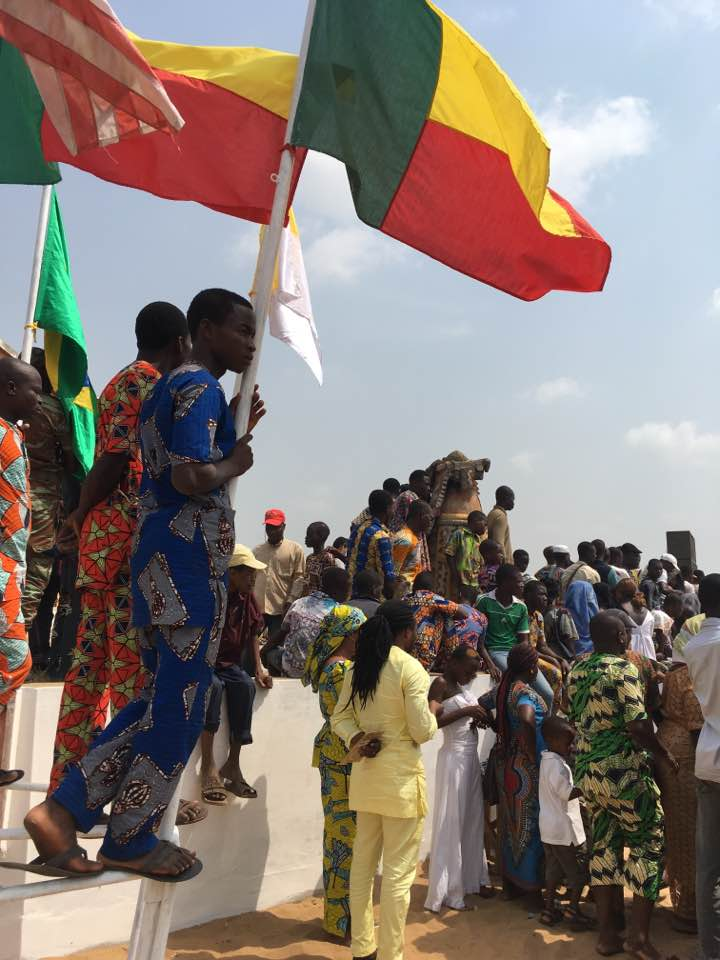
People celebrating National Vodún Day in Ouidah in 2017

In 1989, Benin transitioned to democratic governance. After becoming prime minister in 1991, Nicéphore Soglo lifted many anti-Vodún laws. The Beninese government planned "Ouidah '92: The First International Festival of Vodun Arts and Cultures," which took place in 1993; among the special guests invited were Pierre Verger and Mama Lola, reflecting attempts to build links across the African diaspora. Also in 1993, it established 10 January as annual "National Vodún Day." From the 1990s, the Beninese government increasingly made a concerted effort to encourage Vodún-themed tourism, hoping that many foreigners would come seeking initiation. The early 1990s also saw growing international interest in contemporary Beninese art, much of it influenced by Vodún.

By the late 1960s, some American black nationalists were travelling to West Africa to gain initiation into Vodún or Yoruba religion. By the late 1980s, some white middle-class Americans began arriving for the same reason. Some initiates of Haitian Vodou or Santería still go to West Africa for initiation as they believe that it is there that the "real secrets" or "true spiritual power" can be found; the majority of arrivals seek initiation into Fá. West Africans have also taken the religion to the U.S., where it has interacted and blended with diasporic religions such as Vodou and Santería. Many West African practitioners have seen the international promotion of Vodún as a means of healing the world and countering hate and violence, as well as a means of promoting their own ritual abilities to an international audience, which will potentially attract new clients.

== Demographics ==
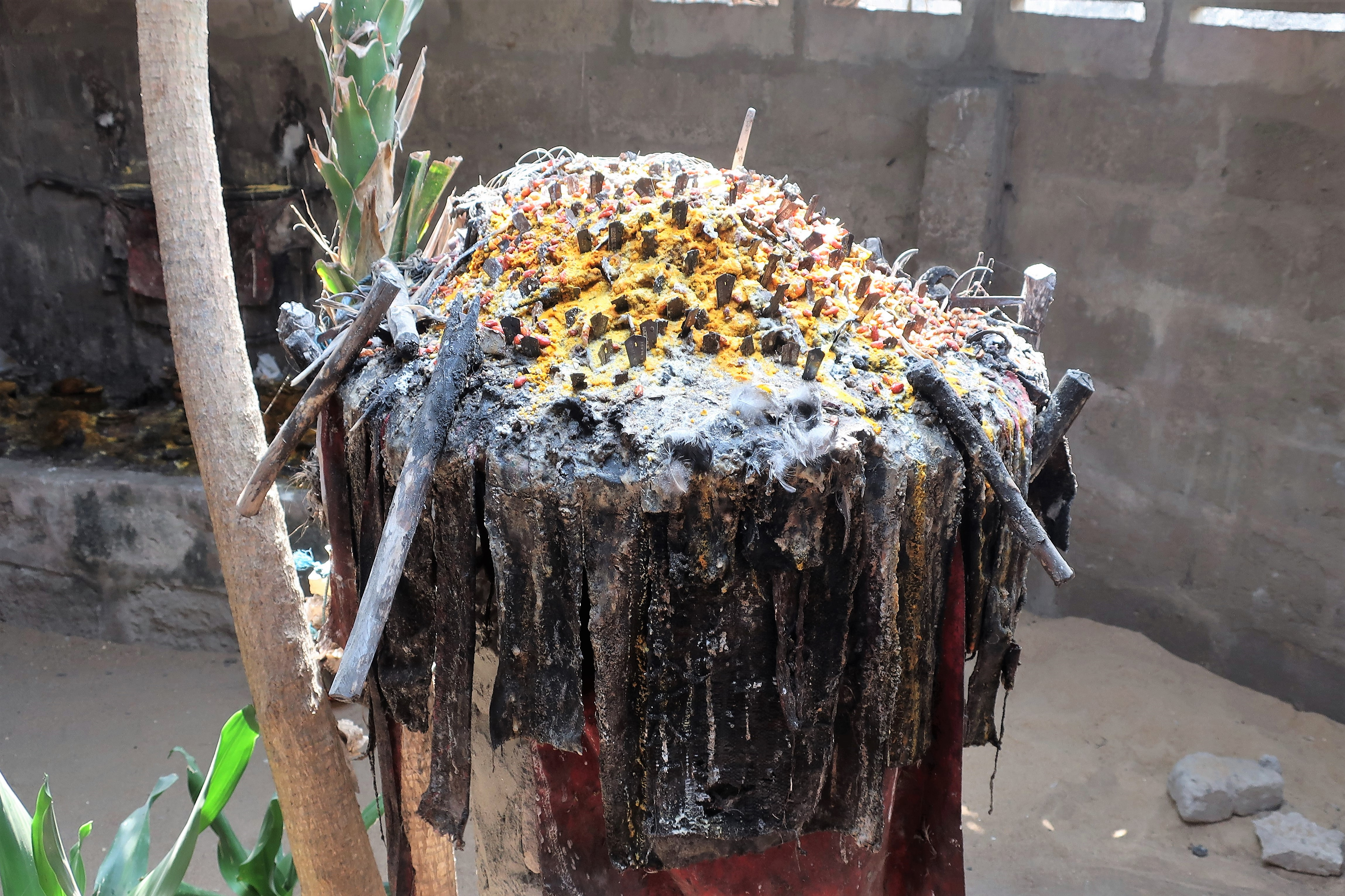
A Vodun altar in Grand-Popo, Benin photographed in 2018

About 17% of the population of Benin, some 1.6 million people, follow Vodun. (This does not count other traditional religions in Benin.) In addition, many of the 41.5% of the population that refer to themselves as "Christian" practice a syncretized religion, not dissimilar from Haitian Vodou or Brazilian Candomblé; indeed, many of them are descended from freed Brazilian slaves who settled on the coast near Ouidah.

In Togo, about half the population practices indigenous religions, of which Vodun is by far the largest, with some 2.5 million followers; there may be another million Vodunists among the Ewe of Ghana, as 13% of the total Ghana population of 20 million are Ewe and 38% of Ghanaians practice traditional religion. According to census data, about 14 million people practice traditional religion in Nigeria, most of whom are Yoruba practicing Ifá, but no specific breakdown is available.

Although initially present only among West Africans, Vodún is now followed by people of many races, ethnicities, nationalities, and classes. Foreigners who come for initiation are predominantly from the United States; many of them have already explored African diasporic traditions such as Haitian Vodou, Santería, or Candomblé, or alternatively Western esoteric religions such as Wicca. Many of the spiritual tourists who arrived in West Africa had little or no Fon or French, nor an understanding of the region's cultural and social norms. Some of these foreigners seek initiation so that they can initiate others as a source of revenue.

== Reception and influence ==
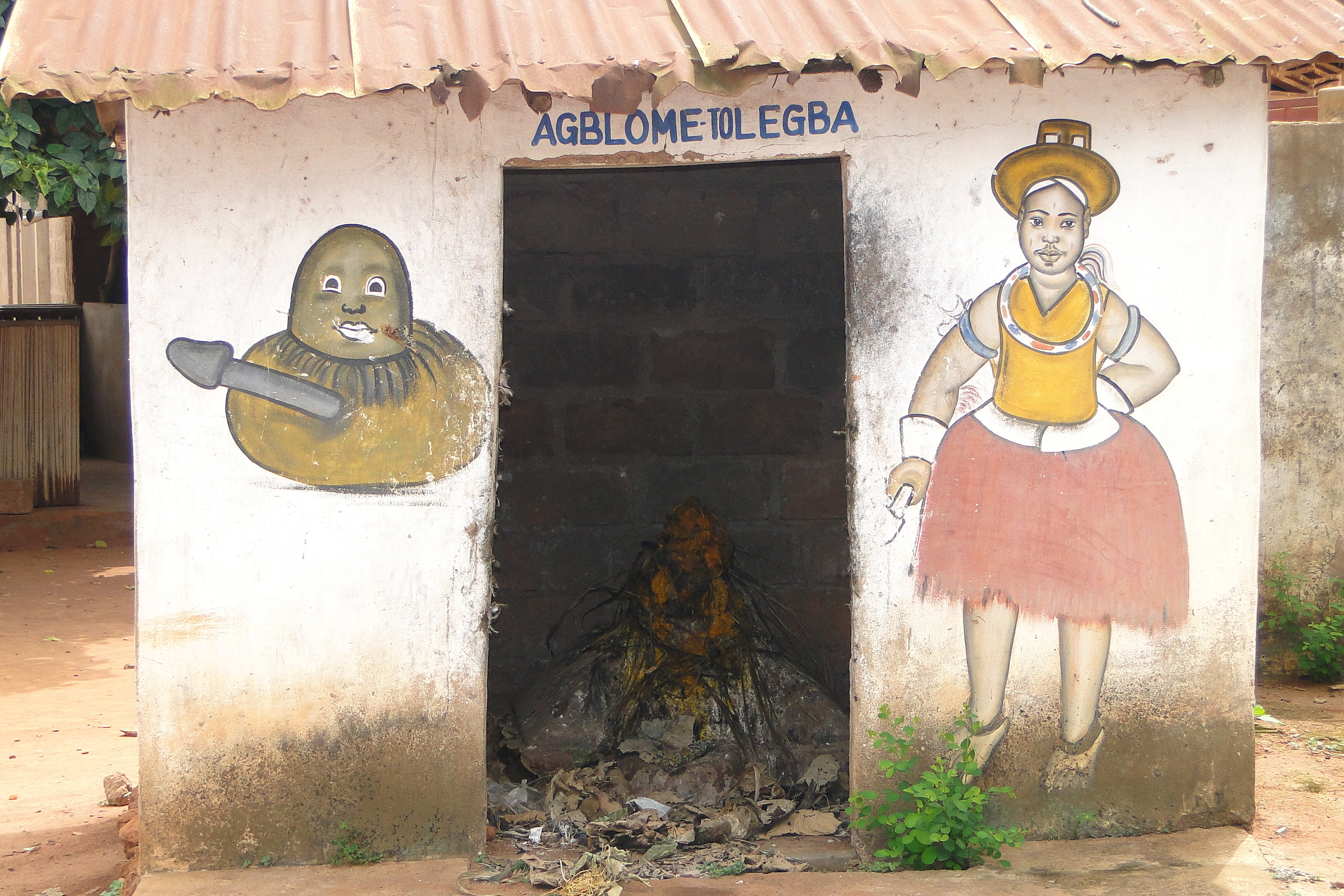
A shrine inside a small building in Abomey, Benin

In the view of some foreign observers, Vodún is considered a form of Satanism and demon worship. Although seeing its deities as malevolent demons, many West African Christians still regard Vodún as being effective and powerful. Some Beninese regard Christianity as "less worrisome and less expensive" than Vodún; many individuals converted to Christianity to deal with bewitchment, believing that Jesus could heal and protect them for free, whereas any vodún offering to counter witches would extract a substantial price.
