= Zinkpo =

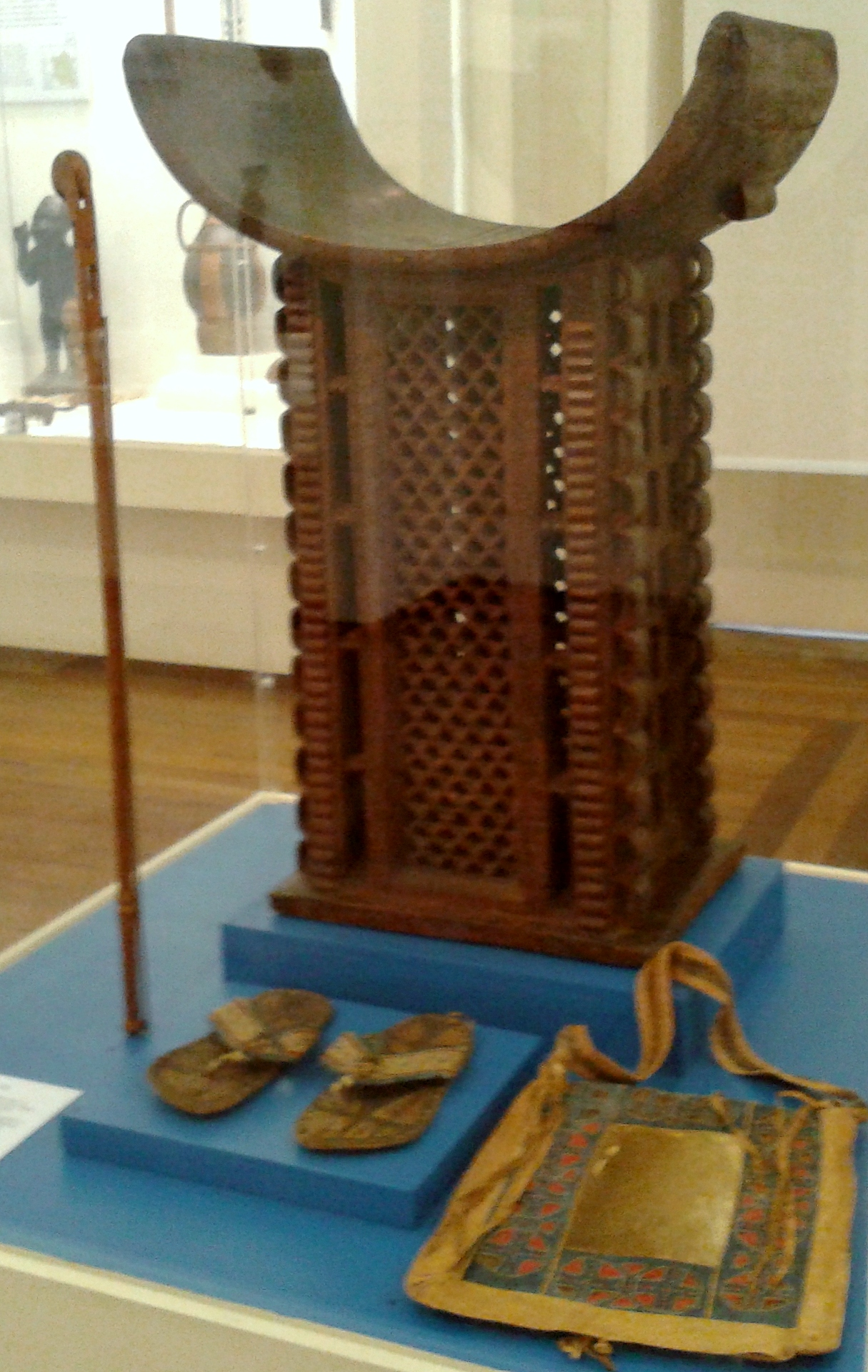
Zinkpo was located in the Kumbukumbu Room: Africa, Memory and Heritage

Zinkpo, also called the Throne of Dahomey, was a royal throne from Dahomey, present-day Benin. It was one of the main objects on display in the Nacional Museum of Brazil, in Rio de Janeiro. The object also received the names zingpogandeme (seat of the king) and zinkpojandeme (seat with braided decoration). It is estimated to have been produced at the turn of the eighteenth and nineteenth centuries. It was exposed in a central showcase in the Kumbukumbu Room, of which was the main highlight.

The dimensions of the throne were 100 x 70 x 40 centimeters. The number in the inventory of 1844 was 6,000, identified as an "African ruled throne, wood carved".

It was a replica of the throne of the seventh king of Dahomey, Kpengla. It was given as a gift by ambassadors of the king Adandozan for the, at that time, prince John VI de Portugal in 1810 or 1811 and integrated to the Royal Museum, former name of the National Museum, in 1818. It was in the exhibition "The Diplomacy of Friendship", which precisely gathered African gifts to John, the Clement.

It was destroyed in the fire of 2018.
