= Agonglo =

King of Dahomey from 1789 to 1797

- King of Dahomey
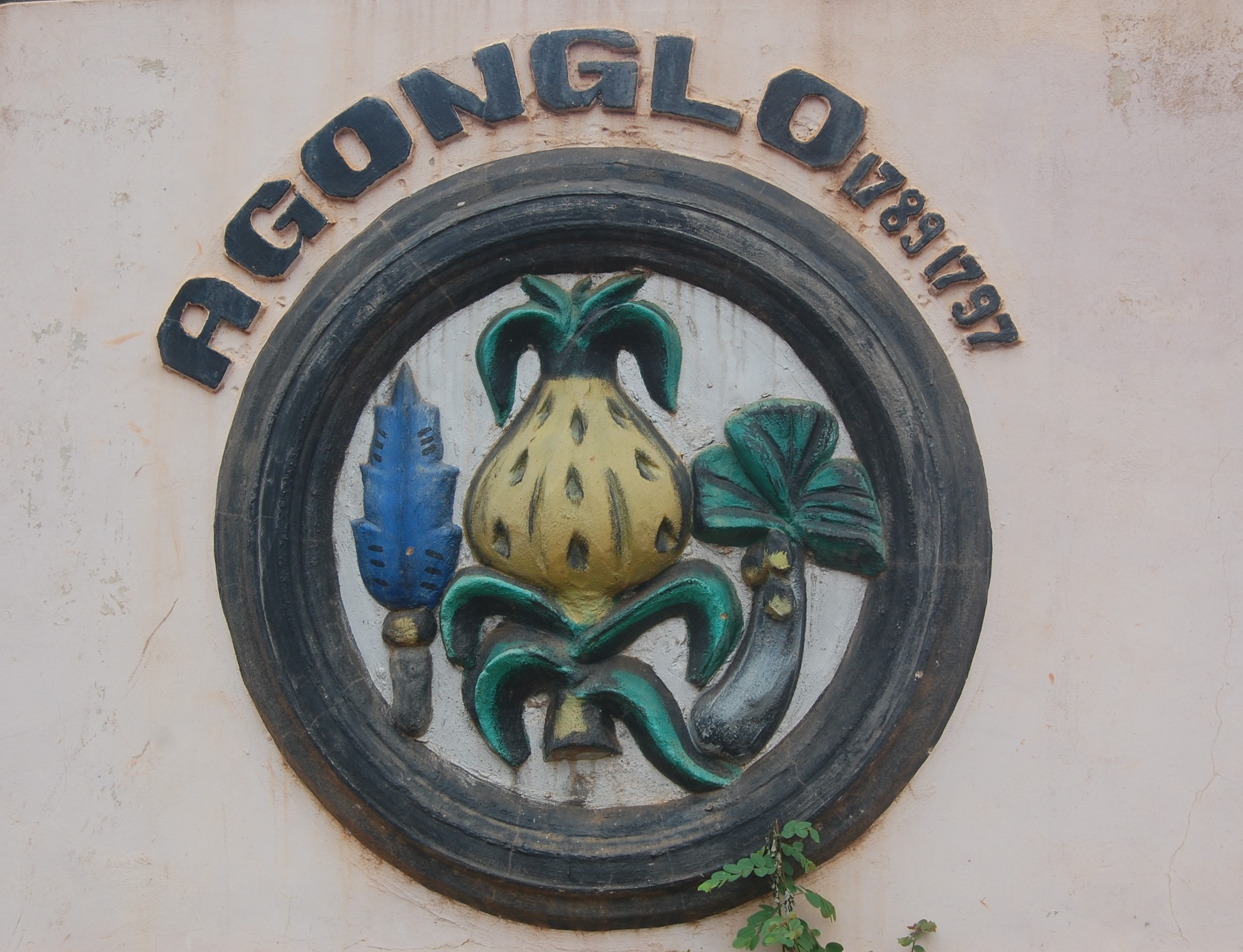
- Symbol of Agonglo in place goho.
- Reign: 1789–1797
- Predecessor: Kpengla
- Successor: Adandozan
- Born: c. 1766
- Died: 1797; Abomey
- House: Aladaxonou
- Father: Kpengla

Agonglo was a King of the Kingdom of Dahomey, in present-day Benin, from 1789 until 1797. Agonglo took over from his father King Kpengla in 1789 and inherited many of the economic problems that developed during Kpengla's reign. Because of the poor economy, Agonglo was often constrained by domestic opposition. As a response, he reformed many of the economic policies (lowered taxes and removed constrains on the slave trade) and did military expeditions to try to increase the supply for the Atlantic slave trade. Many of these efforts were unsuccessful and European traders became less active in the ports of the kingdom. As a final effort, Agonglo accepted two Portuguese Catholic missionaries which resulted in a large outcry in royal circles and resulted in his assassination on May 1, 1797. Adandozan, his second oldest son, was named the new king.

== Rise to power ==
Agonglo was the oldest son of King Kpengla (ruled 1774–1789), who had ruled over a long-term economic crisis in Dahomey. The Oyo empire still had suzerainty over the kingdom and in the time of Kpengla this power of Oyo over the kingdom had resulted in decreased slave trading by Dahomey. Kpengla responded in a variety of ways: first trying to defeat common competitors of both Oyo and Dahomey, then when this failed he ended slave trade with Oyo entirely, raised harsh taxes on slave traders through Dahomey, and resumed slave raiding. These policies largely did not work and the slave trade, which had become the primary trade for Dahomey, slowed significantly.

Political factions were also developing in Dahomey under Kpengla. When Tegbessou (ruled 1740–1774) became king in a contentious selection, two older sons of King Agaja were passed over for selection. The heirs of these two other brothers had slowly increased their power into a distinct rival claim to the throne at Dahomey.

When Kpengla died in 1789, four rival claimants came to the throne: two younger brothers of Kpengla, Fraku or Don Jeronimo (the son of one of the older sons of Agaja), and Agonglo (the oldest son of Kpengla. The Migan and Mehu of Dahomey, who were tasked with selecting the new king, choose Agonglo, but there remained significant political opposition to Agonglo. The selection of Agonglo resulted in such widespread opposition that the political functions of the kingdom largely halted for a year. Agonglo then did a series of conciliatory moves to try to end the opposition: promised to give citizens back some rights, ended constraints on slave traders, reduced taxes, reassigned some of the aggressive tax collectors into the army, and recognized other powerful individuals.

== Administration ==
As king, Agonglo attempted a variety of efforts to get the Dahomey economy started but was often constrained by domestic opposition and a major smallpox epidemic. The Oyo empire which had exercised power over Dahomey since 1730 had grown significantly weak in the early 1790s. This culminated in the suicide of the king of Oyo in 1796, which provided Agonglo with the ability to end the tributary status of Dahomey to Oyo. However, while Agonglo was able to act independently, domestic dissent prevented him from directly challenging Oyo power.

Although he reduced many of the restrictions on slave traders that Kpengla had created, he still followed some of the other policies of Kpengla: including slave raiding and attacking rival ports. However, these were generally not successful with multiple unsuccessful raids against the Mahi people to the north and unsuccessful attacks on Little Popo and Porto-Novo. However, in 1795 he was able to lead a successful slave raid against the Mahi, largely by rewarding soldiers with wives before the war, and allied with Grand-Popo was able to successfully disrupt Little Popo's slave trade.

Unfortunately these efforts to improve the domestic supply of slaves were of limited impact because of developments impacting the different European countries involved in the slave trade. The British commander in the port city of Whydah had become very slow and unresponsive to British regional efforts and so the British had slowed their trade in the port. At the same time, the French Revolution resulted in France banning the trade on slaves in 1794 (to be restored in 1802) and began an active effort to stop the trade by other countries. In November 1794, the French seized all Portuguese slave ships in the port of Whydah and would continue this practice for the next few years. The result was that Whydah no longer was a safe harbor for the trade and Portuguese slowed their trade.

Agonglo responded by sending three ambassadors to Maria I of Portugal to try to convince her to resume trade with Dahomey. Instead of resuming the trade, Maria sent two Catholic missionaries to Agonglo and encouraged him to convert for continued trade relations. Agonglo accepted the missionaries and expressed a willingness to be converted which caused a significant uproar amongst different factions within the kingdom. It is unknown whether he was sincere in his willingness to be converted or whether it was merely to appease the Portuguese. Agonglo did know about Catholicism, having married the former wife of the commander of the French fort in Whydah, a Dutch-African woman named Sophie who had introduced a Christian shrine into the pantheon of deities worshiped.

Regardless, the willingness for conversion resulted in Dogan, a brother of Agonglo, starting serious efforts to remove Agonglo from power. Lengthy debates in the palace followed and when these efforts failed, on May 1, 1797, Dogan and a woman named Na Wanjile assassinated Agonglo in the palace. According to Akingjogbin, she shot and killed Agonglo, but Edna Bay says that the assassination happened through poisoning. Dogan and Na Wanjile were buried alive for the assassination.

== Succession ==
With the execution of Dogan, the Migan and Mehu of Dahomey named Adandozan, the second oldest son of Agonglo, as the new king. Although Adandozan was quite young, he started his reign by punishing all members of the faction that had killed his father executing hundreds and selling the rest into slavery. Those sold into slavery included the future mother of King Ghezo who would replace Adandozan.

Regnal titles
Preceded by Kpengla	King of Dahomey; 1789–1797	Succeeded by Adandozan
