= Queen mother (Africa) =

Female traditional rulers in Africa

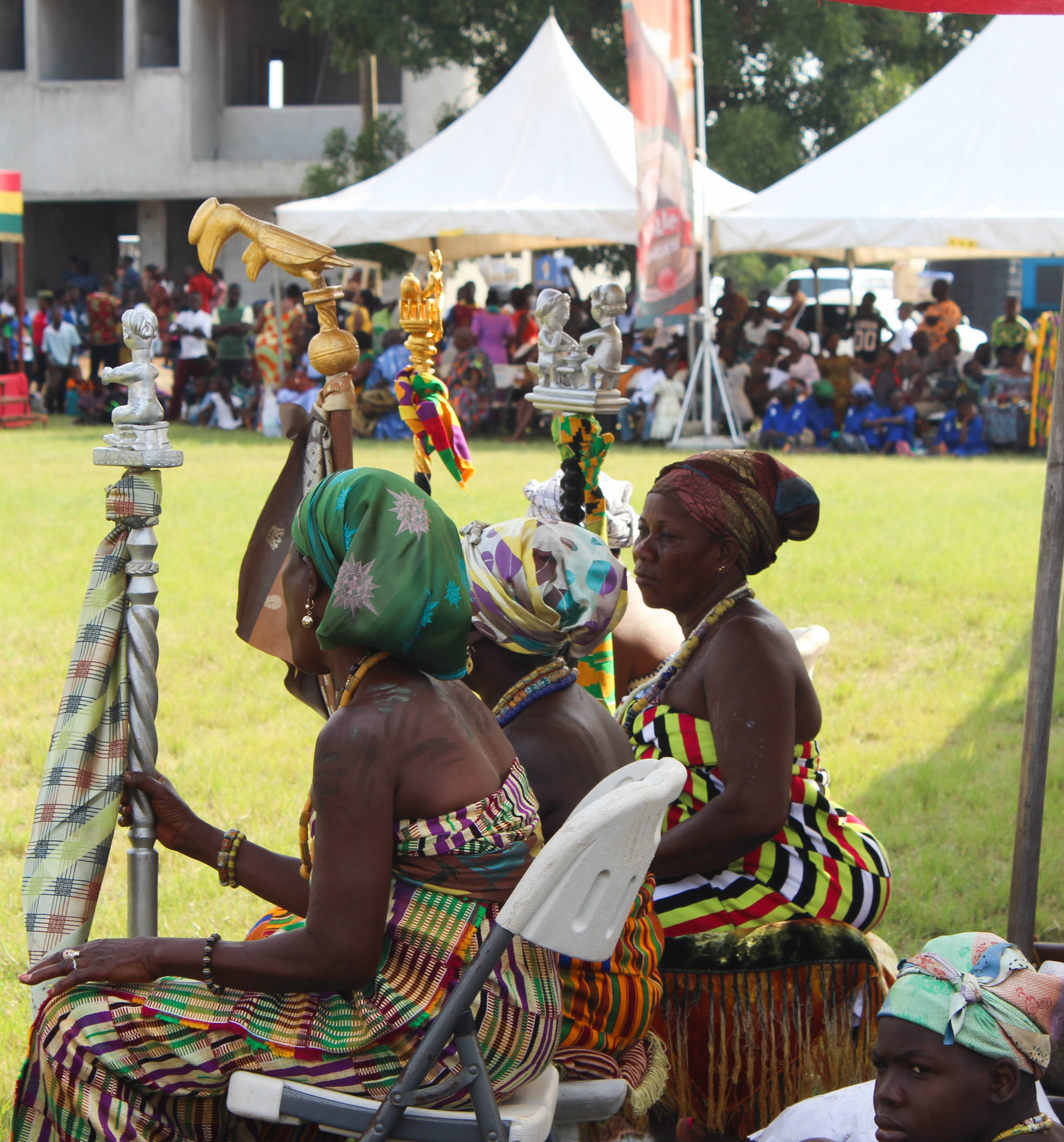
Queen mothers in their regalia

Queen mother (also Queenmother) is a term used to describe certain female traditional rulers in African cultures. Though there is no general description of a "queen mother", as their roles have varied by society, political context, and culture, they generally play an important role in local government and "wield social power and influence."

They are thus an important part of social, political, and cultural institutions across the African continent: the Akan, for example, recognize them as important local political actors and often trace inheritance through them in a matrilineal fashion; whereas in Uganda, the term may be used to describe women who ruled outright. The amount of power queen mothers currently hold has been diminished since pre-colonial times, though the 21st century has seen their influence grow in certain contexts. Many are members of the African Queens and Women Cultural Leaders Network, a voluntary organization.

== History ==
Queen mothers were once important political figures who commanded respect prior to the colonial era. However, the delegation of roles to these figures varied: in some instances, they were considered to be autonomous rulers, in others, they had specific jurisdiction over "women's" issues (or issues that involved both men and women together, such as rape, adultery and marital conflict), in others still, they were simply the literal mothers of prominent figures, and afforded all the status therein.

Colonists from Europe, due to their own sexism, negotiated only with titled men in the areas that they operated in. Queen mothers in Africa, essentially, were not recognized as important and were often referred to in colonial/missionary historical documents as "sisters" of the men in power. The denial of status these women faced facilitated their titles' losses of power - hence, under colonial rule, queen mothers, like other women on the continent, lost "social, religious, constitutional, and political privileges and rights."

Post-colonial governments "continued with policies that undermined women's traditional authority": In 1957, as an example, Ghana's independence leaders did not include queen mothers in their affairs, choosing instead to only work with the male chiefs. Women's absence in politics and, particularly, traditional institutions has created and worsened an unequal distribution of power and resulted in women's "concerns and rights not being adequately addressed."

In 1988, the Ashanti Queen Mother Association was formed. It now has around forty-four women leaders from the Ashanti region as members. The group attends to issues relating to women.

The 1992 Constitution of Ghana included Article 277 which defines chieftaincy. Article 277 defines a chief as a person who has been properly nominated from the correct lineage and "enstooled, enskinned or installed as a Chief or a Queen Mother in accordance with the relevant customary law and usage." In the summer of 2010, the National House of Chiefs in Ghana announced the inclusion of 20 queen mothers. Queen mothers are appointed to the house for four-year terms.

In 2006, the United Nations Children's Fund started working with queen mothers to help support welfare efforts for women and children in different parts of West Africa.

More recently, areas such as the Upper West Region of Ghana, where the tradition of having queen mothers has not been practiced, have been encouraged to "reinstall" queen mothers by advocates of women's empowerment. More women have been installed as queen mothers in the northern part of Ghana, an occurrence which has raised the status of women in the area.

In 2014, the Ghanaian Chieftaincy Minister, Henry Seidu Danaa, declared that queen mothers' participation in the House of Chiefs was constitutional.

== Description and duties ==
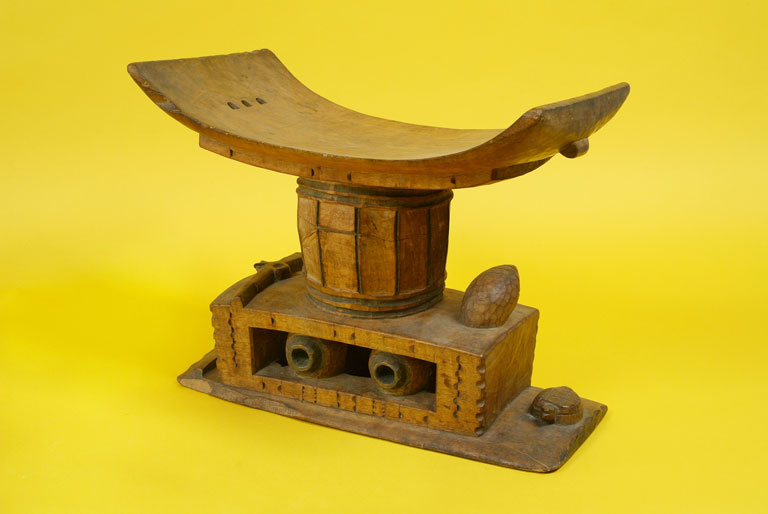
Queen mother's stool

The title of queen mother is an English compound word used to collectively describe women in traditional African leadership roles. The Akan peoples use the term ohemmaa, which means "female ruler". In the Ga tradition, they are called manye or "community mother". In the Pabir tradition, they are known as maigira, a word that means "female monarch." In the Benin tradition, queen mothers are known as iyobas. In the traditions of Yorubaland, a woman who is ritually invested with the title is known as an iya oba or "titled mother of the king".

The office of the queen mother is also known as the "stool". In Ghana, queen mothers are selected from the royal family of each town and village. It is the head of the royal family and the elders who choose both the chief and the queen mother, a pair that might be related to one another. The royal families are made up of the first settlers of an area.

=== Akan tradition ===
In the Akan tradition, queen mothers rule alongside the chief or the king in their area. Queen mothers are considered the spiritual heads of their communities and the keepers of genealogical knowledge. They have veto power of the king or chief and may appoint their own ministers. Queen mothers also select candidates for the next chief if the chief's "stool" is vacant. Queen mothers preside over courts which hear cases about disputes brought to the court by women. In their courtrooms, queen mothers and their court officials "wield power over disputants." When necessary, queen mothers can "assume full control of central authority." In some instances (such as during the reign of Queen Yaa Asantewa), they have "acted as war leaders."

=== Bini tradition ===
The Kingdom of Benin did not have queen mothers until after the end of the fifteenth century when there was a conflict for the throne. During the conflict, women gained power and the first of their number, Queen Idia, became a queen mother. Queen mothers in the Benin tradition are, like those in Western monarchies, the literal mothers of the kings. The classical queen mothers of Benin, each known as an Iyoba, had a great deal of power and were venerated as the protectors of the kings.

=== Burundian tradition ===
In the defunct Kingdom of Burundi, a queen mother was known as a Mugabekazi. This titleholder served as a powerful figure during the reign of either her son or - as was the case with Queen Ririkumutima - her stepson.

=== Dahomeyan tradition ===
Amongst the Fon people of Dahomey, the Kpojito serves as the queen mother. Traditionally, this titleholder had religious appeals, served as a counsel to the king, or Ahosu of Dahomey, and pleaded before him in capital cases. A prominent holder of this title was Queen Hwanjile.

Today the kpojito still holds a position of influence within the kingdom's great council, and also oversees both a significant portion of Dahomey's day-to-day administration and the ceremonial remnant of the famous Dahomey Amazons military unit. She shares this latter function with Queen Hangbe, chief of the name of the Hangbe royal family.

=== Egyptian tradition ===
In ancient Kemet, the title ḥmt-nswt-wrt, commonly translated as "Great Royal Wife," referred to a central female figure within the royal house. Although traditionally rendered in marital terms, the title has been interpreted by some scholars as denoting primary authority and ritual leadership within the institution of kingship, rather than merely conjugal status. Holders of this title have been described as exercising significant roles in governance, succession, and ceremonial life, positioning them as key figures within the structure of power.

Some scholars have questioned the translation of ḥmt-nswt as "Great Royal Wife," noting that ḥmt denotes "woman," and that the title may reflect institutional or political roles rather than strictly marital relationships.

Comparative perspectives have also been used in scholarship to clarify how such titles function beyond strictly marital interpretations. In this context, parallels have been drawn with terms in other cultures—such as the Basque concept of etxekoandrea ("woman of the house")—which denote authority within a household or institutional structure rather than conjugal dependence. Approaches of this kind support readings of titles like ḥmt-nswt-wrt as referring to positions embedded in systems of governance, lineage, and ritual organization, aligning them with broader patterns observed in African queen mother traditions.

The term Pharaoh derives from the ancient Egyptian compound pr‑ꜥꜣ, literally "Great House," which originally referred to the royal palace or institution rather than to an individual ruler.

Many surviving accounts of Kemetian succession were mediated through translations and interpretations by colonial-era scholars, who frequently applied their own cultural frameworks to the historical record. These scholars relied heavily on Greek and Roman sources, which themselves often misunderstood or reshaped Kemetian structures to align with hierarchical and patriarchal norms.

Historians such as Herodotus and Diodorus Siculus, along with later Roman writers, interpreted rulership in terms familiar to Mediterranean monarchies, emphasizing male kingship, linear succession, and familial "legitimacy," even when Kemetian society operated with more flexible, potentially matrilineal or heterarchical structures.

This resulted in several distortions. Women who exercised central governance, ritual, and succession roles were often described only as consorts or secondary figures, while male officials or military leaders were highlighted as "rulers," even when their authority was context-dependent. Titles such as "Great Royal Wife" were framed through Western marital categories rather than reflecting their original institutional context.

Greek and Roman historians also retroactively applied male succession logic, recasting titles and roles to fit Mediterranean expectations and presenting complex or distributed authority as a linear male hierarchy.

There was also selective erasure and reinterpretation of records indicating female lineage, matrilineal succession, or shared governance. These elements were sometimes omitted or reframed to align with narratives of male-centered monarchy.

This pattern is further complicated by modern research, including studies highlighted by the University of Cambridge, which indicate that some Roman writers interpreted ancient Egyptian inscriptions through guesswork, compounding these distortions.

The case of Hatshepsut illustrates these interpretive dynamics. Although original Kemetian texts use feminine grammatical forms, later historians often described Hatshepsut as a male ruler. Subsequent research confirmed that Hatshepsut was female while exercising authority. Some modern accounts have recast her as a consort or emphasized her use of the title "king," framing it as an exception or personal ambition, rather than situating it within the broader context of Kemetian titles and roles.

In modern Egyptology, the ceremonial object traditionally worn on the chin during Pharaonic rituals is often described as a symbol of masculine authority, although no original Kemetian sources explicitly attribute this meaning. Similar chin adornments are documented among the Zo'é people of the Brazilian Amazon, and chin ornaments appear in many cultures without associations to male authority.

Historically and culturally, chin tattoos and ornaments are often linked to women. In several indigenous societies, the chin is a primary location for female markings, serving as rites of passage, indicators of identity, or markers of social and ritual roles. Examples include moko kauae among Māori women, tunniit among Inuit women, and facial tattoo traditions among Chin women in Myanmar, as well as practices among the Dulong people of China, various North American indigenous communities, and Bedouin groups. In contemporary contexts, these traditions continue to carry cultural significance, particularly in processes of cultural continuity and reclamation.

These discussions of translation and interpretation have informed broader scholarly reassessments of women's roles in ancient Kemet. Within this context, titles such as ḥmt-nswt-wrt are increasingly examined not only in linguistic terms but also in relation to political authority, ritual function, and structures of succession. This approach situates prominent women of the royal house within the wider framework of African queen mother traditions, where female-centered offices are understood as integral to governance, lineage, and social organization.

Later, in the Egyptian successor state that was itself ruled by the Muhammad Ali dynasty, the king - now referred to as the Khedive of Egypt - had a consort known as a Khanum whose activities followed the precedent set by the queens and empresses of Ottoman Turkey, whose empire the khedivate had once been part of. Queen Hoshiyar Qadin was arguably the most prominent holder of this latter title.

=== Hausa tradition ===
In the customs of the Hausa peoples, a female ruler was known as either a Kabara or a Magajiya. The old kingdom of Daura, which features prominently in the origin myth of their culture, is said to have had a line of such queens regnant that ended with Queen Daurama II.

Following the establishment of the Sokoto Caliphate in the early 1800s, Magajiya became the title that is held by the most prominent woman in a given emirate - often a relative of its ruling emir, who is expected to preside on his behalf over the company of women in the state that he rules.

=== Kongolese tradition ===
In the old Kingdom of Kongo, a queen mother was known as a Mwene Nzimba Mpungu. She was usually the reigning king's paternal aunt, and was expected to lead the four women that were ex officio members of the Ne Mbanda Mbanda, the kingdom's crown council.

=== Krobo tradition ===
Among the Krobo, there is the "paramount queen mother" and several "lesser" queen mothers ruling under her. Krobo queen mothers have less power than the queen mothers of the Akan tradition do. It is speculated the tradition of the queen mother may have been adopted from the Akan.

The Krobo select queen mothers through a secret election by the elders. After her selection, she is notified of her new role by having white clay smeared on her arm. A ritual installation is performed where she is taught, advised, given a new name and then presented to the chief. Krobo queen mothers are seen as "mothers" of their community and while there is an emphasis on women's affairs for the queen mother, she helps both men and women.

=== Kushite tradition ===
In the Kingdom of Kush, an ancient state that was located in what is today the Sudan, a queen mother was known as a Kandake. She ruled alongside her son the king, or Qore of Kush, and joined him in serving a variety of priestly functions in his kingdom. Holders of the title were so famous that they were mentioned in both the Alexander Romance and the New Testament of the Bible.

=== Malinke tradition ===
In the Mali Empire, a famous medieval state that was located in West Africa, the most important woman in the realm was the Qasa, the senior wife and co-ruler of the ruling emperor, or Mansa of Mali. One of the most powerful holders of the title, Empress Kassi, was a partisan in a plot to overthrow her ex-husband Mansa Sulayman following their divorce.

=== Pabir tradition ===
Pabir queen mothers are expected to become celibate. The Pabir queen mother's role is ceremonial, and her "true power lies in her ability to foment opposition against the king."

=== Serer tradition ===
In the Serer kingdoms of Senegambia, a queen mother was referred to as a Lingeer. She was typically the mother or sister of the reigning king, or Lamane, and ruled her own territory in his kingdom. As with the Akans, dynastic succession was vested in her progeny instead of the lamane's.

=== Swazi tradition ===
Amongst the Swazi people of Southern Africa, the queen mother is known as the Ndlovukati. Joining her son the king, or Ingwenyama of Eswatini, she rules the kingdom of Eswatini in what is essentially a diarchy. Although most of the day-to-day functions of administration are performed by the ingwenyama, the ndlovukati is spiritually prominent due to her officiating during the annual Reed Dance rite.

=== Tswana tradition ===
Amongst the Tswana people, the queen mother is referred to as the Mohumagadi Mma Kgosi. She serves as an advisor to her son the chief, or Kgosi, and is generally held in high esteem by the members of the tribe that he rules. A prominent holder of the title was Queen Ruth, Lady Khama.

=== Yoruba tradition ===
Women of varying ages and ancestries are installed as the "titled mothers of the kings" of the Yoruba. They also have a variety of different functions.

The Erelu Kuti of Lagos, for example, is ranked third in the order of precedence. She serves as regent when the "stool" of the king, or Oba of Lagos, is vacant. As part of the coronation ceremonies for a new oba, she also publicly blesses the candidate prior to his installation. For these reasons, she is regarded as the queen mother of the realm.

Elsewhere, in Egbaland, the Moshade is another example. A titled courtier in the service of the king, or Alake of Egbaland, she is the functionary charged with the responsibility of crowning him. Following this, she also conducts the installations of all of his subordinate chiefs. Due to this, she too claims queen mother as part of her ceremonial style.

In addition to these and other women in Yorubaland that hold the title "iya oba", there is also a class of women that are known as oba obirin or "king of the women". Usually holders of the principal title Iyalode, these figures oversee women's affairs in the various kingdoms and represent their gender in the privy councils of the kings.

== Today ==
Queen mothers today continue to adapt to the changing world and the position has "remained vital." They participate in business and recognize the contributions of midwives.

Queen mothers have helped support breast cancer awareness in Ghana. In order to raise awareness of their role in Africa, four queen mothers from Ghana toured the United States.

Some queen mothers have said that their authority is not as respected as much as the authority of the male chiefs. While many queen mothers and other women in traditional roles have faced obstacles for creating lasting change for women, they continue to organize in order to be represented "in formal political processes." They pursue educational opportunities, like the legal literacy training at libraries in Ghana or workshops.

In Ghana, queen mothers have started the Manya Krobo Queen Mothers Association (MKQMA) in order to help children who have been orphaned because of HIV and AIDS. The group was started by Nana Okleyo. Studies of the association's work in the Manya Krobo District found that it was a good model of how to address the issue of orphans in West Africa, though it did have some limitations. There are approximately 370 queen mothers involved in MKQMA. In addition, the MKQMA, under the leadership of Manye Esther, has developed HIV/AIDS prevention programs and helped support more than 400 orphans.

== See also ==
- Hatshepsut
- Hoshiyar Qadin
- Hwanjile
- Idia
- Ririkumutima
- Ruth, Lady Khama
- Yaa Asantewaa
