= Yovogan =

The yovogan (or yovoghan, yévogan) was a minister or high dignitary of the Kingdom of Dahomey (in the southwest of present-day Benin), charged with the supervision of commerce in Ouidah, particularly that of slaves, and of relations with European traders.

In Fon, yovo means "white" or "European" and gan designates "leader" or "chief". Therefore, yovogan directly translates as "leader of the whites " but equates in modern terms to "Minister of European Affairs".

The first yovogan to was appointed by King Agaja, likely around the year 1733, after the conquest of the Kingdom of Whydah in 1727. Those assuming the role of yovogan played an important role in the political, diplomatic, judicial, economic, and military fields until the end of the 19th century. Disagreements and disputes over the powers of the role between yovogans and their king led to frequent dismissals, and even executions, especially by King Tegbesu, Agaja's successor.
