= Ghezo =

King of Dahomey from 1818 to 1858

- King of Dahomey
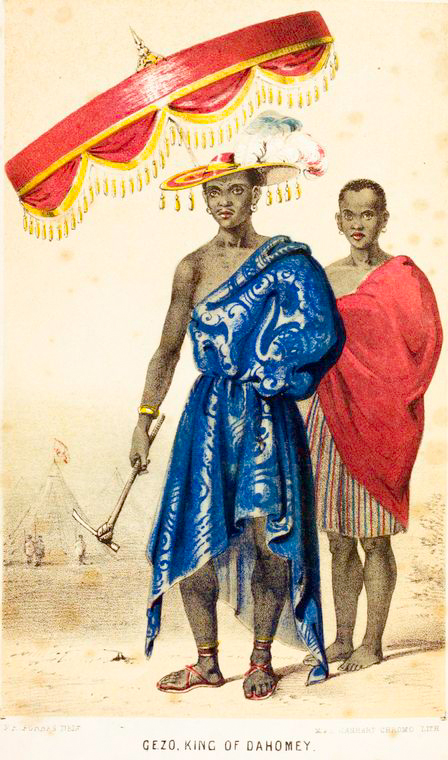
- A depiction of King Ghezo in an 1851 publication
- Reign: 1818–1858
- Predecessor: Adandozan
- Successor: Glele
- Born: 1787; Abomey, Abomey Palace, Dahomey, modern-day Benin
- Died: 1858 (aged 71); Abomey, Abomey Palace, Dahomey, modern-day Benin
- Spouse: Agontime
- Issue: Glele
- House: Aladaxonou
- Father: Agonglo
- Mother: Agontime

Ghezo, also spelled Gezo, was King of Dahomey (present-day Republic of Benin) from 1818 until 1858. Ghezo replaced his brother Adandozan (who ruled from 1797 to 1818) as king through a coup with the assistance of the Brazilian slave trader Francisco Félix de Sousa. He ruled over the kingdom during a tumultuous period, punctuated by the British blockade of the ports of Dahomey in order to stop the Atlantic slave trade.

Ghezo ended Dahomey's tributary status to the Oyo Empire. Afterwards, he dealt with significant domestic dissent, as well as pressure from the British Empire, to end the slave trade. He promised to end the slave trade in 1852, but resumed slave efforts in 1857. Ghezo was assassinated in 1858, and his son Glele became the new king.

== Rise to power ==
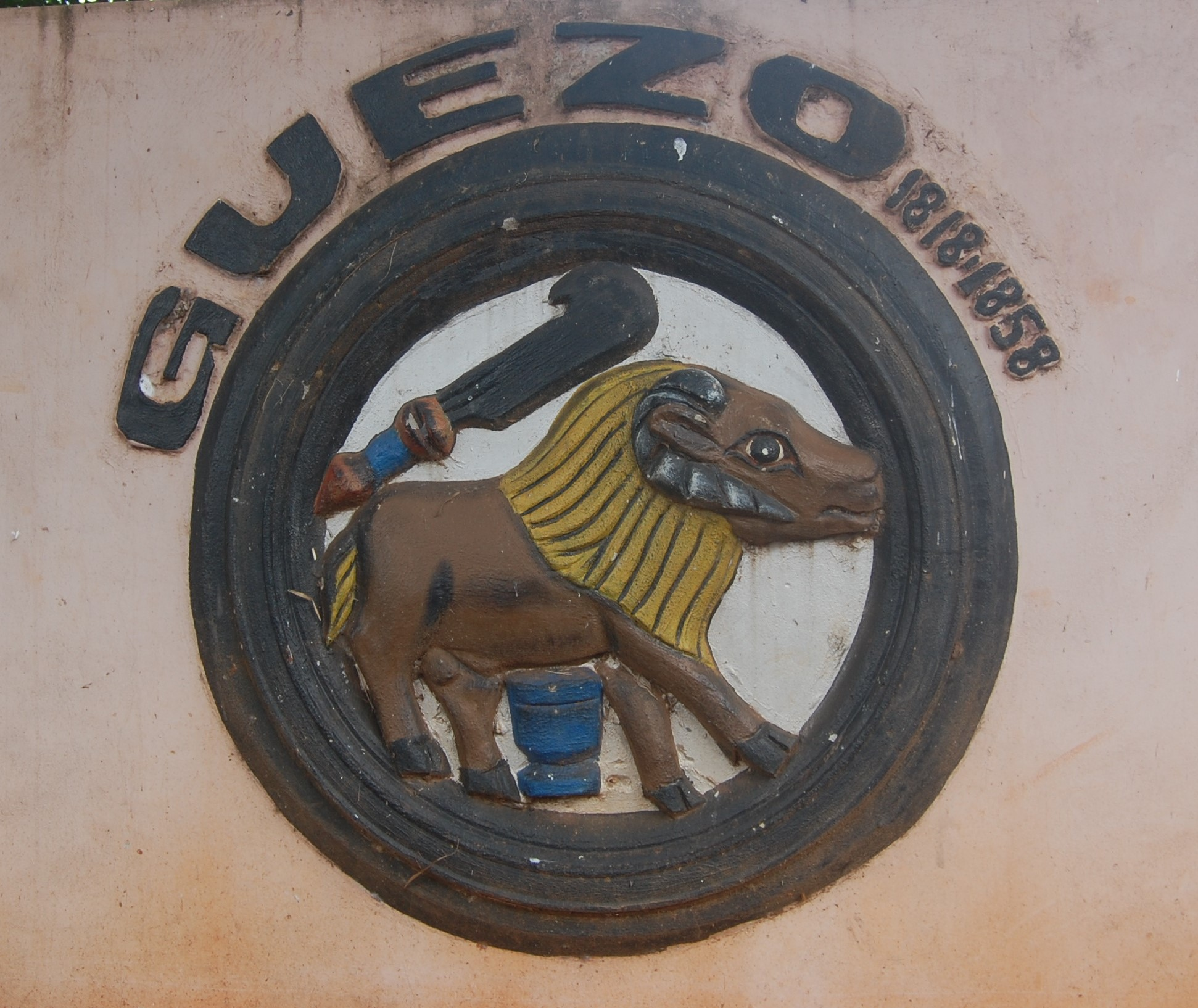
Symbol of Guezo on place goho

Ghezo was a son born with the name Gakpe to King Agonglo and was a younger brother to Adandozan. When Agonglo died in 1797, there was a succession struggle between his sons before Adandozan was enthroned. An oral tradition which developed during Ghezo's rule, to largely erase Adandozan from official history, says that Adandozan was merely named regent and that he refused to step down for Ghezo when the latter was old enough. This is generally doubted by historians.

Information about the final years of Adandozan's administration is very limited, providing only a partial understanding of the situation that resulted in Ghezo's rule. What is known is that around 1818, Adandozan imprisoned Francisco Félix de Sousa, a powerful Afro-Brazilian slave trader, when the latter demanded repayment for money loaned to Adandozan. With the help, reportedly, of Nicola d'Olveira, the son of the Afro-Dutch wife of Agonglo, de Sousa escaped from imprisonment and relocated to Grand-Popo.

While in exile, de Sousa sent gifts and money to Ghezo that Ghezo used to establish support for a challenge to the throne. In the 1818 Annual Customs, it is said that Ghezo appeared holding the war drum in the palace. Upon seeing this, the Migan and Mehu (prime ministers) removed the royal sandals from Adandozan and named Ghezo the king. It is quite likely that the initial struggle was more violent than this story relates.

According to some versions, Ghezo was not named the ruler at this point, but instead was named the regent to rule until Adandozan's son Dakpo was old enough to rule. The story says that this understanding lasted until 1838, when Ghezo instead named his own son, the future king Glele, as the crown prince. At that point Dakpo and Adandozan led a brief fight within the palaces. The fight resulted in a fire that burned part of a palace and killed Dakpo, making Ghezo the clear king of Dahomey.

== Rule ==
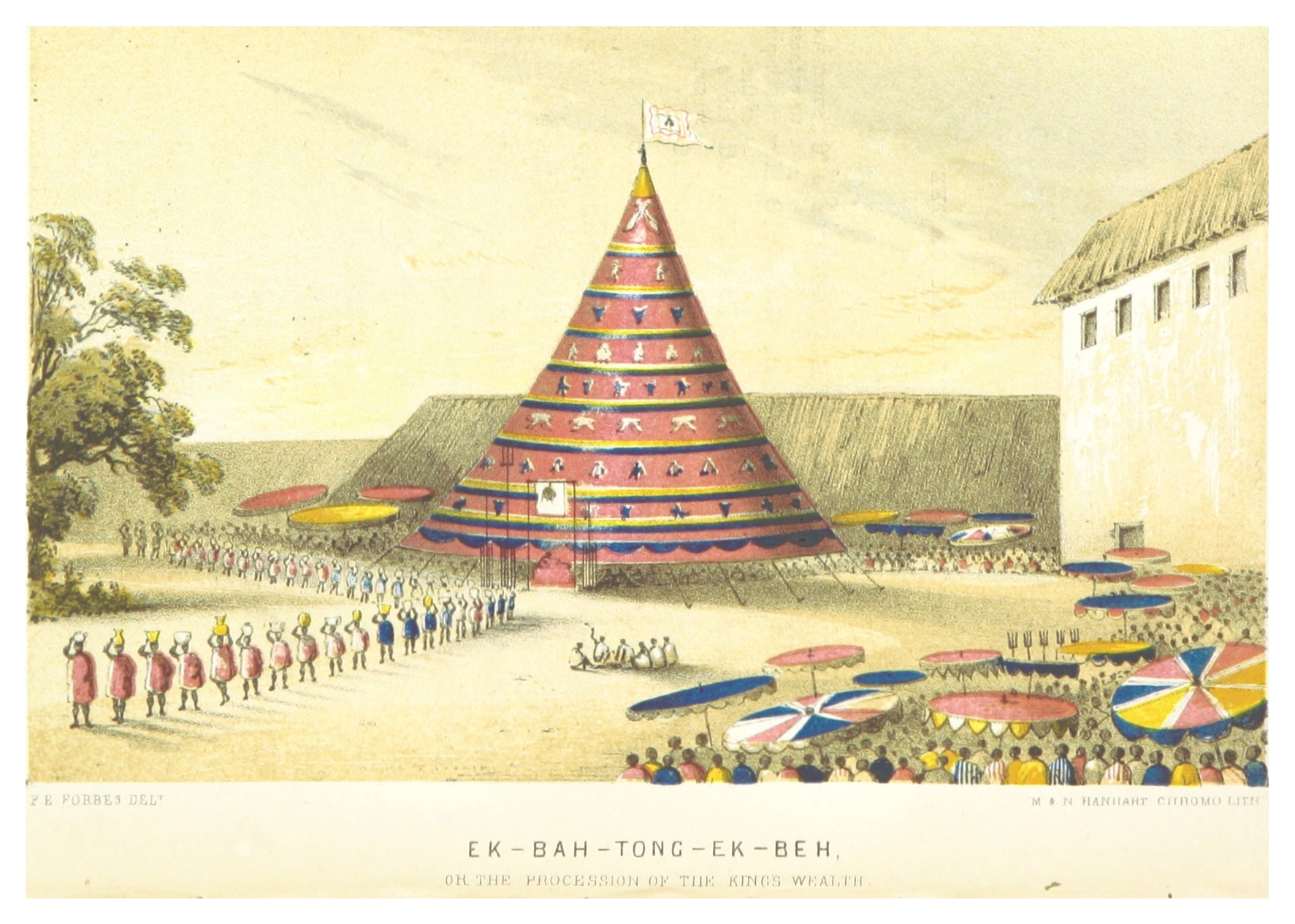
Procession of the wealth of King Ghezo, painted in 1851 by Frederick E. Forbes

Ghezo's rule was defined by some important military victories, domestic dissent, and transformation of the slave trade economy. Ghezo's rule is often remembered as one of the most significant in terms of reform and change to the political order of the kingdom (although some of this is ascribing reforms that happened under Adandozan to Ghezo as part of the erasure of Adandozan's rule). In addition to the military victories, domestic dissent, and slave trade, Ghezo is also credited with expanding the arts significantly and giving royal status to many artisans to move to the capital of Abomey.

=== Military expansion ===
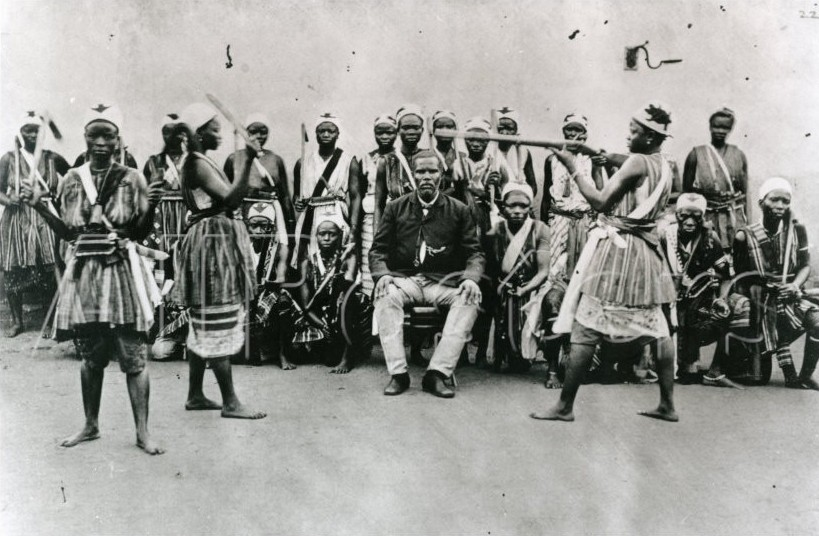
Dahomey Amazons became a significant part of the military under Ghezo.

His most significant military victory was over the depleted Oyo empire in 1823. Since 1730, Dahomey had provided yearly tribute to the Oyo empire and some of its economic and military policy was controlled by Oyo interests. However, the Oyo empire had been significantly weakened over the previous 30 years and, with the rise of the Islamic jihad to the north in the Sokoto Caliphate, the empire was unable to secure its tribute from Dahomey.

In the early 1820s, Ghezo refused to pay the annual tribute to Oyo. Oyo and Dahomey fought a small war early in the 1820s. Violence escalated in 1823 when Oyo sent an ambassador to demand tribute and Ghezo killed him. The Oyo responded by organizing a force made up of the Mahi and other regional forces to attack Dahomey. Ghezo defeated these forces at a battle near Paouingnan. Oyo then sent a larger force that was 4,000 strong, including cavalry, and camped near the village of Kpaloko. Ghezo defeated this force by organizing a night raid which resulted in the death of the Oyo leader, Ajanaku, and caused the Oyo troops to retreat.

Although the victories over the Oyo were important, other military engagements in the early years of Ghezo's reign were less effective. He suffered losses to the Mahi people to the north of Dahomey and was unable to secure enough individuals to meet slave demands, leading him to sell citizens of Dahomey, a quite unpopular decision.

With the further reduction of Oyo power in the region, Ghezo was more able to expand militarily against the Mahi and the Gbe people to the southwest of Dahomey after the mid-1820s. Following victories in these areas, Ghezo focused the military power on a region which had been between the Oyo empire and Dahomey and had been the target of significant slave raiding. After some significant victories in this area by Dahomey, the city of Abeokuta was founded as a safe-haven for people to be free of slave raiding in an easily defended location. By the 1840s, Abeokuta had become a major power in the area and wars between Abeokuta and Dahomey became regular.

In 1849–50, under the direction of British Governor William Winniett, British naval officer Frederick E. Forbes went on two missions to the court of King Ghezo "in an unsuccessful attempt to convince him to end involvement in the slave trade."

In 1851, Ghezo organized a direct attack on the city of Abeokuta, but it did not succeed. Ghezo suspended large-scale military operations when he ended the slave trade (1852). However, by 1858, a conservative faction pressured Ghezo to begin large-scale military operations again with an assault on Abeokuta to follow. It is possible that this renewed warfare between the two states led to Ghezo's death, with some accounts stating that Abeokuta paid for an assassination of Ghezo (other accounts disagree).

Ghezo is credited with the formation of the Mino as an actual war fighting force. Although the female bodyguard for the king had existed for many kings, Ghezo is said often as the king who transformed them into a force for battle. Historian Edna Bay contends that this may have been a result of a need to gain the support of the female palace guard after they had opposed Ghezo's coup against Adandozan. Ghezo did this by raising the status of the female guards, providing them uniforms, giving them additional weapons, and making them a crucial part of war policy.

=== Domestic dissent ===
Domestic dissent was a significant problem throughout Ghezo's reign with different forces contesting his rule. Initially, after the coup against Adandozan, Ghezo had to secure support from a number of different individuals who helped bring him to power. Although he had initially presented himself as able to restore militaristic practices to Dahomey, which he argued Adandozan was unable to do, the early losses in his reign to the Mahi made him very unpopular. It is even reported that in 1825, he offered to return Adandozan to power but that Adandozan refused, hoping for a popular uprising against Ghezo.

To secure the support of different powerful people, Ghezo provided many of them with important positions. To secure the support of other princes, he appointed two of his brothers as the Migan and Mehu and transformed these into hereditary positions which they could pass to their sons. Since de Sousa was of crucial importance in Ghezo's rise to power, he named de Sousa the Chacha at Whydah, a position which would be the principal trade official in that port (and would also be passed to de Sousa's son). As a symbolic strike against Adandozan's legacy, Ghezo appointed Agontime his Kpojito (or queen-mother, an important post in the Kingdom of Dahomey). Agontime was a wife of Agonglo, sometimes claimed to be the mother of Ghezo, who was sold into slavery when Adandozan came to power because she supported a rival to the throne. In São Luís, in the state of Maranhão, she would have founded the Casa das Minas (House of Minas), an important temple that originated the Tambor de Mina, an Afro-Brazilian religion, establishing the cult of the ancestors of the royal family (voduns). According to some versions, Ghezo was able to secure her release from Brazil and bring her back to the kingdom, although evidence of this is not clear.

When ending the slave trade became the crucial issue in the 1840s and 1850s, there developed two distinct factions which historian John C. Yoder has called the Elephant and the Fly parties. Ghezo was the head of the Elephant faction which supported opposition to the British demands to end the slave trade and was supported by key officials and the representatives of de Sousa. The Fly faction, in contrast, supported ending the slave trade and accommodating British demands. The Fly faction grew more powerful with the British naval blockade of 1852 and Ghezo eventually agreed to end the slave trade; however, the Elephant faction and the interests of de Souza's family remained important for the rest of his reign. Historian Robin Law largely believes that the elite factionalism to Ghezo developed in 1856 when he had reduced the slave trade. In that year, a faction for the resumption of the slave trade formed, headed by the Migan and Yovogan (governor of Whydah) which pushed Ghezo toward resuming the slave trade in 1857.

One additional way that Ghezo maintained domestic support was by lengthening the ceremony cycle in the 1850s with additions to the Annual Customs including a ceremony for the palm oil trade, one to celebrate ending tribute to the Oyo empire, and one dedicated to Ghezo himself (but to the time when he was a prince).

== Slave trade ==
When King Ghezo ascended the throne in 1818, he was confronted by two immediate obstacles: the Kingdom of Dahomey was in political turmoil, and it was financially unstable. First, he needed to gain political independence by removing the hold that the Yoruba empire of Oyo had over the Dahomey since 1748. Secondly, he needed to revitalize the Dahomey economy. Both of these objectives relied on the slave trade. King Ghezo implemented new military strategies, which allowed them to take a physical stand against the Oyo, who were also a major competitor in the slave trade. He also put stipulations on Dahomey's participation in the slave trade. Under his reign, the Dahomeans (Fon people) would no longer be sold, as they were under his brother's, Adandozan, leadership. Dahomey would focus on capturing people from enemy territories and trading them instead.

While Brazil's demand for slaves increased in 1830, the British started a campaign to abolish the slave trade in Africa. The British government began putting significant pressure on King Ghezo in the 1840s to end the slave trade in Dahomey. King Ghezo responded to these requests by saying he was unable to end the slave trade because of domestic pressure. Ghezo added:

The slave trade is the ruling principle of my people. It is the source and the glory of their wealth…the mother lulls the child to sleep with notes of triumph over an enemy reduced to slavery

He additionally explained to the British that the entire region had become dependent on the trans-Atlantic slave trade for profit, so ending it in one day would destabilize his kingdom and lead to anarchy. King William Dappa Pepple of Bonny and Kosoko took the same stance towards the British requests. Instead, King Ghezo proposed an expansion of palm oil trade, which according to historian Augustus Adeyinka, would have led to the gradual abolishment of the slave trade. However, Dahomey's palm oil production ran on domestic slavery.

His domestic support had shifted as well, with the declining power of Francisco Felix de Sousa and his death in 1849. By 1850, King Ghezo was on the verge of war with the Egbas of Abeokuta, the new Yoruba capital that arose after the Oyo Empire dissolved. The Egbas, who did not participate in slavery, had set their sights on becoming the new palm oil capital of the region; a title King Ghezo needed to steer the Dahomey Kingdom away for slavery. Ebgas gained the advantage by welcoming Europeans, including missionaries and traders, into Abeokuta. This strategy allowed the Egba to obtain new firearms and other weapons that the Dahomey Amazons did not yet possess. Jealous of the attention and goods that the Egba were received from the British and fearful of what it would mean for Dahomey, King Ghezo decided to act. That same year, he told Consul Beecroft and Commander Forbes that he planned to attack Abeokuta, and if the British did not help him end the palm oil trade in Abeokuta by evacuating the capital, Dahomey would also see the British as an enemy. The issue with this demand is that Abeokuta and Badagry had become headquarters for British missionaries, who sought to "civilize" the Yoruba locals. Thus, Britain sided with the Egba, effectively undermining King Ghezo and the Dahomey's ability to flourish in the palm oil trade and leaving them no means to end their involvement in the slave trade without dissolving the Kingdom of Dahomey.

Vastly outnumbered and outgunned, King Ghezo joined forces with King Kosoko, the Oba of Lagos. Together, they created a plan for the Dahomey to attack Abeokuta while Lagos attacked Badagry simultaneously. In March 1851, the attack was carried out, and the Egba triumphed with British support. It became known as the Battle of Abeokuta. Following the defeat of Dahomey against Abeokuta and the establishment of a British naval blockade on the ports of Dahomey, King Ghezo appealed to the British government and proposed to end the slave trade immediately if the British were willing to pay reparations to Dahomey for their loss of income from slave trading, as Britain had done to slave owners in its Caribbean colonies for freeing their slaves. After they rejected his offer, King Ghezo continued to trade slaves, since palm oil was no longer a lucrative option.

By January 1852, British pressure forced Ghezo to sign an agreement (along with both the Migan and the Mehu) with the British. The agreement specified that Ghezo was to end the slave trade from Dahomey. The British believed that Ghezo never implemented the provisions of this treaty, although he believed he did comply by stopping slave trade through Dahomey's ports even though he allowed slaves to be traded from Dahomey to other ports and then sold into the slave trade.

The decrease in the slave trade resulted in additional reforms during the last years of Ghezo's rule. He significantly reduced the wars and slave raids by the kingdom and in 1853 told the British that he reduced the practice of human sacrifice at the Annual Customs (possibly ending sacrifice of war captives completely and only sacrificing convicted criminals) However, these positions were reversed dramatically in 1857 and 1858 as Ghezo became hostile to the British; he revived slave trade through the port of Whydah, and in 1858, Dahomey attacked Abeokuta. The decision to attack Abeokuta had been resisted by Ghezo, but there was significant domestic pressure on Ghezo that the attack had been allowed to happen.

== Death and succession ==
The details of Ghezo's death are different depending on the historical source. It is claimed that there was a prophecy made in the early 1850s that if Ghezo attacked the city of Ekpo, under the control of Abeokuta, he would die as a result. This may explain his resistance to the war against them in 1858. Regardless, he died very soon after the campaign in 1859. Various causes of death have been suggested, including poisoning by Dahomey priests upset at the ending of human sacrifice, smallpox, or death in battle. However, he was likely assassinated by a sniper hired by his enemies from Abeokuta.

During the last years of his life, his heir Glele became the leader of the faction that wanted the resumption of the slave trade. Glele was the official heir, but he was not the oldest son; he was challenged in his attempt to rule but was supported by the conservative faction. Many of the reforms attempted by Ghezo were partially undermined by Glele, who began slave trading, warfare, and human sacrifice to some extent.

== In popular culture ==
Ghezo is featured in the novel Flash for Freedom! by George MacDonald Fraser, as well as in Frank Yerby's 1971 novel, The Dahomean. He is also mentioned in the historical novel Segu by Maryse Condé, which notes the prophecy that he would die of smallpox. King Gezo is mentioned in Anni Domingo’s 2021 novel Breaking the Maafa Chain, in which the Royal Navy rescues a young slave from sacrifice in his kingdom. In the 1957 film Band of Angels, former slave trader Hamish Bond (Clark Gable) tells stories about Ghezo's exploits, referring to the origins of the slave trade in Dahomey.

Today, a major Benin Armed Forces base in Cotonou is named 'Camp Ghezo' after the former king.

Actor John Boyega portrays a fictionalized Ghezo in the 2022 American historical epic film The Woman King.

== See also ==
- Sarah Forbes Bonetta
- History of the Kingdom of Dahomey

Regnal titles
Preceded by Adandozan	King of Dahomey; 1818–1858	Succeeded by Glele
