= Bossou Ashadeh =

Bossou Ashadeh is a loa, the spirit of the deceased Dahomean king Tegbessou in Vodou, especially in Haiti. In his petro manifestation, Bossou is often depicted as a horned bull.
