= Akaba of Dahomey =

King of Dahomey from 1685 to 1716

Akaba
- King of Dahomey
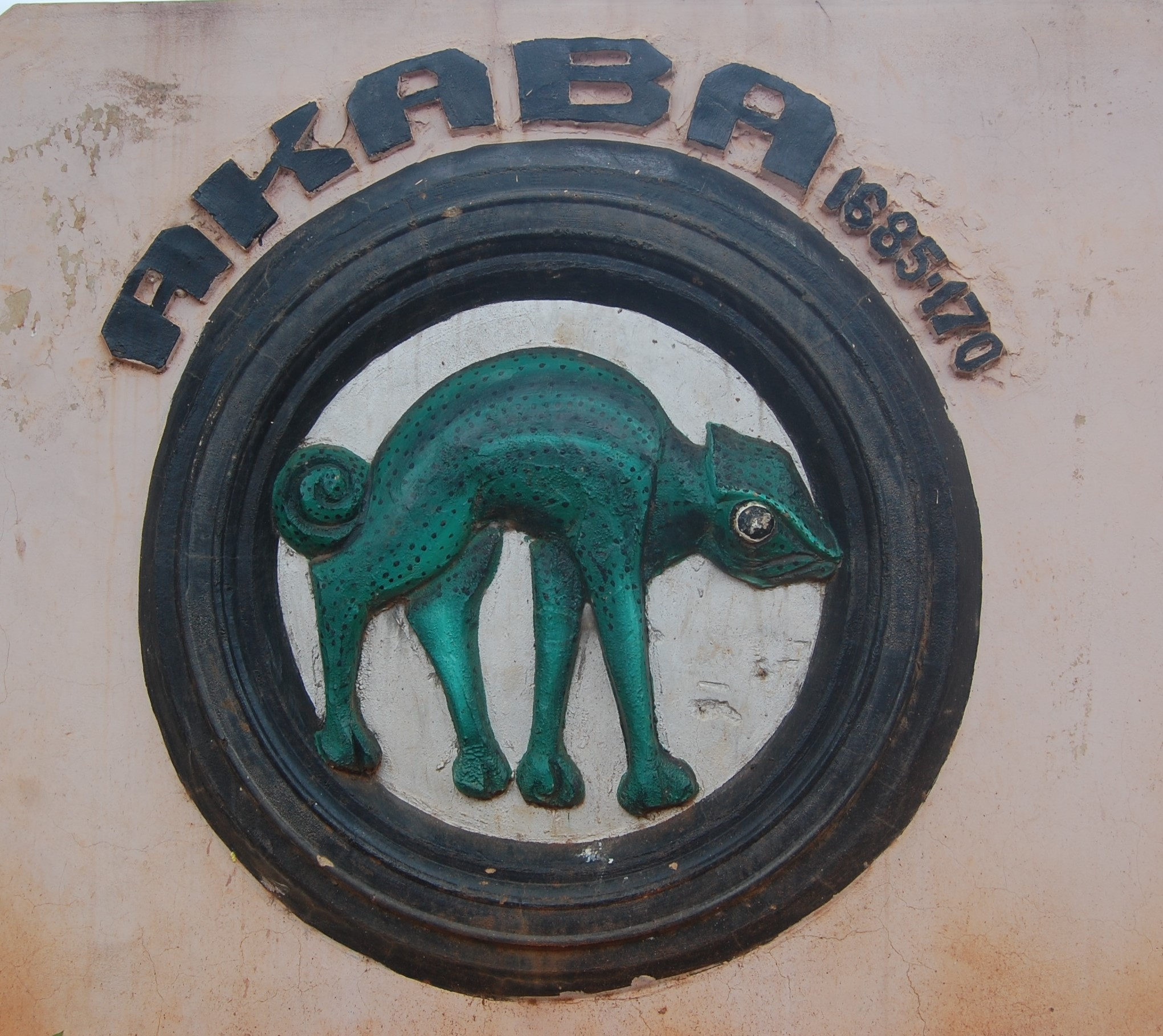
- Symbol of Akaba's chameleon on Place Goho in Abomey in 2020.
- Reign: 1685–1716
- Predecessor: Houegbadja
- Successor: Agaja (or Hangbe)
- Died: 1716; Ouémé River Valley
- House: Aladaxonou
- Father: Houegbadja

Akaba also known as Adahunzo or Housseou was an early King of the Kingdom of Dahomey, in present-day Benin, from 1685 until c.1716. King Houegbadja had created the basic structure of the kingdom on the Abomey plateau. His first children were the twins of Akaba and Hangbe and they were followed by another son of Houegbadja who would become King Agaja. As the oldest son, Akaba became the king upon Houegbadja's death and ruled until 1716 when he died during battle in the Ouémé River Valley, either of small pox or in battle. When he died his sister, Hangbe, became the ruler and began preparing Akaba's oldest son, Agbo Sassa, for the throne. In 1718, Agaja, the next oldest son after Akaba from Houegbadja, fought with Agbo Sassa and Hangbe and became the next King of Dahomey.

== Symbol ==
The chameleon symbolized his adaptability of policies.It was also a symbol of his patience to wait to ascend to the throne (as he ascended the throne in such an old age), inspired from the quote "The chameleon walks slowly but can go far, and he will never break even the finest branch he walks on the bombax tree".The king was also symbolized by a boar.

== King of Dahomey ==
Oral tradition records that Akaba was the eldest born child of Houegbadja with a twin sister named Hangbe. In addition, Houegbadja also had a younger son named Dosu (the traditional name for the first male born after twins in Fon) who would later take the name Agaja. As the oldest son, Houegbadja named Akaba his heir before he died and Akaba assumed the throne in 1685 upon his father's deaths. In some versions, Akaba is the king who kills the chieftain Dan to establish the dominance of the Dahomey Kingdom over the Abomey plateau, rather than Houegbadja.

Akaba's administration continued military expansion off the Abomey plateau and increasing centralization of the kingdom over the region. Some of his most significant military activity was in the Ouémé River valley. During this campaign in around 1715–1716, Akaba died either of smallpox, poisoning, or in battle. Because his death was quite sudden, and his heir was still young, Edna Bay contends that his twin sister Hangbe became the ruler until Agaja forcibly replaced her and the oldest son of Akaba, Agbo Sassa, to take over the throne.

Regnal titles
Preceded by Houegbadja	King of Dahomey; 1685–1716	Succeeded by Hangbe
