= Hwanjile =

Dahomeyan priestess (r. 1740–1774)

Hwanjile (r. 1740–1774) was a high priest and kpojito ("reign mate") of the African Kingdom of Dahomey, in what is now Benin.

== Life ==
Hwanjile was an Aja woman from the village of Home in an area west of Abomey, in the southern portion of modern-day Benin. She was reportedly already an adult with two children when she was brought, either as a war captive or trader, to the palace of Abomey. Hwanjile was married to the king Agaja before she was appointed to the position of kpojito ("Mother of the Leopard") by Tegbesu, the fourth king of Dahomey. Her kin included the powerful Adanle, Hodonour, and Kossou-Naeton families of merchants in the town of Ouidah.

== Political and religious involvement ==
The oral histories which are our chief source of information about eighteenth-century Dahomey do not explain why Hwanjile allied herself with Tegbesu, but they do state that Hwanjile played a pivotal role in Tegbesu's accession to the throne, displacing his older brother. As a result of this assistance, Tegbesu named Hwanjile kpojito, a position which made her the richest and most powerful woman in the kingdom. This term is often translated as "queen mother" in English, though this is not entirely accurate. To be kpojito was to be a female "reign mate" of a king through an either literal or symbolic mother-son relationship, representative of a balancing of royal power, and to possess the authority to resolve religious disputes.

Hwanjile solidified her and Tegbesu's rule through manipulation of religious beliefs, particularly those centered on the Dahomean vodun or gods. She imported two creator gods, Mawu and Lisa, from Aja and proclaimed them the rulers of the Dahomean pantheon. Hwanjile established a home for them directly outside the royal palace, where she served as their powerful high priest. She also encouraged the use of fa divination.

== Legacy ==
Due to the key role which she played in creating a strong, centralised kingdom in less than a generation, Hwanjile is considered one of the most important figures in the history of Dahomey, and indeed of modern-day Benin. Following Hwanjile's death, she was replaced by a direct descendant who took on her name and her functions. This system of perpetual succession still continues, and successive Hwanjile have continued to be politically powerful.

In addition, a number of the gods introduced by Hwanjile are worshipped today in Benin.
