= Tegbesu =

King of Dahomey from 1740 to 1774

- King of Dahomey
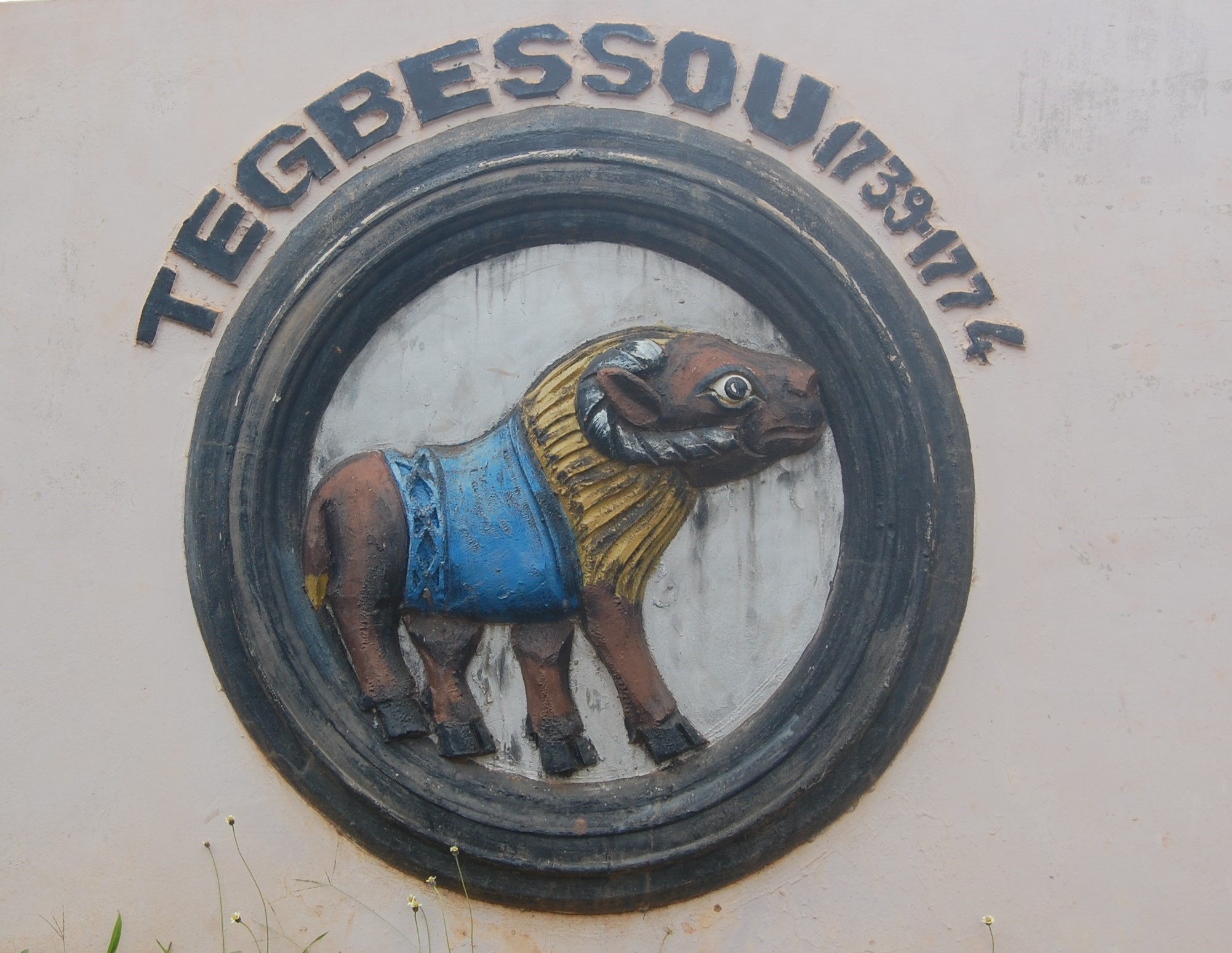
- The symbol of Tegbessou of the buffalo in a tunic at Place goho in Abomey
- Reign: 1740–1774
- Predecessor: Agaja
- Successor: Kpengla
- Died: 1774
- House: Aladaxonou
- Father: Agaja
- Mother: Hwanjile

Tegbesu (French: Tegbessou) or Bossa Ahadee was a king of the Kingdom of Dahomey, in present-day Benin, from 1740 until 1774. While not the oldest son of King Agaja (1718-1740), he became king after Agaja's death following a succession struggle with a brother.

== Rise to power ==
Oral traditions hold that Tegbesu was the son of Agaja and Hwanjile, a woman reported to have brought Vodun to the kingdom. King Agaja had significantly expanded the Kingdom of Dahomey during his reign, notably conquering Allada in 1724 and Whydah in 1727. This increased the size of the kingdom and increased both domestic dissent (with the royal aristocrats of both Allada and Whydah opposing Dahomey from fortified islands off the coast) and regional opposition (mainly with semi-regular warfare between Dahomey and the Oyo Empire). According to one oral tradition, as part of the tribute owed by Dahomey to Oyo, Agaja had to give to Oyo one of his sons. The story claims that only Hwanjile of all of Agaja's wives was willing to allow her son to go to Oyo. This act of sacrifice, according to the oral tradition made Tegbesu favored by Agaja. According to an oral tradition Agaja told Tegbesu that he was the future king, but his brother Zinga was still the official heir.

One oral history relates that with the death of Agaja, Tegbesu's brothers quickly plotted to kill him. His brothers surrounded his house to prevent him from reaching the Palace and claiming the throne, but he miraculously escapes and reached the palace. Despite challenges, the Great Council appointed Tegbesu the new king. Historian Edna Bay notes that oral histories disagree about precisely who appointed Tegbesu as the new king.

== Administration ==
Tegbesu ruled over Dahomey at a point when it needed to increase the recognition of its legitimacy over those who it had recently conquered. Tegbesu is often credited with a number of administrative changes in the kingdom in order to establish the legitimacy of the kingdom.

Since he had spent significant time during his youth in Oyo, much of the kingdom was fashioned along administrative aspects of that empire. Tegbesu returned the capital from Allada to Abomey, while creating a puppet king to rule in Allada. He increased the number of wives of the king in order to establish wide family connections throughout the kingdom. The Palace complex was styled along those of Oyo and a number of administrative positions were created that had existed in Oyo. Tegbesu had multiple officials opposed to his rule in Ouidah put to death and replaced with individuals loyal to him. In addition, instead of having different administrative positions to deal with each different European power, he created the Yevogan in 1745, a central bureaucrat to deal with all European trade.

In addition, Tegbesu's rule is the one with the first significant kpojito or mother of the leopard with Hwanjile in that role. The kpojito became a prominently important person in Dahomey royalty. Hwanjile, in particular, is said to have changed dramatically the religious practices of Dahomey by creating two new deities and more closely tying worship to that of the king.

The slave trade increased significantly during Tegbesu's reign and begun to provide the largest part of the income for the king, reportedly earning him £250,000 per year (over £56 million adjusted for inflation as of 2020 according to the Bank of England Inflation Calculator).

== See also ==
- Bossou Ashadeh
- History of the Kingdom of Dahomey
- Hangbe

Regnal titles
Preceded by Agaja	King of Dahomey; 1740–1774	Succeeded by Kpengla
