= Kpojito =

Title of Dahomean queen mother

The kpojito was the queen mother and consort of the pre-colonial African kingdom of Dahomey (modern-day Benin, West Africa).

== History ==
Beginning in the early eighteenth century, the kpojito was a wife of the king's father, often born of common origin, or into slavery. She rose in rank by merit to serve as the coregent of the ruling king, and sometimes his predecessor.

A kpojito shared power with local princes (serving as their protégé and kingmaker), and had the authority to resolve religious disputes through her skill as a priestess to the vodun (gods). The most famous kpojito was Hwanjile, who reigned with King Tegbesu in the mid-eighteenth century.
