= Kumbukumbu Room =

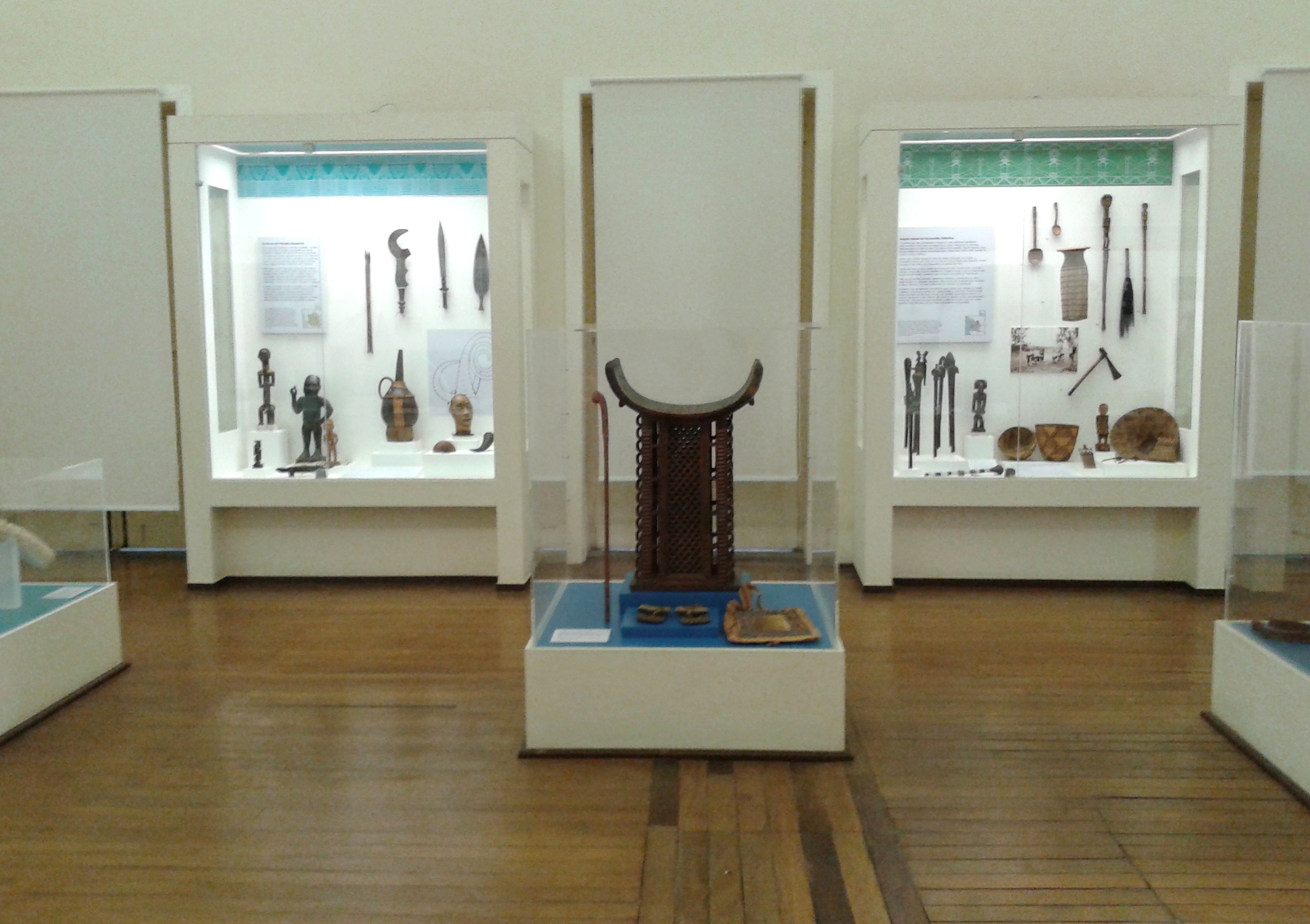
General view room with African and Afro-Brazilian objects, in the National Museum. (2015).

The Kumbukumbu Room, or Kumbukumbu Room: Africa, Memory and Heritage, or Kumbukumbu Exhibition, was one of the spaces of the National Museum of Brazil, destroyed by the fire of 2018. The name of the room refers to a word in Swahili, used for "objects, people or events that make us think about the past."

In the room, objects from the African and Afro-Brazilian collections were on display. In particular, the collections Police of the Court and Heloísa Alberto Torres were featured. Also in the room were the set of gifts from Africa sent to John, the Clement, in 1810, including the Throne of the King of Dahomey. Most of the objects on display were from the 19th century.

The room was organized from nine showcases, six side and three central, and a map from which one could establish the origin of the exposed pieces. According to the official book of presentation of the exhibition:

“	Walking through the exhibition room clockwise, from the front door, we have the first showcase, Africa, past and present, which gives an overview of the African continent; the second deals with the colonial war; the third exhibits objects from the equatorial forest peoples and is related to the central showcase, which shows a large elephant tusk; the fourth presents Angola after the Atlantic slavery; and fifth, the gifts sent by the king of Dahomey to the king of Portugal as part of its diplomacy of friendship.The flag and throne are also part of this group, which are exhibited in the two other central windows. The last showcase is devoted to the Africans in Brazil, covering both Africans born in Africa and their descendants.	”

== Division ==
The room was divided into six spaces:

- The Diplomacy of Friendship
- The colonial war
- Africans in Brazil
- Angola after the Atlantic slavery
- The people of the equatorial forest
- Africa past and present
