= Kpengla =

King of Dahomey from 1774 to 1789

- King of Dahomey
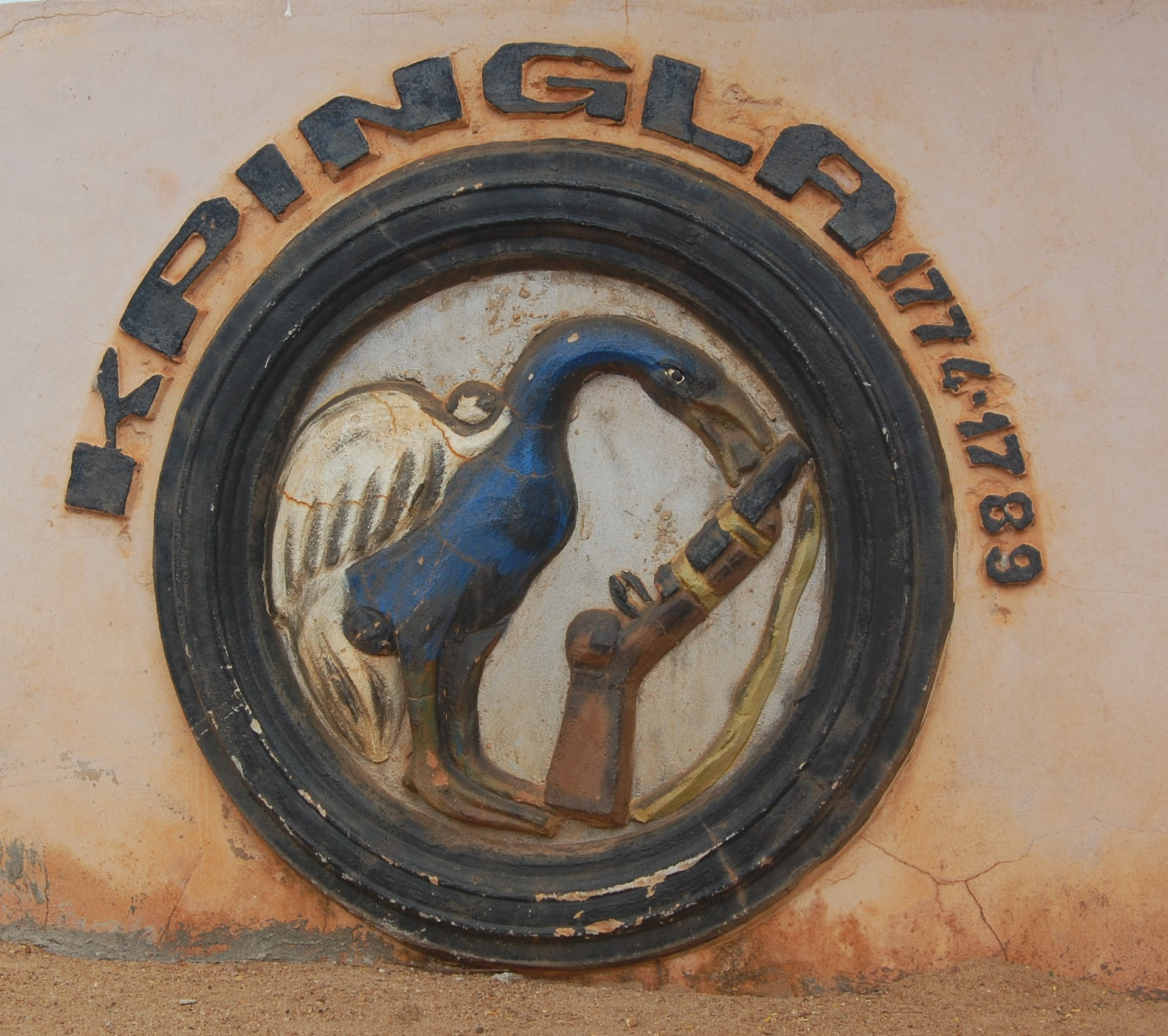
- Symbol of Kpengla in place goho.
- Reign: 1774–1789
- Predecessor: Tegbessou
- Successor: Agonglo
- Born: c. 1735
- Died: 1789
- House: Aladaxonou
- Father: Tegbessou

Kpengla was a King of the Kingdom of Dahomey, in present-day Benin, from 1774 until 1789. Kpengla followed his father Tegbessou to the throne and much of his administration was defined by the increasing Atlantic slave trade and regional rivalry over the profits from this trade. His attempts to control the slave trade generally failed, and when he died of smallpox in 1789, his son Agonglo came to the throne and ended many of his policies.

== Rise to power ==
The Kingdom of Dahomey had increased significantly in power since the 1720s. King Agaja (1718-1740) had expanded the kingdom to the key Atlantic ports of Whydah and Allada. Agaja's son King Tegbessou (1740-1774) had similarly expanded the kingdom. However, the kingdom remained a tributary to the Oyo Empire, owing yearly gifts to the Oyo Empire. The slave trade had increased substantially along the coast with European traders. During the last years of Tegbessou's reign, the Oyo Empire began restricting the slave trade through Dahomey and channeling slaves to other ports or to charge high prices through Dahomey. The shortage became so problematic that Tegbessou was forced to sell his own slaves to keep the trade going.

It is not entirely clear whether Kpengla was the named heir of Tegbessou; regardless, upon Tegbessou's death, he rushed with armed companions to the Royal Palace to make a claim to the throne. Large scale fighting occurred in the palace and it is reported that 285 women in the palace fighting died. Following this struggle, Kpengla was named king. Kpengla made attempts to improve relations with the Ashanti Empire. Diplomatic missions were exchanged between Asantehene Osei Kwadwo and Kpengla. It may have been through these missions that the Togo hills became recognized as the neutral zone between both states.

== Slave trade policy ==
Kpengla became king at a particularly difficult period of history for the kingdom. The slave trade was the major economic resource for the kingdom and the king's personal finances, but Oyo and other inland traders had begun raising rates and playing port cities against one another. Kpengla had the opportunity to either improve the kingdom's position as middleman or to start slave raiding which would cause anger by Oyo and others. At Kpengla's coronation, he vowed to free Dahomey from the Oyo Empire in terms of both ending the tributary status of Dahomey to Oyo and breaking their control over the slave trade.

Kpengla initially attempted to negotiate a situation with the Oyo Empire that would cement the position of Dahomey as middleman between Oyo and the Europeans. The proposal was that Dahomey would destroy eastern slave ports which were taking trade away from Dahomey and Oyo ports, forcing the Europeans to trade with their ports. Kpengla believed that this situation would result in the Oyo moving their trade from rival ports like Porto-Novo into the Dahomey port of Whydah. As a result, Kpengla destroyed Epe in 1782 and Badagry in 1784. Having fulfilled his part of the agreement, Kpengla grew angry when Oyo and Porto-Novo continued to trade actively as a rival port to Whydah.

As a result, Kpengla reformed trade policy to ban all trade in slaves with Oyo in 1786. The next year, he created a royal monopoly over trade at Whydah, controlling all English and French imports (except for Brazilian tobacco). In addition, he set price controls significantly decreasing the price of slaves into the kingdom. Traders who attempted to work around the price controls were executed or sold as slaves themselves. Traders resisted this and decided not to sell slaves at all. Kpengla responded by forcing sale by the traders. These policies resulted in significant movement of trade away from Dahomey and to other ports and so in 1788, he began slave raiding once again.

== Construction ==
Kpengla was crucial in significant amount of construction in Abomey and the kingdom. Kpengla may have been the king to establish the royal road of Dahomey, a wide road from Whydah to Cana and then to Abomey. This width of this road and its maintenance were unique in West Africa for the time and the Cana to Abomey stretch was maintained and impressed European visitors for the next century. Lionel Abson, head of the English fort at Whydah, first reported of the project in the 18th century. According to Abson, in 1779 the king;

ordered all his subjects to set about clearing the paths, giving each caboceer (chief) a string, measuring ten yards, the intended width of roads. Thus a spacious communication was opened, not only between each town and the capital, but all the way down to the beach [at Why-dah]. With incredible labour and fatigue, a passage was cut through the wood at Apoy; the gullies were filled up, and the hurdle bridges, over the swamps, were widened. When this work was completed, the King said, with a vainglorious air, If any one be desirous of paying me a visit, he shall not have it to say, that thorns or briars impede his march....

— Abson.

== Death ==
Kpengla died in 1789 from smallpox and his son Agonglo became the new king after a violent struggle in the palace that resulted in hundreds of deaths. Agonglo largely ended Kpengla's slave trade restrictions and allowed slave traders to set their own rate.

== See also ==
- History of the Kingdom of Dahomey

Regnal titles
Preceded by Tegbessou	King of Dahomey; 1774–1789	Succeeded by Agonglo
