= Francisco Félix de Souza =

Portuguese-Brazilian slave trader (1754–1849)

Francisco Félix de Sousa
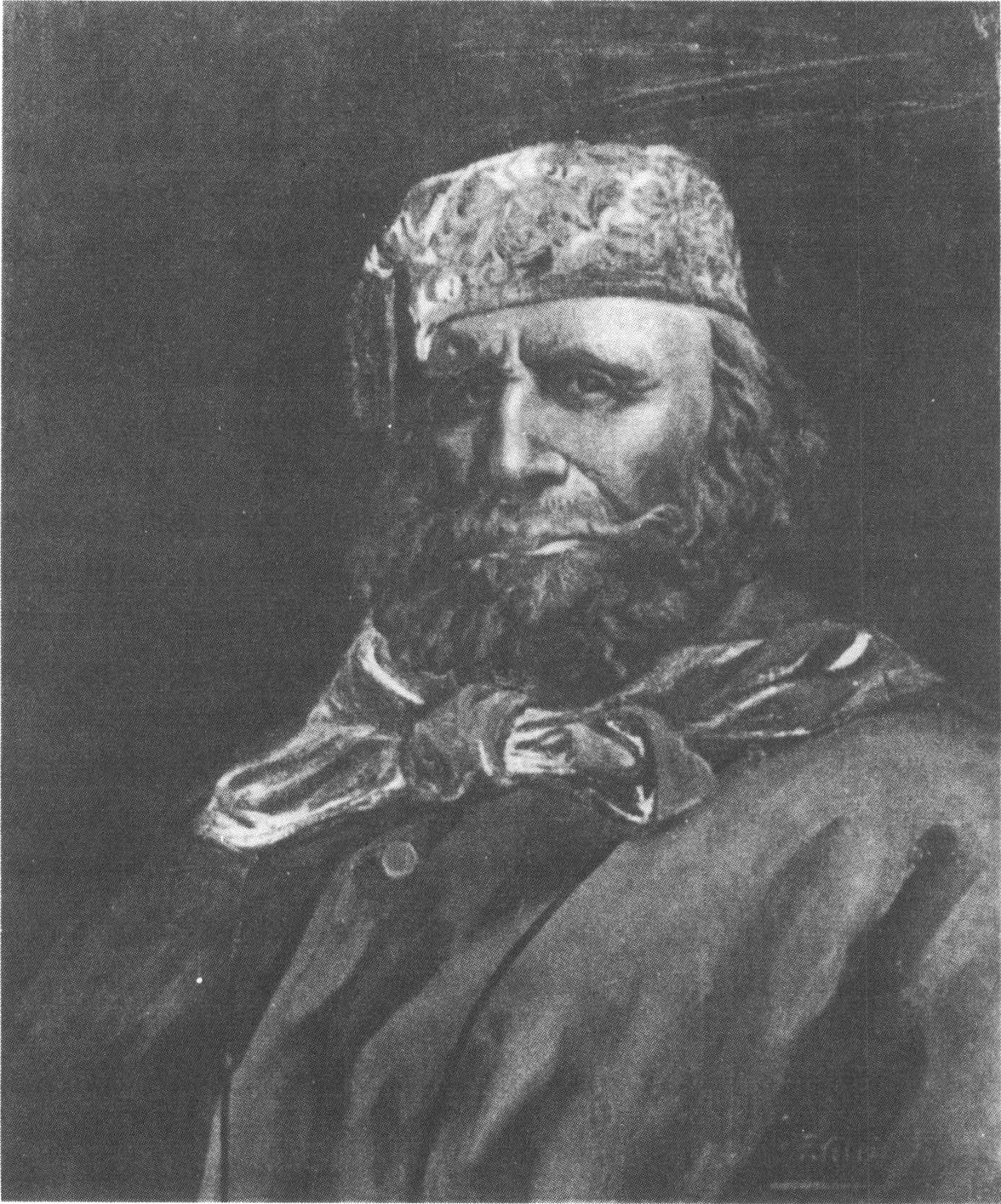
- Born: 4 October 1754; Salvador, Bahia, Colonial Brazil
- Died: 8 May 1849 (aged 94); Ouidah, Kingdom of Dahomey (present-day Republic of Benin)

Francisco Félix de Souza (5 October 1754 – 8 May 1849) was a Brazilian slave trader who was deeply influential in the regional politics of pre-colonial West Africa (now Benin, Togo and Nigeria). He founded Afro-Brazilian communities in areas that are now part of those countries and went on to become the "chachá" of Ouidah (the slave-trading hub for the region), a title that conferred no official powers but commanded local respect in the Kingdom of Dahomey, where, after being jailed by King Adandozan of Dahomey, he helped Ghezo ascend the throne in a coup d'état. He became chacha to the new king, a curious phrase that has been explained as originating from his saying "(...) já, já.", a Portuguese phrase meaning something will be done right away.

His early years in Africa are well documented in a long article (in Portuguese) by Alberto Costa e Silva, "The Early Years of Francisco Féliz de Souza on the Slave Coast".

Souza was a major slave trader and merchant who traded in palm oil, gold and slaves. He migrated from Brazil to what is now the African republic of Benin. He has been called "the greatest slave trader".

Trading slaves from what was then the Dahomey region, Souza was known for his extravagance and was reputed to have had at least 80 children with women in his harem. He continued to market slaves after the trade was abolished in most jurisdictions. He was apparently so trusted by the locals in Dahomey that he was awarded the status of a chieftain. Although a Catholic, he practiced the Vodun religion, and had his own family shrine. He was buried in Dahomey.

== Family and legacy ==
Born in Salvador, Bahia, then the capital of Portuguese America, De Souza is regarded as the "father" of the city of Ouidah. The city has a statue of him, a plaza named after him, and a museum dedicated to the de Souza family.

According to Edna Bay, de Souza was "deeply influential as an intermediary between European and African cultures". Today he is known as a founding patriarch of the Afro-Brazilian communities in Ghana, Togo, Benin and Nigeria. The de Souza family has been very instrumental in fighting for the independence of Togo, Ghana, Nigeria and Benin. Figures like Paul-Emile de Souza, a president of Benin, and Chantal de Souza Boni Yayi, a former first lady of Benin, typify the class.

According to the de Souza family, he was the eighth-generation descendant of Tomé de Sousa (1503–1579), a Portuguese nobleman who was the first governor-general of the Portuguese colony of Brazil from 1549 to 1553. If true, it would make the contemporary de Souzas members of the Portuguese nobility in addition to being an African chieftaincy family. His ethnicity is not known for sure, but he was probably white or light-skinned, something that can be inferred from the few descriptions of him from the time.

Bruce Chatwin's 1980 novel The Viceroy of Ouidah was loosely based on de Souza's life, renaming him "Francisco Manuel da Silva". The book was adapted into the 1987 film Cobra Verde, directed by Werner Herzog and starring Klaus Kinski.

== Sources ==
- Araujo, Ana Lucia (2011). "Forgetting and Remembering the Atlantic Slave Trade: The Legacy of Brazilian Slave Merchant Francisco Félix de Souza" (PDF). In Araujo, Ana Lucia; Candido, Mariana P.; Lovejoy, Paul E. (eds.). Crossing Memories: Slavery and African Diaspora. Africa World Press. pp. 79–103. ISBN 9781592218196.
- Bay, Edna (2008), Asen, Ancestors, and Vodun, Urbana, Illinois: University of Illinois Press, ISBN 978-0-252-03255-4, OCLC 128237066
- Henderson, Graeme (2009). Redemption of a Slave Ship: The James Matthews. Western Australian Museum. ISBN 9781920843991.
- Thomas, Hugh (2006), The Slave Trade (4th ed.), London: Phoenix, ISBN 0-7538-2056-0, OCLC 62133159
- Law, Robin (2004). "De Souza's Ouidah: The Era of the Illegal Slave Trade". Ouidah: The Social History of a West African Slaving Port 1727-1892. Ohio University Press. pp. 155–188. ISBN 9781782049760.
- Law, Robin (2001). "A carreira de Francisco Félix de Souza na África Ocidental (1800-1849)" (PDF). Topoi (in Portuguese): 9–39. doi:10.1590/2237-101x002002001.
