= Agaja =

King of Dahomey from 1718 to 1740

- King of Dahomey; Emperor of Paupau; Greatest of Black Kings
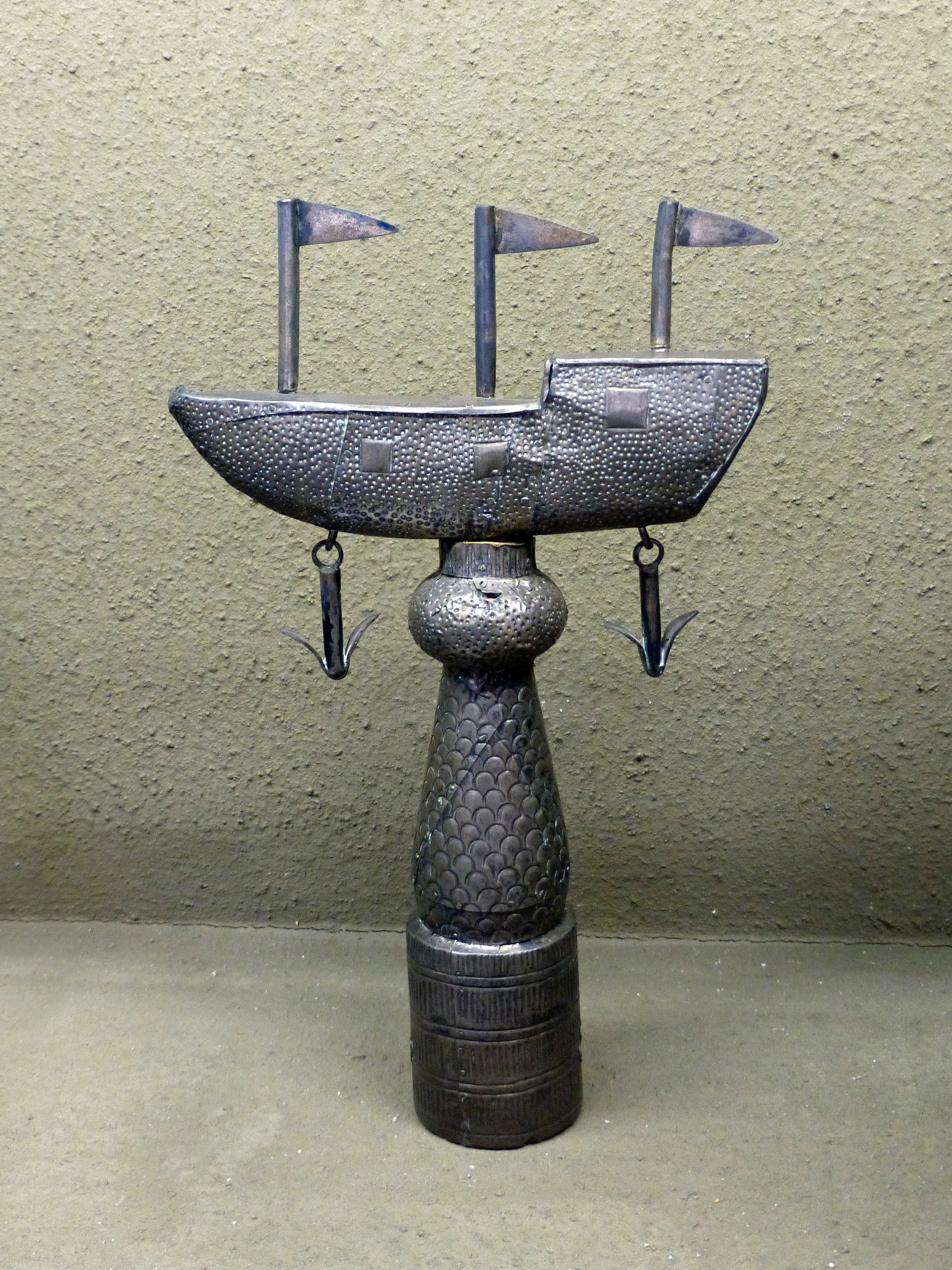
- Emblem of King Agaja
- Reign: 1718–1740
- Predecessor: Akaba or Hangbe
- Successor: Tegbessou
- Born: c. 1673
- Died: 1740; Allada
- House: Aladaxonou
- Father: Houegbadja
- Mother: Nan Adonon

Agaja (also spelled Agadja and also known as Trudo Agaja or Trudo Audati) was a king of the Kingdom of Dahomey, in present-day Benin, who ruled from 1718 until 1740. (Note: Agaja's reign is sometimes dated to be between 1708 and 1740. However, historians Robin Law and Edna Bay analyze multiple sources and conclude that 1718 is the better date for the start of Agaja's reign.) He came to the throne after his brother King Akaba. During his reign, Dahomey expanded significantly and took control of key trade routes for the Atlantic slave trade by conquering Allada (1724) and Whydah (1727). Wars with the powerful Oyo Empire to the east of Dahomey resulted in Agaja accepting tributary status to that empire and providing yearly gifts. After this, Agaja attempted to control the new territory of the kingdom of Dahomey through militarily suppressing revolts and creating administrative and ceremonial systems. Agaja died in 1740 after another war with the Oyo Empire and his son Tegbessou became the new king. Agaja is credited with creating many of the key government structures of Dahomey, including the Yovogan and the Mehu.

The motivations of Agaja and his involvement with the slave trade remain an active dispute among historians of Dahomey with some arguing that he was resistant to the slave trade but agreed to it because of the need to defend his kingdom, while others argue that no such motivation existed and the wars against Allada and Whydah were simply for economic control.

== History ==
Agaja served a crucial role in the early development of the Kingdom of Dahomey. The kingdom had been founded by Agaja's father Houegbadja who ruled from 1645 until 1685 on the Abomey plateau. Although there were some limited military operations outside of the plateau, the kingdom did not significantly expand before the eighteenth century.

=== Rise to power ===
Oral tradition says that Agaja was born around 1673, the second oldest son to Houegbadja. Houegbadja's first two children were the twins Akaba and Hangbe. Agaja was originally called Dosu, a traditional Fon name for the first son born after twins. When Houegbadja died, Akaba became the king and ruled from 1685 until about 1716. Akaba died during a war in the Ouémé River valley and since his oldest son, Agbo Sassa, was a minor, his twin sister Hangbe may have ruled for a brief period of time (alternatively given as either three months or three years). Hangbe supported a faction that wanted Agbo Sassa to be the next king, but Agaja contested this and became the ruler in 1718 after a brief, violent struggle.

=== Conquest of Allada and Whydah ===
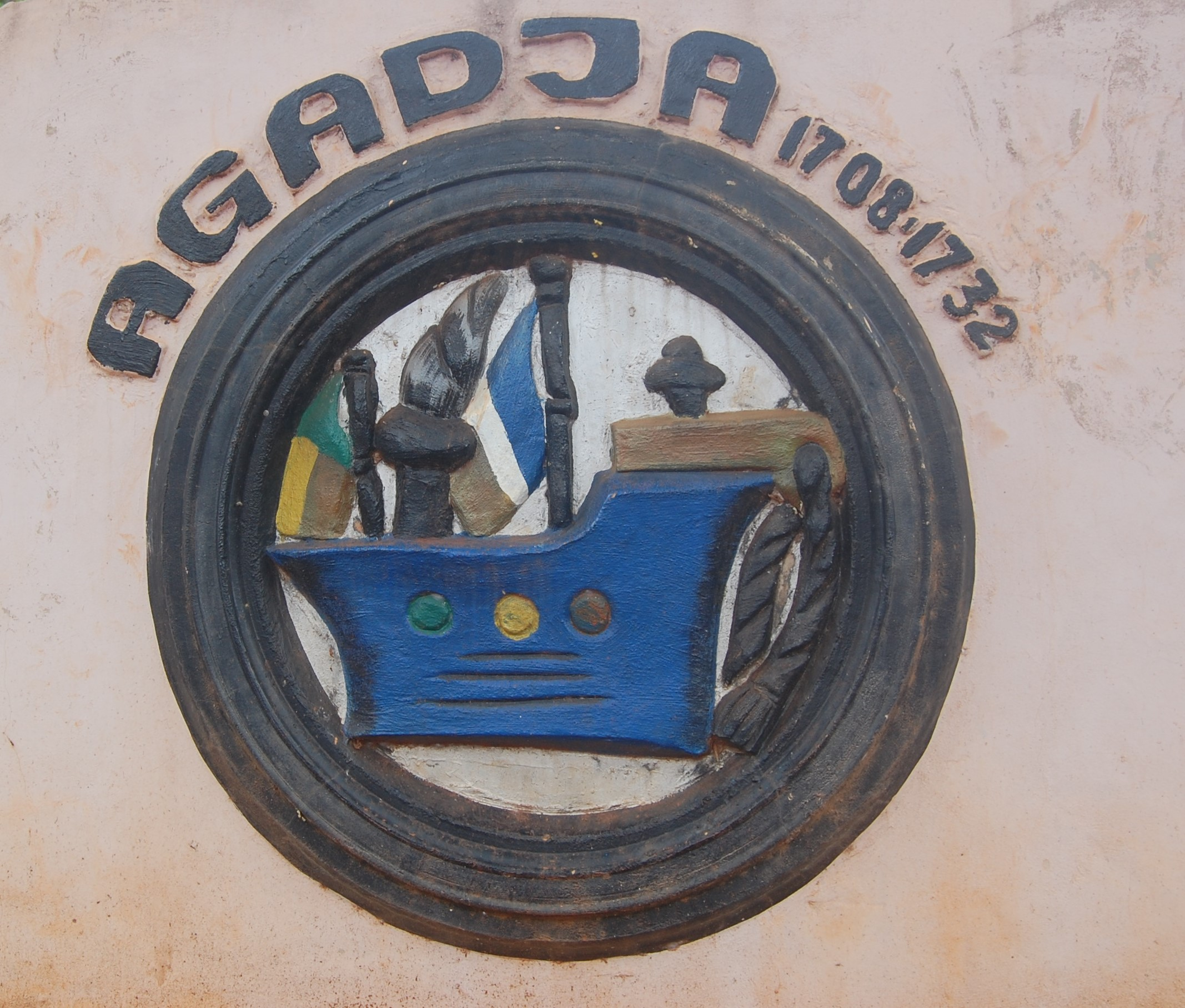
Symbol of Agaja in place Goho.

Agaja led the most important expansions of the kingdom in the 1720s with the conquest of the Kingdom of Allada in 1724 and the Kingdom of Whydah in 1727. Allada and Whydah, both Aja kingdoms, had become important coastal trading centers in the early 1700s, with trade connections to multiple European countries. The two powers made a 1705 agreement where both agreed not to interfere in the trade of the other kingdom. The King of Whydah, Huffon, grew increasingly connected through trade with the British Royal African Company while the king of Allada, Soso, made his ports outposts for the Dutch West India Company. In 1712, a British ship attacked a Dutch ship in the harbor at Allada, triggering economic warfare between Allada and Whydah that lasted until 1720. Upon coming to the throne, Agaja and Soso made an agreement to attack Whydah and remove Huffon from power; however, this plan was halted for unknown reasons.

In 1724, Soso died and a contest for the throne in Allada followed. On March 30, 1724, Agaja's army entered Allada in support of the defeated candidate, named Hussar. After a three-day battle Agaja's army killed the king and set the palace on fire. Rather than place Hussar on the throne, though, Agaja drove him out of the city after establishing his own power. Agaja then turned his forces against the other Aja kingdoms. In April 1724, Agaja conquered the town of Godomey and in 1726 the King of Gomè transferred his allegiance from the King of Whydah to Agaja.

Agaja planned his attack on Whydah in February 1727. He conspired with his daughter, Na Gueze, who was married to Huffon, to pour water on the gunpowder stores in Whydah. He also sent a letter to all of the European traders in the port of Whydah encouraging them to remain neutral in the conflict, in return for which he would provide favorable trade relations at the conclusion of the war. On February 26, 1727, Agaja attacked Whydah and burned the palace, causing the royal family to flee from the city. During the five-day battle, reports say that five thousand people in Whydah were killed and ten to eleven thousand were captured. In April, he burned all of the European factories in the Whydah capital.

In the three years between 1724 and 1727, Agaja had more than doubled the territory of Dahomey, had secured access to the Atlantic coast, and had made Dahomey a prominent power along the Slave Coast.

=== Wars with the Oyo Empire ===
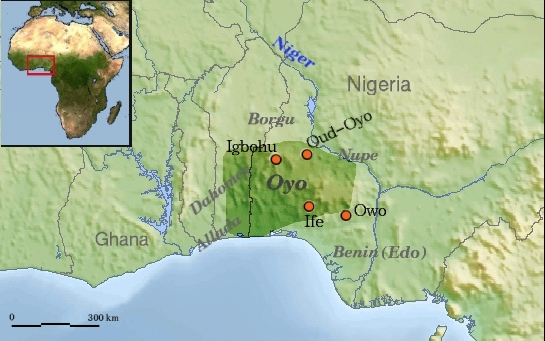
The Oyo Empire and surrounding states around the time of Agaja

The Aja kingdoms had been tributaries to the Oyo Empire since the 1680s. After Agaja had conquered Allada, it appears that he sent a smaller tribute and so on April 14, 1726, the Oyo Empire sent its army against Dahomey. The Oyo conquered Abomey and burned the city while Agaja and his troops escaped into the marshes and hid until the Oyo armies returned home.

Agaja rebuilt Abomey and when he conquered Whydah the next year he provided many gifts to the King of Oyo. Despite these gifts, tributary terms acceptable to Oyo were not agreed to and so the Oyo Empire returned on March 22, 1728. As part of a strategy, Agaja buried his treasure, burned food resources, and made all the residents of Abomey abandon the city. The Oyo army found it difficult to remain in that situation and so they returned to Oyo in April. This strategy was repeated in 1729 and 1730, with Oyo sending increasingly larger armies and Agaja and his troops retreating into the marshes. The 1730 invasion was particularly devastating as the Oyo feigned acceptance of gifts from Agaja but then ambushed Dahomey's forces when they returned to Abomey. With the regular destruction of Abomey, Agaja moved the capital to Allada and ruled from there (his son Tegbessou would later move the capital back to Abomey while appointing a puppet king in Allada).

After the 1730 attack by the Oyo Empire, Agaja's forces were particularly depleted. Huffon and the deposed royal family of Whydah, with support from the British and the French, attempted to reconquer the city. With depleted forces, Agaja created a special unit of women dressed in war armor to assemble at the back of his remaining army to make his forces look larger. The ploy worked as the Whydah forces saw a huge force marching toward the city and fled before any fighting happened. After this attack, Agaja asked the Portuguese leader in the area to negotiate a peace agreement between Dahomey and Oyo. The agreement set the boundaries between Oyo and Dahomey at the Ouémé River and made Dahomey a tributary state of Oyo, a status which would remain until 1832. As a guarantee, Agaja had to send a son, Tegbessou, to Oyo.

=== Centralization ===
For the last ten years of his reign, from 1730 until 1740, Agaja worked on consolidating his kingdom and increasing trade with Europeans.

Having come to terms with the Oyo empire, Agaja sought to militarily destroy other rivals in the region. This started in 1731 with a successful war against the Mahi people to the north of Abomey for supplying the Oyo with food and support during the wars. Attempts by the Portuguese and the Dutch to establish forts in Godomey, which Agaja had conquered in 1724 but whose leader had recently renounced his allegiance to Dahomey, caused a large war in 1732 in which Agaja burned the town and took thousands of people captive. In addition, regular warfare continued between Agaja and the exiled Whydah population under Huffon. In July 1733 Huffon died and a civil war broke out in the exiled community. A defeated prince went to Agaja to ask for assistance and seeing the opportunity, Agaja agreed to support the prince against the leadership of Whydah and allowed the prince to resettle after the war was successful. The other Whydah faction was defeated by Agaja in 1734 with assistance of the French.

Agaja also undertook significant administrative reforms to govern the newly conquered areas. Many of the chiefs and officers in Allada were retained, while Agaja dispatched his trade officers and kept active military control over Whydah. The old chiefs, retained for necessity, often caused problems for Agaja by resisting his rule or even revolting. Agaja also appointed three different trade directors, one to manage relations with each different European power (Britain, France, and Portugal). When the Europeans complained about these directors in 1733, Agaja replaced them with one person, thus creating the important position of Yovogan. The Dutch, in contrast, were held in high contempt by Agaja and he spent much of this period trying to destroy their interests in the region. This led the Dutch to organize a significant army of many tribes to the west of Dahomey which destroyed Agaja's forces in 1737 but did not destroy the kingdom.

Starting in 1730 but becoming formal in 1733 all slaves could only be sold through representatives of the king. This royal monopoly led to some revolts by important chiefs who were not receiving full prices for their goods and Agaja crushed multiple rebellions between 1733 and 1740. The royal monopoly proved unpopular and, following the defeat of Agaja's forces in 1737, he was forced to allow the free trade of slaves through Dahomey.

As part of his efforts against the Dutch, Agaja organized a war against Badagry in 1737. This war, while marginally successful, was possibly considered by the Oyo Empire to be against the terms of the 1730 agreement. Conversely, it is possible that Agaja simply refused to continue paying the tribute to Oyo. Whatever the reason, war between Oyo and Dahomey resumed in 1739 and Agaja repeated his earlier strategy of withdrawing into the wild to wait for the Oyo troops to leave.

=== Contacts with Europeans ===
Agaja was the first king of Dahomey to have significant contact with European traders. Although Dahomey had been known to European traders in the 1600s, largely as a source for slaves, because it was an inland kingdom contact was limited. When Agaja expanded the kingdom, he came into contact with the Dutch, British, French, and Portuguese traders. Agaja opposed the Dutch and largely excluded them from trade along the coast after he had conquered it. However, he created direct officers to manage contacts with the other European powers.

One important contact began in 1726 when Agaja sent Bulfinch Lambe (a British trader captured in the 1724 attack on Godomey) and a Dahomey ambassador known as Adomo Tomo or Captain Tom on a mission to Britain. Lambe was meant to deliver a "Scheme of Trade" to King George I. The "Scheme of Trade" outlined a plan for King George I to work with King Agaja in the creation of a plantation in Dahomey, exporting goods such as sugar, cotton, and indigo; however, Lambe was aware that the English had already abandoned plans to set up a plantation in Dahomey. He left Dahomey with no intention of following through on Agaja's plan. Lambe initially sold Adomo Tomo into slavery in Maryland, but after a few years went back to free Tomo and take him to England. Lambe and Tomo carried a letter claimed to be from Agaja and received an audience with King George II. The letter from Agaja was dismissed as a fraud and Tomo was returned to Dahomey where Agaja appointed him the assistant to the chief of trade with the British.

=== Death ===
Agaja died in Allada a few months after returning following the war with Oyo in 1740. Oral traditions say that Tegbessou, who was the fifth oldest son of Agaja, was told by Agaja earlier that because he had saved Dahomey from the Oyo Empire he was going to be the king rather than any of his older brothers, although that tradition may have been created by Tegbessou to legitimize his rule. Regardless, the result was a contest between him and his brothers upon Agaja's death. In the end, Tegbessou was victorious and became the new king of Dahomey.

== Agaja and the slave trade ==
Agaja's motivations for taking over Allada and Whydah and his involvement in the slave trade have been a topic for debate among historians. (Note: The debate is relevant in the impact it has had on other fields. Karl Polanyi, Walter Rodney, and Marxist historians all used the debate about Agaja's motivations to develop arguments about the slave trade economy.) The debate centers largely around Agaja's conquest of Allada and Whydah and an observed decrease in the slave trade in the area after this conquest. Complicating attempts to discern motivation is that Agaja's administration ended by creating a significant infrastructure for the slave trade and participated actively in it during the last few years of his reign.

The debate over Agaja's motivations goes back to John Atkins' 1735 publication of A Voyage to Guinea, Brazil, and the West Indies. In that book, Atkins argued that Allada and Whydah were known for regular slave raiding on the Abomey plateau and that Agaja's attacks on those kingdoms were primarily to release some of his people who had been captured. A key piece of evidence for Atkins was a letter purported to be from Agaja and carried by Bulfinch Lambe to England in 1731 which expressed the willingness of Agaja to establish agricultural exports to Great Britain as an alternative to the slave trade. The authenticity of this letter is disputed and it was widely used in abolition debates in Great Britain as a letter by a purported indigenous African abolitionist.

Later historians have continued this debate about the role of Agaja in the slave trade, but with the need to account for the fact that in the last years of Agaja's life (and after Atkins' book was published) the Kingdom of Dahomey was a major participant in the Atlantic slave trade.

Robert W. Harms writes that Agaja's participation in the slave trade was a self-perpetuated necessity. Agaja had increasingly made his kingdom more and more dependent on foreign wares that could only be paid for by slaves. He writes:

He noted that by converting his army from bows and arrows to guns, he needed a steady supply of gunpowder from the Europeans. He also described the fine clothing of his wives and the opulence of his royal court, implying that he needed a reliable supply of imported cloth and other luxury goods in order to maintain the court lifestyle. Finally, he noted that, as king of Dahomey, he had an obligation to distribute cowry shells and other common goods periodically among the common people. The cowry shells for the common people, like the silk cloth for the royal wives and the gunpowder for the army, could be obtained only through the slave trade.

Basil Davidson contended that Dahomey was drawn into the slave trade only as a means of self-defense against slave raiding by the Oyo Empire and the kingdoms of Allada and Whydah. He argued that Agaja took over the coastal cities to secure access to European firearms to protect the Fon from slave raiding. He writes:

Dahomey emerged "at the beginning of the seventeenth century, or about 1625, when the Fon people of the country behind the Slave Coast drew together in self-defense against the slave-raiding of their eastern neighbor, the Yoruba of Oyo. No doubt the Fon were interested in defending themselves from coastal raiders too...But the new state of Dahomey could defend itself effectively only if it could lay hold on adequate supplies of firearms and ammunition. And these it could obtain only by trade with Ardra [Allada] and Ouidah [Whydah] -- and, of course, only in exchange for slaves...In the end, Dahomey found their exactions intolerable. They refused to allow Dahomey to sell its captives to the Europeans except through them, and this was the immediate reason why the fourth king of Dahomey, Agaja, waged successful war on them in 1727 and seized their towns."

I.A. Akinjogbin has pushed the argument the farthest arguing that Agaja's primary motivation was to end the slave trade in the region. He writes that although Agaja participated in the slave trade, this was primarily a means of self-defense and that his original motives were to end the slave trade. The Bulfinch Lambe letter plays a prominent role in Akinjogbin's analysis as a declaration of Agaja's willingness to stop the slave trade. Akinjogbin writes:

It immediately becomes clear that Agaja had very little sympathy for the slave trade when he invaded the Aja coast [Allada and Whydah]. His first motive appears to have been to sweep away the traditional political system, which had completely broken down and was no longer capable of providing basic security and justice...The second motive would appear to have been to restrict and eventually stop the slave trade, which had been the cause of the breakdown of the traditional system in Aja, and to substitute other 'legitimate' items of trade between Europe and the new kingdom of Dahomey.

Historian Robin Law, in contrast, argues that there is no clear evidence of motivation by Agaja opposing the slave trade and that the conquests of Allada and Whydah may have been simply done to improve Agaja's access to economic trade. Law contends that the disruption in slave trade that followed the rise of Dahomey was not necessarily related to any efforts on their part to slow the slave trade, but was simply due to the disruption caused by their conquests. Law believes in the authenticity of the Bulfinch Lambe letter, but contends that Atkins misinterprets it. In addition, Law doubts the self-defense motivation highlighted by Davidson and Akinjogbin, writing:

It is true that the kings of Dahomey subsequently claimed credit for having freed the Dahomey area from the threat of invasion by neighbouring states, but there is no suggestion that this was a motive for either the original foundation or the subsequent expansion of the kingdom, or indeed that such invasions were seen (to any greater degree than Dahomey's own wars) as slave raids.

Similarly, David Henige and Marion Johnson question Akinjogbin's argument. While agreeing with the evidence from Akinjogbin that trade did slow after Agaja's rise, they find that the evidence does not support any altruistic or moral opposition to the slave trade as the reason for this. In terms of the Bulfinch Lambe letter, they maintain that its authenticity remains "not proven" but that since Lambe was provided 80 slaves when he was released, it is unlikely that Agaja's motivations were clear. Instead, they argue that the evidence supports Agaja trying to get involved in the slave trade but being unable to do so because of war with the exiled royal family of Whydah and the Oyo Empire. They write:

Agaja's actions, insofar as we know them, suggest a willingness to participate in the external trade—be it slaves, goods, or gold—in a way that suited the perceived needs of Dahomey. At the same time, he was unable to implement this opportunity immediately because of the persistent warfare that threatened the existence of his state. During such a transitional and troubled period, trade inevitably languished. Such a view may not necessarily be correct, but it has the clear advantage of being both plausible and congenial to the available evidence.

Edna Bay assesses the debate by writing:

Though the possibility that an African monarch tried to put an end to the slave trade is obviously attractive in the twentieth century, historians who have closely considered the evidence from Dahomey suggest, as did the eighteenth-century slave traders, that Dahomey's motive was a desire to trade directly with Europe, and that the kingdom was willing to provide the product most desired by European traders, human beings. Akinjogbin's thesis therefore is not likely. However, both Atkin's idea that Dahomey wanted to stop raids on its own people and the argument that the Dahomeans were seeking direct overseas commerce in slaves are conceivable.

== Legacy ==
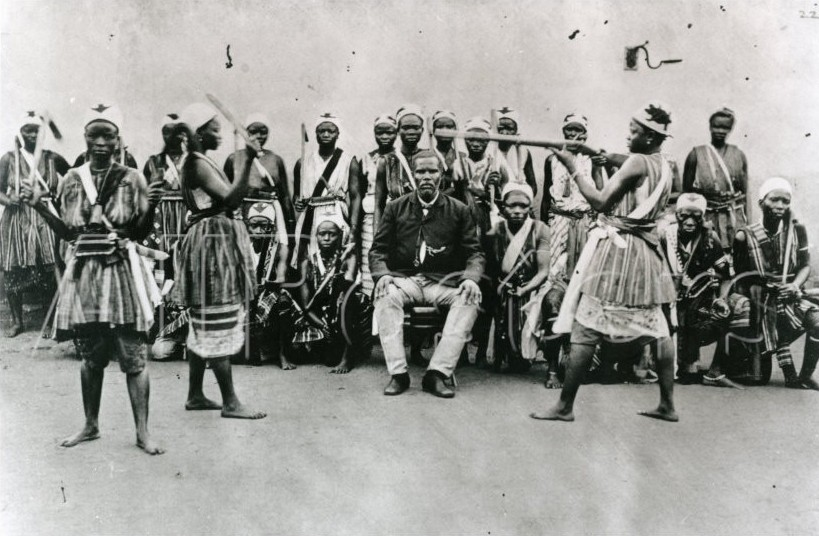
Dahomey Amazons in around 1890

Agaja is credited with introducing many features of the Dahomey state that became defining characteristics for future kings. It is often said that Agaja created the Mehu (a prime minister), the Yovogan (chief to deal with Europeans), and other administrative positions. However, oral traditions sometimes ascribe these developments to other kings. In addition, Agaja is sometimes credited as the king who created the Dahomey Amazons, a military unit composed entirely of women. Multiple histories account that Agaja did have armed female bodyguards in his palace and that he did dress women in armor in order to attack Whydah in 1728; however, historian Stanley Alpern believes that the Amazons were not likely fully organized during his reign.

Agaja also had a large impact on the religion of Dahomey, largely by increasing the centrality of the Annual Customs (xwetanu or huetanu in Fon). Although the Annual Customs already existed and each family had similar celebrations, Agaja transformed this by making the royal Annual Customs the central religious ceremony in the kingdom. Family celebrations could not occur until after the royal Annual Customs had occurred.

Agaja is often considered one of the great kings in Dahomey history and is remembered as the "great warrior". His expansions of Dahomey and connections with European traders led to his depiction in Dahomey art as a European caravel boat.

== See also ==
- History of the Kingdom of Dahomey
- Francisco Félix de Sousa

Regnal titles
Preceded by Hangbe	King of Dahomey; 1718–1740	Succeeded by Tegbessou
