= Annual Customs of Dahomey =

Yearly celebration in the Kingdom of Dahomey

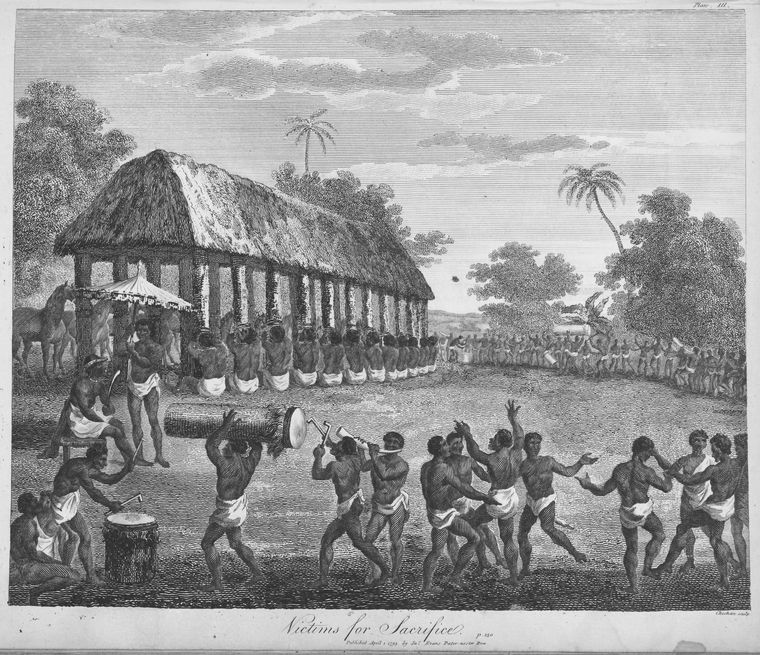
Victims for sacrifice - from The history of Dahomy, an inland Kingdom of Africa, 1793.

The Annual Customs of Dahomey (xwetanu or huetanu in Fon) were the main yearly celebration in the Kingdom of Dahomey, held at the capital, Abomey. These ceremonies were largely started under King Agaja around 1730 and involved significant collection and distribution of gifts and tribute, religious ceremonies involving human sacrifice, military parades, and discussions by dignitaries about the future for the kingdom.

== Origins ==
Tradition amongst the Fon in Western Africa, and among other ethnic groups, often had ceremonies in family lineages where all members of the family would gather for a feast, provide gifts to the eldest member of the family, and discuss issues pertaining to the family. As part of the religious Vodun practiced in the area, gifts and sacrifices to the spirits and ancestors would also be given. King Houegbadja (c. 1645–1685) changed this widespread practice during his reign by making it so that sacrifices or gifts to spirits would have to be done by the king.

King Agaja (1718–1740) further centralized the ceremonies under the king and the royal dynasty. Under Agaja, the Annual customs became the central religious ceremony in the kingdom, wide participation by most of the population was required, all family lineages were expected to provide gifts and tribute (sometimes considered taxes) to the ruler, and aspects of animal and human sacrifice were added to the practice. The traditional family lineage ceremonies were not allowed in the kingdom until after the royal ceremony was completed. After Agaja the ceremony grew larger, longer and more lavish by future kings.

== Practice ==
The Annual Customs involved multiple elaborate components and some aspects may have been added in the 19th century. In general, the celebration involved distribution of gifts, human sacrifice, military parades, and political councils. Its main religious aspect was to offer thanks and gain the approval for ancestors of the royal lineage.

Another function of the Annual Customs was to raise money for the royal family and the kingdom as a whole. Based on the traditional customs of gift-giving to eldest members of lineage lines, the population of the kingdom provided gifts or paid tribute to the king. The king would then display the riches as a sign of the accomplishments of his administration. The wealth was provided and displayed not simply to enrich the kingdom but also to gain the approval of the ancestors. After the display, significant amounts of the gifts were redistributed to the population.

Since Dahomey was a significant military power involved in the slave trade, slaves and human sacrifice became crucial aspects of the ceremony. Captives from war and criminals were killed for the deceased kings of Dahomey. During the ceremony, around 500 prisoners would be sacrificed. As many as 4,000 were reported killed in one of these ceremonies in 1727. Most of the victims were sacrificed through decapitation, a tradition widely used by Dahomean kings, and the literal translation for the Fon name for the ceremony Xwetanu is "yearly head business". In later years this ceremony also included the spilling of human blood from the sacrificed. There was also a significant military parade in the ceremonies that further displayed the military might of the kingdom of Dahomey.

The Annual Customs also included a prominent structure for discussion and debate about public policy in the kingdom. In this respect, scholar John C. Yoder has argued that the customs "served a political function similar to that of parliaments in Western countries", although still far from the open contests in democracies. The Great Council would convene at the annual customs and bring together important leaders from throughout Dahomey to discuss national policy. The Great Council included a large segment of the population and included women. Debate and discussion would be extensive; low ranking-officials could publicly rebuke high-ranking ones. In the end the king would end the debate by declaring consensus.

In addition, when a king died, his successor would have to include a significant ceremony in his honor to finish the funeral rites. Until such sacrifices and ceremonies were performed, it was considered that the new king was not approved by the spirits of the ancestors.

Items associated with the Customs are preserved at the Abomey Historical Museum, in the Royal Palaces of Abomey.

== Schedule ==
By day, according to Yoder.

1. Procession from Cana
2. Private receptions or levées
3. Parade through Great Square, more petitions
4. Historical songs sung by court singers
5. Parade of the king's wealth
6. Distribution of wealth, including slain captives
7. King reviews troops
8. Display of king's wealth
9. More audiences
17. Great Council starts to meet in the mornings
25. Great Council meetings end
26. Troops swear loyalty
27. Mino stage mock battle and slave raid
28. Songs praising the kingdom sung by court singers
29. Gifts given to officials for services
30. Answers given to petitions

Officials largely spent their evenings building coalitions of political support.
