= Hangbe =

Ruler of Dahomey in c. 1716-1718

Queen of Dahomey
- Reign: 1716–1718
- Predecessor: Akaba
- Successor: Agaja
- House: Alladahonu
- Father: Houegbadja

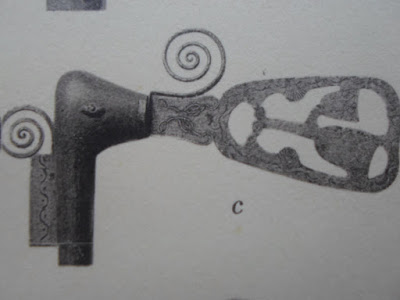
On King Akaba’s scepter (pictured) are carved two bells, which are supposed to symbolize him and his twin sister, Hangbe

Hangbe (or Hangbè, also Ahangbe or Na Hangbe) was a woman who served as the ruler of the Kingdom of Dahomey for a brief period before Agaja came to power in 1718. Oral traditions depict Hangbe variously as a regent or as a ruler in her own right. According to oral tradition, she became ruler upon the sudden death of King Akaba because his oldest son, Agbo Sassa, was not yet of age. The duration of her rule is unclear. She supported Agbo Sassa in a succession struggle against Agaja, who ultimately became king. Hangbe's legacy lives on in oral tradition, but little is known about her rule because it was largely erased from official history. It is possible that her gender and role as a woman in power contributed to her rule being erased from official history.

== Ruler of Dahomey ==
Hangbe was born to Houegbadja as the twin sister of Akaba. The twins had a younger brother named Dosu, who later took the name Agaja, which is the traditional name given to the first son born after twins. Akaba became the King of Dahomey around 1685 and Hangbe became an important part of the royal family as the oldest sister of Akaba.

Oral histories agree generally that Akaba died while engaged in military combat in the Ouémé River valley in 1716, but the histories disagree about the cause of death whether in battle, poisoned, or smallpox. Regardless, between his death and the appointment of Agaja in 1718, oral traditions say that Hangbe was the ruler of Dahomey. In one version, after Akaba's death, Hangbe put on her brother's armor and continued leading the forces in the Ouémé River valley. Between 1716 and 1718, Hangbe continued the warfare started by Akaba in the Ouémé River valley and may have led additional military expeditions. Her rule is generally considered to have lasted either three months or three years.

== Succession struggle ==
In 1718, Hangbe supported the rule of Agbo Sassa, the oldest son of Akaba, to the throne of Dahomey. Her younger brother Dosu (later Agaja) contested this rule and this caused a significant succession struggle between Agbo Sassa and Dosu. Some versions claim that the royal court was displeased with the perceived bacchanalian and decadent lifestyle of Hangbe and so instead chose Agaja. Others contend that the court was afraid of creating a split dynasty, with the children of Hangbe and the children of Akaba having equal right to claim the throne, and so preferred Agaja to clarify the dynastic line of succession. Regardless, the struggle did not last long and Agaja became the King of Dahomey. Oral traditions disagree on what happened afterwards. One version recounts that her only son was put to death to prevent any claims to the throne, while Hangbe, disgusted with the choice of Agaja and the execution of her son, stripped naked in front of the council and washed her genitals in a show of contempt for their decision. Other versions have her son remaining alive but an angry speech by Hangbe directed at the council included a prediction that this would lead to the conquest of Dahomey by Europeans. Other oral traditions connected with her surviving lineage suggests that, while Agbo Sassa fled north to live with the Mahi people, she and her family remained in Abomey and, under King Ghezo in the early 1800s, the house and lineage was provided significant funds to maintain its presence.

== Legacy ==
Hangbe's descendants live to the current day in a compound next to the Royal Palaces of Abomey and have an oral tradition that lists seven descendants acting as head of the Hangbe lineage under the title of Queen Hangbe. In some versions, it is stated that Hangbe was the main person responsible for the creation of the Dahomey Amazons, a military unit composed entirely of women. Most scholars do not consider this likely. Hangbe is not included in any of the court king lists for the Kingdom of Dahomey due to a particularly thorough case of damnatio memoriae.

== See also ==
- Women in warfare (1500–1699)
- List of queens regnant
- History of the Kingdom of Dahomey

Regnal titles
Preceded by Akaba	Queen of Dahomey c.1716-1718	Succeeded by Agaja
