= Catalan myths and legends =

Catalan myths and legends are the traditional myths and legends of the Catalan-speaking world, especially Catalonia itself, passed down for generations as part of that region's popular culture.

== Mythological figures ==
Among the figures of Catalan mythology are:

- Aloja - In Catalan mythology an Aloja, also known as Dona d'aigua, Goja, or Paitida, is a feminine being that lives in places with fresh water. This "water-woman" can turn into water blackbirds.
- Banyoles monster
- Bubota
- Catalan mythology about witches - Catalan tradition distinguished between bruixeria ("witchcraft") based on an explicit compact with the Devil, and fetilleria (deriving from a word related to "fetish", and Old Portuguese feitiço), magic worked through charms and fetishes. The former was considered inherently evil, while the latter might include the working of magical cures. In Catalan popular culture, there are a large number of legends about witches. In the popular imagination, a witch is a woman who, by means of a pact with the Devil, has acquired supernatural power, which she uses for her own benefit and for evil purposes.
- Castanyera
- Cocollona
- Comte Arnau
- Comte Estruch
- Cucafera
- Dip - In Catalan myth, Dip is an evil, black, hairy dog, an emissary of the Devil, who sucks people's blood.
- Dona d'aigua - (See Aloja)
- Donyet
- Dragons
  - Drac (a dragon, generally male)
  - Víbria (specifically female)
- Encantaria
- Follet
- Gambutzí
- Goja - (See Aloja)
- Fada - Hada
- Home del sac (man of the sack)
- Home dels nassos (man of the noses)
- Marraco
- Martinet
- Minairó
- El Moro Musa
- Muladona
- Negret
- Nitus
- Paitida - (See Aloja)
- Papu
- Peix Nicolau - Peje Nicolao
- Pellofa
- Pesanta
- Puigmal
- Rei Carnestoltes
- Tió de Nadal
- The Three Wise Men or Tres Reis Mags d'Orient
  - Page Gregory
  - Page Fumera
- Tombatossals
- Vella Quaresma - She is depicted as an old woman with seven legs, representing the seven weeks of Lent. In one hand she holds a basket of vegetables and in the other a dried cod or herring, a reminder that meat should not be eaten during this time. She is the opposite of Rei Carnestoltes, symbolizing the end of the festivities and the beginning of moderation.
- Víbria

== Generic figures ==
In Catalonia those characters that are invoked to induce fear in children for practical purposes, for example to avoid speaking to strangers or leaving home alone, are called Espantamainades. At the anthropological level, sometimes they are manifestations of the fears of the unknown and inexplicable in nature. Some are local representations related to those figures also existing in other cultures, such as witches, goblins, and the bogeyman. Others are purely local variations, such as Marraco the peasant and the dips.
