= Na Agontimé =

- Born: Dahomey
- Spouse: Agonglo

Na Agontimé (fl. 19th c.) was a queen of the Kingdom of Dahomey during the early 1800s. She was one of the wives of King Agonglo. After a power struggle between Agonglo's sons Adandozan and Ghezo, the latter of whom is likely Agontimé's son, she was sold into slavery in Brazil. While in Brazil, it is thought that she established the Casa das Minas in São Luís, Maranhão under the name Maria Jesuína. The temple became the birthplace of the Tambor de Mina religion.

== Biography ==
Agontimé was a Mahi woman born in the late 1700s in Dahomey (now modern-day Benin). She was one of the wives of Agonglo.

After the death of Agonglo in 1797, there was a power struggle between Agonglo's children, namely Adandozan and Ghezo. During the course of the power struggle, Ghezo had appointed Agontimé to become his Kpojito (or queen-mother, an important post in the Kingdom of Dahomey). Due to her supporting Ghezo to the throne, Adandozan sold Agontimé into slavery.

While sources vary, it is generally thought that she founded the Casa das Minas in São Luís. It is an Afro-Brazilian temple that is the only house of the Dahomean jeje tradition in Maranhão; the others are of Yoruba (nagô) origin in present-day Benin and Nigeria. The temple was the origin of the Tambor de Mina religion, establishing the cult of the ancestors of the royal family (voduns). A throne that was sent by Adandozan to Brazil during this time period is thought to have direct relation to Agontimé. The throne was destroyed during the National Museum of Brazil fire in 2018.

According to some versions of Agontimé's story, Ghezo was able to secure her release from Brazil and bring her back to the kingdom, although evidence of this is not clear.

The French-Brazilian photographer and Babalawo Pierre Verger, together with the Institut Fondamental d'Afrique Noire (IFAN), had undertaken research in 1952 in order to discover more details about Agontimé, but even still, there are still many details that are unknown about her.

== Legacy ==
The story of Agontimé has become a modern story within Afro-Brazilian culture, with her being celebrated in museums, songs, and Carnival blocs. In 2001, Beija-Flor, a samba school based in Nilópolis, north of Rio de Janeiro, created a samba-enredo in homage to Agontimé, titled "A Saga de Agotime, Maria Mineira Naê".

The anthropologist Judith Gleason wrote a novel, Agõtĩme: Her Legend (1970), centered on an account of Agontimé, who offends her husband, who then sells her to slavery in Brazil; she makes a bargain with a vodu (deity), putting her son on the throne of Dahomey and bringing her home.

A biography about her was written by author Jarid Arraes as part of her 2015 cordel collection and book Heroínas Negras Brasileiras em 15 cordéis.

In 2022, a portrait of Agontimé by artist Larissa de Souza, titled Ná Agontimé, was submitted to be displayed during the Enciclopédia Negra exhibition of the Museu de Arte do Rio.
