= Encantaria =

Form of Afro-Amerindian spiritual and religious manifestation

Encantaria is a form of Afro-Amerindian spiritual and religious manifestation, practiced mainly in Piauí, Bahia, Maranhão and Pará. It can be associated with several religions present in these states, such as Pajelança or Cura, Terecô (Mata or Encantaria of Maria Bárbara Soeira), Babaçuê and Tambor de Mina.

Unlike Umbanda, in which the entities are spirits of Indigenous people, Africans, etc., who have passed away and now work individually (usually using fictitious names), in Encantaria, the encantados are not necessarily of Afro-Brazilian origin and have not died, but rather, have become "enchanted," that is, have mysteriously disappeared, become invisible, or transformed into an animal, plant, stone, or even mythological beings from Brazilian folklore such as mermaids, dolphins, and curupiras. In Encantaria, the entities are grouped into families and have first and last names. They can usually tell the story of their time on earth before becoming encantados.

Encantaria can also refer to the places where such entities live.

== Encantaria in Piaui ==
Piauí, due to its proximity to Maranhão, especially Teresina, which is on the border of the two states and very close to the city of Codó, receives a lot of influence from Tambor de Mina and Encantaria Maranhense, in addition to the traditional Umbanda. In Teresina it is possible to find more than 500 terreiros of Afro-Brazilian cults.

The Encantaria Piauiense is strongly linked to popular Catholicism. In Piauí, believers repeat a certain prayerful verse for purification several times. Then, the Pai-de-Santo dances around the guma in the center of a circle formed by all the dancers who rotate from right to left around the master. Songs are sung so that a young man (spirit) takes possession of his apparatus (son or daughter-of-the-saint) and sings his doctrine, dancing in a trance.

=== Main Encantaria Events in Teresina - PI ===
- Washing of the Steps of São Benedito Church: Every year in November, members of various Umbanda, Candomblé, and Tambor de Mina terreiros perform the ritual of washing the steps of São Benedito Church in downtown Teresina. The church was chosen for its beautiful churchyard with a cross and steps, its central location, high visibility, its construction by slave labor, and the fact that São Benedito is the patron saint of Black people. Washing the steps of São Benedito Church in Teresina is usually part of the Black Consciousness Day celebrations.
- Iemanjá Festival in Teresina: Every year in February, several faithful occupy the old pier of the Parnaíba River in downtown Teresina, bringing blue candles, white flowers, scented water and other gifts to please Iemanjá, considered the Mother of Waters (folklore) by Afro-Brazilian cults. The goddess of the waters is also honored on the banks of the Poti River, in the upscale area of Teresina.
- Black Culture Estaiada na Ponte: An event that is part of Teresina's anniversary celebrations and aims to promote black culture and fight for racial equality and against religious intolerance. The event is supported by black culture groups and Umbanda temples from Piauí and Maranhão. The first edition took place in August 2013 and featured the participation of the famous Pai-de-Santo Bita from Barão de Codó (MA).

== Encantaria in Maranhao ==
In the state of Maranhão, the cult of the encantados is a very important part of the Tambor de Mina (being absent only in the Casa das Minas) and the terecô. The Encantaria is present in practically the entire state, having crossed the borders of Maranhão and reaching neighboring states such as Piauí and Pará. Many entities of the Encantaria of the Mina de Maranhão can now be found in tents throughout Brazil. The largest centers of Encantaria are the cities of São Luís, Codó, Caxias, and Cururupu, all in Maranhão, and also Teresina (Piauí) and Belém do Pará.

In the mina drum and the terecô, divinities of diverse origins are worshipped, such as African (Voduns and certain Orixás), Catholic (the one God, the Holy Spirit and the Virgin Mary) and encantados, who are called gentiles (if they are nobles of European origin) or caboclos (of native or non-native origin, such as the "Turks", Moorish kings).

The encantados of Maranhão are grouped into families, have their own names, and tell their stories of their time on Earth, receiving them in a mediumistic trance. They say that being encantado is like living in a frozen world, as they see things happening around them, but no one can see them; they are invisible. The places where they find themselves encantados refer to various things and places in the state, such as the forests of Codó, Boqueirão, Pedra de Itacolomi, islands, and the famous Lençóis Beach, where the reign of King Dom Sebastião is located. In Maranhão, a caboclo is not necessarily an indigenous entity.

=== Pajelança ===
In Maranhão, since the mid-19th century, the term Pajelança (or Cura, not to be confused with caboclo pajelança) has been used to describe a medical-religious system, with rituals performed by Black religious specialists aimed at "healing spells," in which people worship and enter into trances primarily with non-African entities—nobles, such as King Sebastião, princesses, caboclos, and others, sometimes enchanted into animals (birds, fish, reptiles, and mammals). In the Maranhão context, although Cura (Black or terreiro pajelança) is often associated with Indigenous culture, it is closer to the Tambor de Mina.

In the 19th century, with medicine still underdeveloped, pajés were sought out by the population because they knew home remedies, as well as how to cure illnesses and break spells. With the organization of medical services, pajelança was combated by the government. The case of Amélia Rosa, a freed Black woman who was called the "queen of pajelança," became notorious. The first Black pajé to have her name widely publicized was arrested in 1876 while performing rituals in her home and sentenced to 10 years in prison after being prosecuted for abusing a slave who claimed to have sought her out due to health problems.

Although Pajelança rituals are absent from Casa das Minas and Casa de Nagô, the oldest terreiros in the state, many healers and pajés opened Mina terreiros as early as the 19th century, and especially in the 1930s, to escape police persecution stemming from accusations of quackery. In the 1960s, they also began establishing connections with Umbanda. The pajé can also be presented as an "ave de encantado" (bird of the enchanted), just as the term "horse" is used for mediums.

In some terreiros, both Mina and Healing or Pajelança rituals are performed in a festive public ritual called the Brinquedo de Cura (healing toy). In the ritual, the pajé uses a macaw plume in his hand and a maraca, which he plays during the ceremonies, along with singing and dancing, giving passage to a large number of entities with a plurality of trances (which also differs from what occurs in the Tambor de Mina). In Cururupu, these Healing rituals are known as Tambor de Curador.

It is said that the encantados who participate in both "navigate both waters", with Mina being classified as a "linha de água salgada" (salt water line) and Cura/Pajelança as a "linha de água doce" (fresh water line). In Codó, in the terecô, the encantados would belong to the "linha da mata" (woods' line).

=== Families of Encantaria ===
- Lençol Family: Encantada na Praia dos Lençóis, made up of kings, queens, princes, princesses and other nobles and gentlemen, such as Dom Sebastião, Dom Luís, Dom Manoel, Queen Bárbara Soeira;
- Codó Family: Family that came along the sea until reaching the forests of Codó, made up of black people, wild caboclos and cowboys, and whose leader is Légua-Boji;
- Family of Turkey: Added to the Family of Lençol, it is made up of nobles of Turkish origin, whose most famous encantada is Dona Mariana.
- Bandeira Family: Composed of warriors, bandeirantes, hunters and fishermen, led by João da Mata, King of Bandeira.
- Da Gama Family: Composed of proud nobles and noblemen, such as Dom Miguel da Gama, Queen Anadiê, Baliza da Gama, Boço Sanatiel;
- Family from Bahia: Composed of party-going caboclos who resemble the exus and pombagiras;
- Surrupira Family: Composed of wild indigenous people and sorcerers, like Vó Surrupira, Índio Velho.

=== Codó - Capital of Witchcraft ===
A city in Maranhão, best accessible through Teresina in Piauí. The city's reputation as the Capital of Witchcraft or black magic arose because, before the first terreiros (spiritual centers), Codó had renowned sorcerers who accepted payment for revenge work, as well as renowned prayer and herbal healers who practiced healing. Later, with the emergence of terreiros, it became a pilgrimage site for politicians seeking support for their positions and governments. Soon, the number of terreiros grew significantly, further contributing to the city's reputation. In Codó, the practice of these spiritual cults is called Encantaria de Maria Bárbara Soeira, or Terecô, as it is also better known in Teresina and other cities in Piauí. The best-known entities in the Codó region are those of the family of Seu Légua Boji Buá da Trindade.

Opening Singing Point in Encantaria

I will call for my people to work

Maria Bárbara Soeira is already walking along the seashore

She comes along the sea... She comes along the sea

Maria Bárbara Soeira is already walking along the seashore

== Paraense Encantaria ==
Belief in encantados is widespread throughout much of the Amazon region. The encantados is a central element of caboclo pajelança, which had a strong Amerindian influence and, later, an African influence, giving rise to the babassu tree. On the island of Marajó, encantados such as the boto, the great snake, Iara, Vitória Régia, mermaids, and matintas are closely linked to natural elements such as the sea, bays, rivers, holes, straits, lakes, streams, igapós, and flooded fields, representing the dwellings of the encantados.

At the end of the 19th century, the Tambor de Mina arrived in Pará, coming from Maranhão, with the founding of terreiros such as the Terreiro de Tambor de Mina Dois Irmãos.

As an example of Encantaria in Pará, there is the cult of the Three Turkish Princesses: Princess Mariana, Princess Erondina, Princess Jarina, of Moorish origin and who were said to have been "encatado" on the island of Lençóis.

== King Sebastião and the Touro Encantado dos Lençóis ==
The Touro Encantado da Praia dos Lençóis is a large black bull with a bright star on its forehead that mysteriously appears on Friday nights. It is said that Dom Sebastião appears on the beach in the form of a black bull. If someone can reach the star and wound the bull, the kingdom will be disenchanted, the city of São Luís will submerge, and an enchanted city with the king's treasures will appear.

Some say that King Sebastião usually appears mainly in June, during the Bumba-meu-boi festivals, and in August, during the anniversary of the Battle of Alcácer-Quibir. They also say that nowadays King Sebastião no longer appears because "Lençóis Beach is very visited and already has many residents."

It is said that the sand dunes of Lençóis Beach bear similarities to the Alcácer-Quibir field, where King Sebastião disappeared. Lençóis is considered an enchanted beach, serving as the home of King Sebastião. His kingdom is hidden at the bottom of the sea, near the beach. The king lives in his underwater palace, and his ship never finds its way to Portugal.

It is also said that everything in Lençóis belongs to King Sebastião, and that no one can appropriate what is his. Anyone who attempts to take anything belonging to the beach must return it as soon as possible, or risk their own life and the lives of all their companions. The boat could sink and take everyone to Dom Sebastião's home, identified as the Kingdom or Palace of Queluz (although this was only built in the 18th century, in the city of Sintra, long after his time).

In one of the songs of Tambor de Mina, King Touro is remembered: "King Sebastião, military warrior. King Sebastião, military warrior. And whoever disenchants the sheet, brings down Maranhão."

In this cult, it is said that, on Lençóis beach, lives an entire family of encantados, made up entirely of kings and noblemen, such as the Family of Turkey, led by the Moorish king Dom João de Barabaia, who fought against the Christians. It is to this family that the Bela Turca, Cabocla Mariana, belongs, who comes into the world not only as a Turk, but also as a sailor, romani, or indigenous.

The arrival of King Dom Sebastião in the body of a priest is very rare, some say it occurs every seven years.

== Francelino de Shapanan ==
Francelino Vasconcelos Ferreira was the greatest exponent of Encantaria de Mina. Born on Marajó Island (Pará), he was a great pioneer, bringing Tambor de Mina and Encantaria from the Mid-North to the Southeast and South of Brazil, more precisely to São Paulo, where he founded the Casa das Minas de Thoya Jarina. Today, there are several Encantaria de Mina houses in the state, mainly affiliated with the Casa de Thoya Jarina.

== Literature ==
- J. Reginaldo Prandi, André Ricardo de Souza: Encantaria Brasileira: O Livro dos Mestres, Caboclos E Encantados (Google Books), Pallas Editora, 2001
