= Mãe Andresa =

Andresa Maria de Sousa Ramos, known as Mother Andresa (Caxias, Maranhão, November 10, 1853 - April 20, 1954), was a great priestess (vodunsi) of the Tambor de Mina, a cult of voduns in Maranhão.

Considered the last direct lineage princess of the Fon to be in her region of Brazil, her African religious names given by the voduns were Ronçoiama and Rotopameraçulem (these names were given after the barco, or initiation ceremony). Mother (or Mãe, in Portuguese) Andresa coordinated the Casas das Minas, the most important temple of Tambor de Mina in Maranhão, between 1914 and 1954. She died at 100 years of age.

== Biography ==
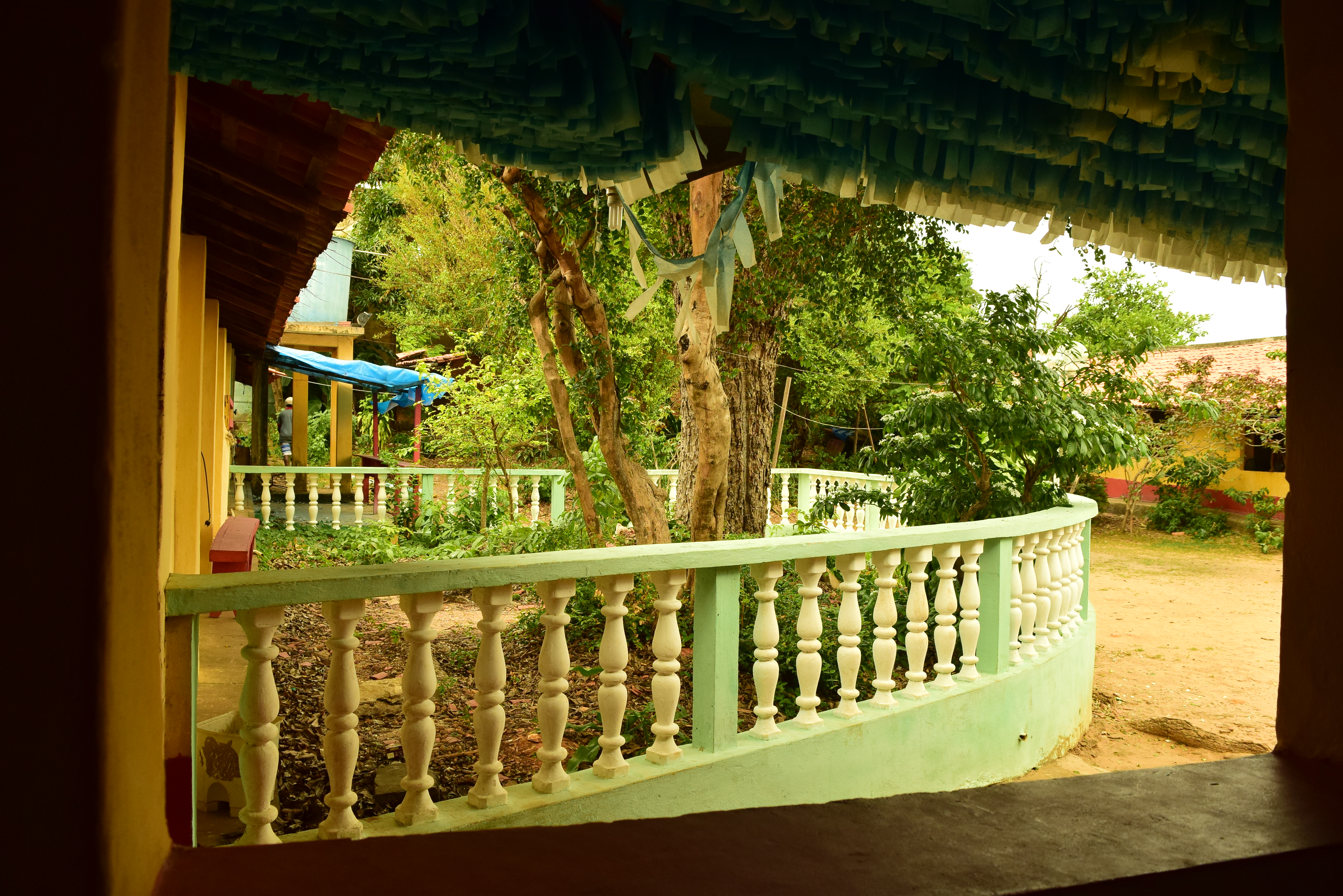
Cajazeira, centenary fruit tree in the Casa das Minas

A descendant of slaves, Mother Andresa was born in Caxias. While still young, she came to São Luís, seeking health treatment. She subsequently went into a trance with the vodum Tói Poliboji (a deity of the Tambor de Mina) at the age of seven or eight. She completed her initiation on a barco of 12 vodunsis hunjaís (the "complete daughters", priestesses who receive in addition to a vodum, a tobossi), probably before 1900, when the temple was headed by Mother Luisa, the second head of the Casa das Minas.

In 1914, she succeeded Mãe Hosana (who had succeeded Mãe Luisa), when she was about 60 years old, and devoted herself entirely to the house. She never married, and would have worked selling food in her youth to support herself.

She was friends with several ancient priestesses of São Luís, having had respectful relations with other ancient terreiros. Known for her generosity, she was much sought after by people from various cities of Maranhão, even in case of illness, as there was a garden with medicinal plants in the temple. Several friends sent groceries to the Casa das Minas, and Mother Andressa ordered her followers to distribute the leftover food so that it did not spoil.

She had about a hundred godchildren, and she was said to love children very much. She raised Maneco, chief player of the House; Dona Amância, head of the House between 1972 and 1976; and Dona Deni, chief between 1997 and 2015. She did not prepare other barcos (initiation ceremonies) for vodunsis hunjaís.

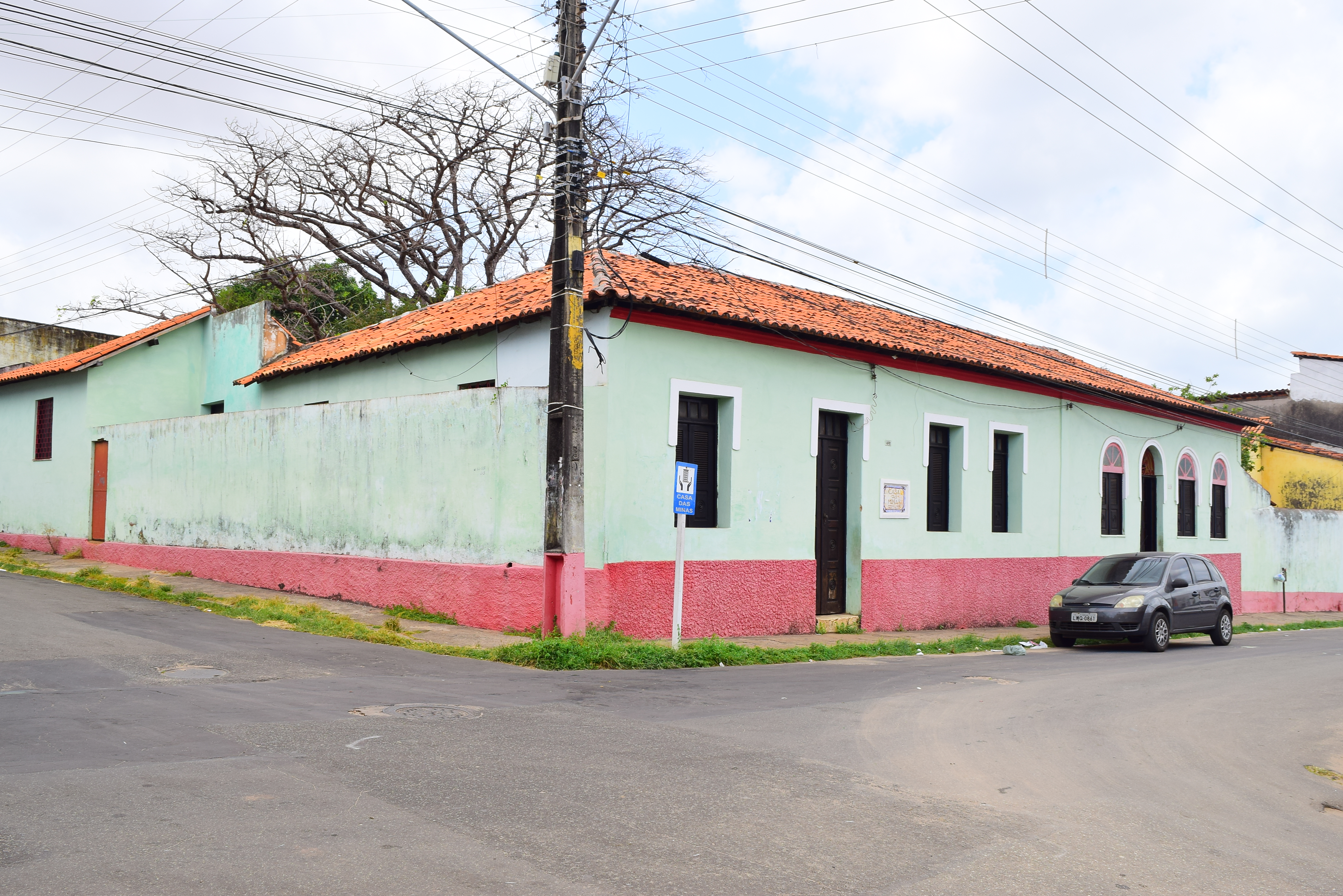
Casa das Minas

While heading the temple, she had to sell jewelry to pay taxes during World War II. In the Estado Novo, there were persecutions of the terreiros in São Luís and attempts to transfer them to the outskirts of the city. However, Governor Paulo Ramos ultimately authorized the Casa das Minas and the Casa de Nagô to remain because they were very old.

For the last 20 years of her life, she was visited by several Brazilian and foreign journalists and researchers, who interviewed her and she provided information about the worship and the history of the temple.

At the end of her life she could no longer walk, although she was still lucid. In 1953, President Café Filho was in São Luís and visited Casa das Minas.

She died on April 20, 1954, on a Tuesday after Easter, after directing the House for four decades, and there was a year's mourning in the temple.
