= Comte Arnau =

In Catalan mythology, Comte Arnau (Count Arnau) is a legendary nobleman from Ripollès who, for his rapacious cruelty and lechery, is condemned to ride an undead horse for eternity while his flesh is devoured by flames. He is the subject of a classic traditional Catalan ballad. The legend has its origins in a popular song of the sixteenth century.

== Legend ==
The legend of Count Arnau is the quintessential myth of medieval Catalonia. It is based on a popular song that has survived the passage of time. According to tradition, many centuries ago, a certain Count Arnau committed two sins: to succumb to the pleasures of the flesh with an abbess and not paying his vassals for some work they had done for him. The consequence was a punishment that apparently still goes on: to ride eternally on a black horse, accompanied by a group of demonic dogs.

== Comte Mal ==
The Comte Mal (Bad count) is the Mallorcan adaptation of the legendary and mythical Comte Arnau of Catalonia, who was condemned to wander for all eternity as a soul in sorrow on a black horse, with flames getting out through his mouth and eyes, in order to redeem his misdeeds of relations with a nun and not paying promised debts. This evil and legendary character in Mallorca overlaps with a real one: Ramon Safortesa Pacs-Fuster de Vilallonga i Nét, second Count of Formiguera (1627–1694), lord of the old knighthoods of Hero, Santa Margalida, Alcudiola, Maria, Puigblanc, Castellet i Tanca and the Alqueria de Galatzó in Calvià. At the age of 12, the Count of Formiguera inherited from his father two grave lawsuits; one, the entitlement to collect taxes based on royal concessions in favour of the Count on the communal lands of Santa Margalida; and, second, the right to exercise the civil and criminal jurisdiction on the inhabitants of their knighthoods, most of them in the village of Santa Margalida. In short, the attempt to perpetuate a feudal regime in favour of the Count was the source of abuse and violent episodes, which led the popular imagination to relate him with the legend of Count Arnau, known in Mallorca since the Middle Ages through a popular song.

The Comte Mal lost his disputes with the people of Santa Margalida, where he was banished, which did not hinder him from reaching a significant position in the Mallorca of his time. Following the thread of the legend, his appearances on a black horse surrounded by flames, are reported in the mount Galatzó, one of his properties. In the palace Can Formiguera, his house in Palma next to the cathedral in La Portella street, it is said that the Count Mal built the tower characterizing the building, to watch his beloved, a nun of the convent of the Clares. Legend and reality intermingled, thanks to the nineteenth century literature and to an oral tradition, have made of the Comte Mal one of the best-known myths of popular culture in Mallorca.

== History of the song ==
Count Amau is a legendary figure in Catalan folklore who is traditionally associated with the castle of Mataplana in the Ripollès region. The legend, which is closely connected to the folk ballad Cançó del Comte Armau ("Song of the Count Arnau), is considered one of the most distinctive and widely discussed myths in Catalan cultural tradition. Although the character may contain some historical references, Count Arnau is primarily regarded as a mythological figure. The legend has been the subject of numerous literary reinterpretations and remains an important element of Catalan folklore alongside other traditional supernatural figures and legends.

The song is connected to a broader popular tradition surrounding the legend of Count Arnau, which has attracted the attention of scholars and writers across the history of modern Catalan literature. The relationship between the myth, the song, and the folk tradition remains a subject of discussion among researchers. The traditional folk song and myth of Count Arnau were first collected in the mid-nineteenth century, after which scholarly interest contributed to the development of an associated body of legend and documented history. Manuel Milà i Fontanals published the song for the first time in Observations on Popular Poetry (1853), and later in the collection Romancerillo Catalán (1882). According to Josep Pla, writing in Tour of Catalonia (1971), the publication by Milà i Fontanals brought the song widespread recognition, and the myth generated significant literary and musical activity in subsequent years. The range of Catalan writers across different literary movements who have engaged with the "Song of Count Arnau" reflects the song's sustained presence in Catalan cultural life.

The first version of the song collection of Count Arnau dates from 1843 and was collected from a family based in Barcelona Pyrenees as a result of the collection effort conducted by Marian Aguilo who then gave it to Paul and Piferrer Milan and this Fontanals great characters on a tour of the Renaissance: As explained by Thomas and Careers Artau in the preface to the most comprehensive study done on the song and the myth of Count Arnau, Romeo Figueras (The Myth of "Count Arnau" in the song popular, legendary tradition and literature (1948): "The first version of the song Count Arnau dates from 1843: the Pyrenean recogió of a family based in Barcelona Mariano Aguilar, quien the Radio Pablo Piferrer and extended Manuel Milan and Fontanals". As today, the Eaglet documents kept by the Work of Popular Songs of Catalonia, the song probably was recited by John Aguilo Monbardó "Was the first to put some of the Song of the Count Arnau before conexerla in 1844 in Milan and in Piferrer (according crech) " and as seen in the work of the File Inventory Work of Popular Songs of Catalonia (1993) by Josep Massot i Muntaner. Romeu Figueras mention of this first version as "Origin: Barcelona (Pyrenean a family). COLLECTOR: Mariano Aguilar. Towards 1843. As Thomas says in the foreword to the book Racing Romeo and Lawrence shows us Meadows (The myth of the folk tradition (1988), born this way "line and erudite scholar" on the song Count Arnau will have its culmination Rossend the work of Serra and Josep Romeu Figueras and Labrador

== Links ==
- Comte Mal
- Comte Arnau
