= Patge Gregori =

Patge Gregori (Catalan pronunciation: [ˈpadʒə ɣɾəˈɣɔɾi], in English "Page Gregory") is, in Catalan tradition, the most powerful page to the Three Magi or Three Kings who bring gifts to the children on the eve of the Feast of the Epiphany (the night of 5/6 January). Three Kings parades are held in many places in Spain at Epiphany. Gregori and other pages including Estel and Omar are a particular feature of the Three Kings parades in Barcelona. Gregori is "known for his long, mirrored moustache". He has big eyes (the Catalan expression for this, ulls com taronges, literally means "eyes like oranges"), and ears that can hear everything for miles around. This lets him know whether children have been good or bad, and whether the Kings should bring them gifts (for the good children) or a lump of coal (for the bad ones).

In other locations, there are other pages that do the same work.
