= Marraco =

Catalonian mythological creature

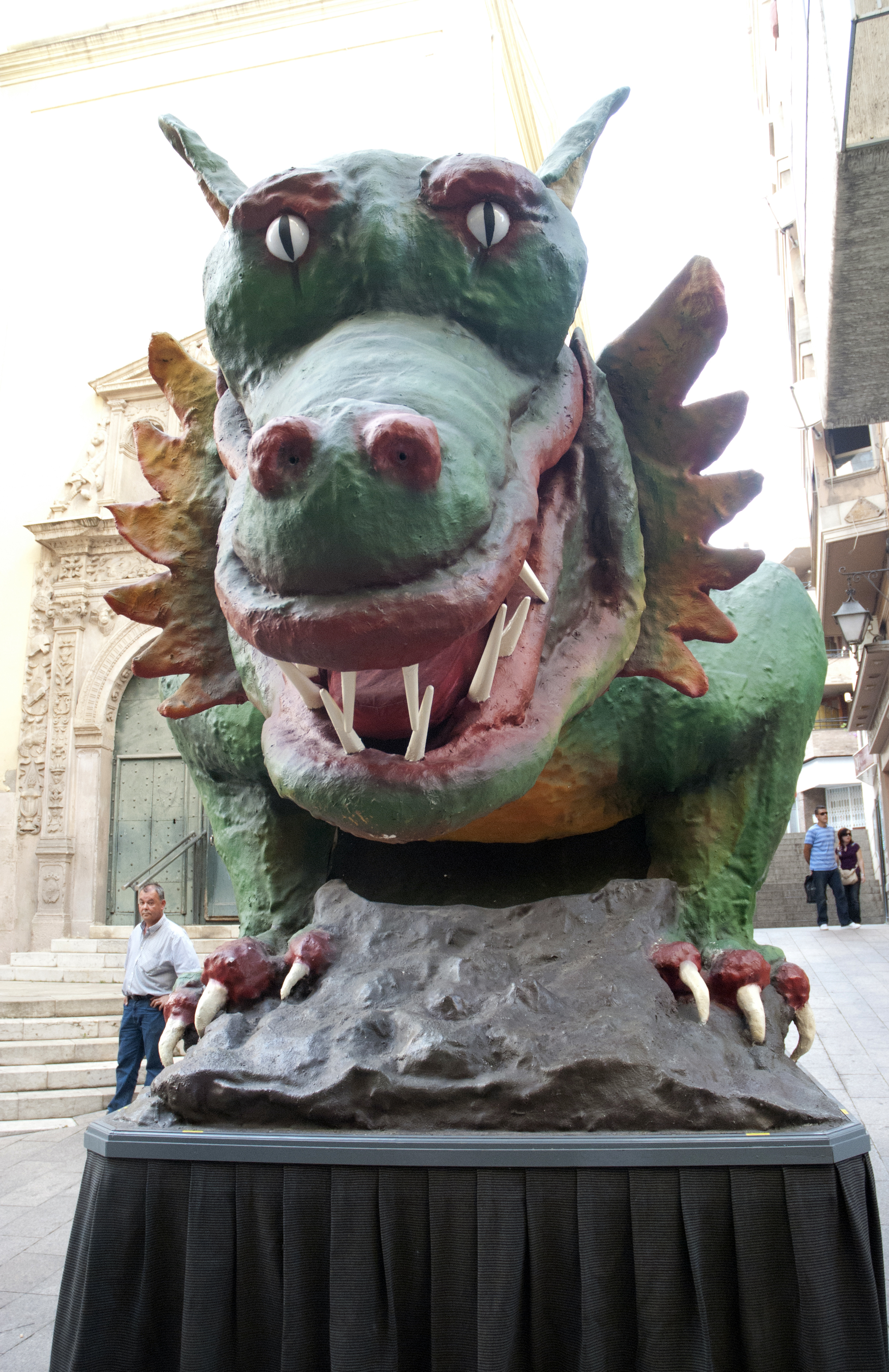
The Marraco of Lleida

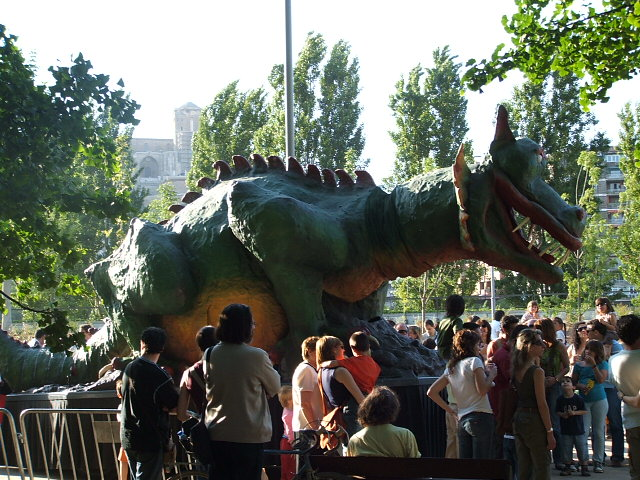
The Marraco, side view

The Marraco (Catalan: Lo Marraco, Catalan pronunciation: [məˈraku]) is a dragon or frightening creature in Catalan myth in the city of Lleida. It possessed a mouth wide enough to swallow a human whole according to tales told to frighten children.

== Etymology ==
There has been made a claim that the term marraco is a borrowing from the Basque word meaning 'dragon', but no linguistic sources have been cited.

The Catalan word marraco (regional variant of marraix) also denotes a type of shark, (Note: Marraco collected in Cambrils as the variant name of marraix, which in modern usage refers specifically to Lamna nasus, the porbeagle shark.) and the corresponding Basque word marraxo meaning 'shark' appears to be borrowed from the Spanish marrajo, according to a linguistic authority. (Note: R. L. Trask in his book "fails to identify borrowings as such" in several cases, and marraxo is one of the "blatant loanwords" from the Spanish that the reviewer (José Ignacio Hualde) noticed.)

Catalan marraco, marranxo, etc., is cognate with Castilian marrajo and Portuguese marraxo. The marraxo spelling is also attested in the writings of the Andalusian priest Pedro de Valderrama (1550–1611), where he comments that the marraxo is one among other "monstrous fish" in the sea, such as the whale, seal, dragon. (Note: As a side-note, Valderrama also opines that the sea-horse may be the identity of the Biblical leviathan.)

The Catalan word marraco also held the meaning of a 'large bull' (Spanish: morlaco) according to one gloss, and Balearic Catalan (Mallorcan) marraco meant 'shy/wild' (Spanish: huraño) by transference from the meaning of a 'boar'. (Note: The 'shy' meaning is commented as being a reference to the beast's cleverness in hiding, even when being hunted with the aid of hounds, etc.) Attempts have been made to etymologically connect these cognates (Note: Or group of related words, which also includes verrac 'boar' which most approximates Latin verres; and reconstructed Spanish *marraco 'pig (?)', conjectured from the E. Andalusian diminutive marraquillo 'young pig'.) to Spanish morrano meaning 'pig/swine'. (Note: Though the term morrano was also used as an invective against newly converted Jews and Muslims.) However, these etymological inquiries do not directly remark on marraco in the sense of a fantastical beast.

== History ==
=== Ancient origins? ===
The dragon has been used as a totem creature in the region of Lleida since the 5th century BC. The ancient Ilergetes people who lived in the region regarded their chieftains to have descended from the marraco, their dragon deity, according to one source.

The source which makes this ancient origins claim also describes the marraco as "a wingless green monster with sharp fangs and a twisted snout, spitting fire from its jaws", writing as if such lore existed since antiquity. However, this is contradicted by a different authority, which notes that it was the advent of the marraco prop built in 1907 for the parade which "gave shape and color to this imaginary creature". The green dragon prop set on wheels (cf. photographs above or illustration) has been rigged with the ability to emit smoke from its nostrils, but was not equipped with the ability to simulate fire-breathing.

=== Middle Ages to Post-Medieval ===
Since the Middle Ages, giant effigies called gegants (sing. Catalan: gegant; Spanish: gigante, aka gigantón) in likeness of giants, dwarfs, or monstrous creatures, have toured the streets as part of the Corpus Christi processions in cities across Catalonia.

The Tarasca or Mulassa (Barcelona, Tarragona, Reus, Valls), the Cucafera of Tortosa, the Drac (dragon) of Vilafranca del Penedès named alongside the Marraco of Lleida as examples of monster effigies paraded in Catalonia during the feast.

One recorded post-medieval precursor of "Lo Marraco de Lleida" was the drac or dragon figure used by the city during the procession of the Assumption of Mary for the year in 1551. (Note: There is a painting of it by the painter Joan Giménez (1912–2003).) There is also record of a "drach" which was ordered to be built in 1671 by the General Council to help out in the procession, and this has also been characterized by an antecedent to the Marraco.

In Lleidan lore, the Marraco was long employed by adults as one of "scare children" beings (espantacriatures) frightening mishaving children into obedience. It is described as having a giant mouth capable of swallowing children whole.

=== 20th century ===
The first bona fide "Lo Marraco de Lleida" effigy for processions was crafted in 1907, and several incarnations of it has appeared intermittently for various major festivals over the years since then. Besides the Corpus Christi, the observation of the feast day of St. Anastasi de Lleida (11 May) is another typical day when the Marraco is brought out. It made an appearance on Saint George's Day in 2020.

This first version was on active duty regularly for consecutive years from 1907 to 1912, then made a final appearance in 1915. It was set on wheels, that is to say, mounted on a hearse-cart. The original plaster coating over the wooden framework was destroyed by thunderstorm and had to be hastily replaced with parchment paper before the presentation prior to the city's festa major, for Sant Anastasi's feast on 11 May. (Note: One source mentions its destruction in 1911, but is too vague to ascertain whether the thunderstorm incident was meant or not.) The first Marraco was also engineered so that it could pretend to gobble up children from its large mouth and eject them out the tail end (rather like the Gargantúa at Bilbao's main celebration).

After a period of hiatus, a replacement was constructed in 1941, (Note: Built by the Barcelona workshop of A. Domènech, a craftsman specializing in festive floats.) but the dragon, which was plaster-cast on wire body mounted on a truck chassis was so heavy and unwieldy that it needed a large number of men pushing it to propel it, so that it fell into disuse.

In 1957, a renewed Marraco was commissioned by the City Council of Lleida, designed by architect Lluís Domènech Torres (1911–1992). (Note: Lluís Domènech Torres being the father of Lluís Domènech i Girbau (b. 1940).) This version was not just placed on an automobile chassis but was motorized (though this meant that the feature of gobbling up children had to be sacrificed). The dragon was now driven through the streets by the driver, and two other men rode on it to operate its body so that it could swing its neck and move its head and jaws. The eyes were made to flash, and a horrifying scream came out of it (which were sound recordings on magnetic tape, amplified through a loudspeaker), and fumes were emitted from its nostrils. But it lacked the sort of spectacular pyrotechnics (fire-spitting) equipped on other parade dragons of Catalonia, and its enormous size serves to impress the crowd instead.

The current Marraco was rebuilt in 1993 based on the 1957 design; the old body made of plaster, wire mesh, and wood was replaced with a replica using fiberglass (Joan Miró is credited with this improvement though he died in 1983). This dragon also sits wheels and driven through the streets like a vehicle. Its dimensions are 8.5 metres (28 ft) long, 2.9 metres (9.5 ft) wide, 3.75 metres (12.3 ft) tall, according to figures posted by the Municipal Council.
