= Nitus =

Catalan mythological creatures

In Catalan mythology, Nitus are small matter, impossible to describe by their smallness, which fall into a person's ear and go to the brain. They do not kill, but are said to feed like maggots on the memory and create tiredness and forgetfulness.
