= Puigmal (mythology) =

Mythological figure of Catalan culture

In Catalan mythology, a Puigmal is considered the protector of trees and animals, who defends against attacks on humans. He is said to inhabit the mountains overlooking the valley of Ribes (Ripollès).
