= Judith Gleason =

American anthropologist, Africanist and writer (1929–2012)

- Born: 1929; Pasadena, California, U.S.
- Died: 2012 (aged 82–83)
- Education: Radcliffe College (BA); Columbia University (PhD)
- Occupations: Anthropologist, Africanist, and writer
- Children: 5

Judith Illsley Gleason (1929–2012) was an American anthropologist, Africanist, and writer. She published a large number of books dedicated to the Orishas and Yoruba religions more broadly, both in West Africa and in Latin America and the Caribbean. She conducted anthropologic studies in places such as Brazil, Haiti, Mexico, and West Africa.

== Biography ==
Gleason was born in 1929 in Pasadena, California, United States. She graduated with a bachelor's degree at Radcliffe College, later earning her doctorate in Comparative Literature from Columbia University. She taught at Sarah Lawrence College. She also worked as a consultant for schools and organizations that were starting their African humanities and literature programs.

In 1970, she wrote a novel, Agõtĩme: Her Legend, centered on an account of Na Agontimé, who offends her husband, who then sells her into slavery in Brazil; she makes a bargain with a vodu (deity), putting her son on the throne of Dahomey and bringing her home. Her 1971 book Orisha: the gods of Yorubaland was included in an exhibition for Trinidad and Tobago's Emancipation celebrations at the National Library and Information System (NALIS) in Port of Spain in 2019.

Gleason died in 2012. She had 5 children.

== Bibliography (selection) ==
=== Books ===
- This Africa: Novels by West Africans in English and French (1965)
- Agõtĩme: Her Legend (with Carybé; 1970)
- Orisha: the gods of Yorubaland (1971)
- A recitation of Ifa, oracle of the Yoruba (with Awotunde Aworinde and John Olaniyi Ogundipe; 1973)
- Santería, Bronx (1975)
- Leaf and bone: African praise-poems: an anthology, with commentary (1980)
- Oya. In Praise of an African Goddess (1987)

=== Articles ===
- Where Does Your River Begin? (2004)
- Waterspirit-Carrying Woman (2009)
- Summer Visits Nezahualcoyotl (2009)
- Day and Night Hunting (2009)
