= Cocollona =

Folkloric creature from Girona

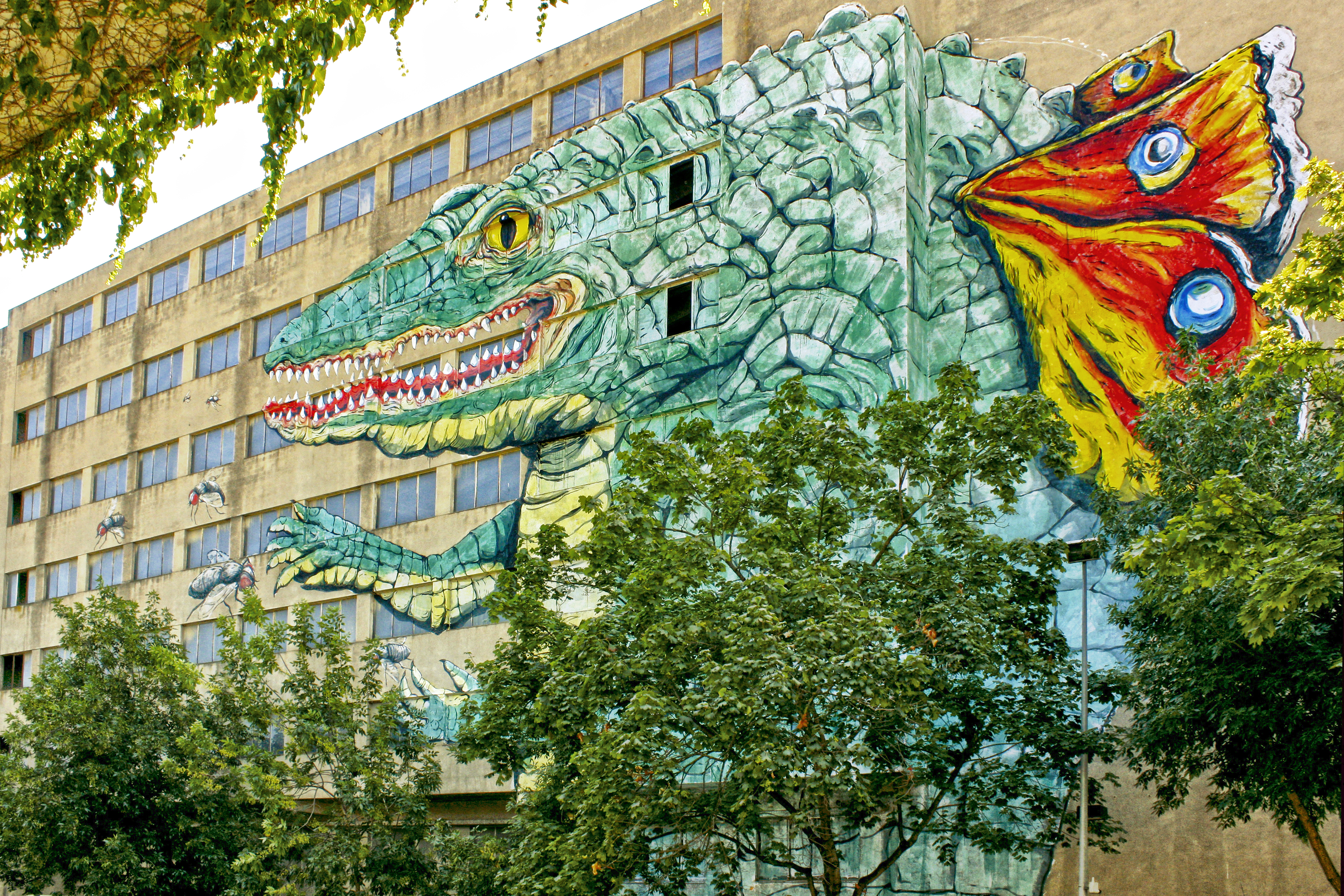
Graffiti Cocollona in Girona (Catalonia, Spain).

The Cocollona is a folkloric creature from Girona.

== Appearance ==
The cocollona is a river monster of Gironian mythology. According to legend, there was a convent of nuns who weren’t very devoted and that carried a messy life. Between them, there was a novice with a veritable religious vocation that complained about the life they carried.

The other nuns didn’t want to hear her reproaches, so they locked her inside a cell in the basement of the convent. She stayed there for years and due to the darkness and humidity, some scales started to come out until she became a crocodile. Thanks to the sanctity and purity of her soul, very beautiful butterfly wings began to grow in her back, transforming her into a “Cocollona”, half crocodile (cocodril in Catalan), half butterfly (papallona in Catalan).

After she died, her ghost was seen swimming the Onyar river, very close to where she was imprisoned. The legend says that only on full moon nights, towards dawn, those sensitive souls could see the ghost of Cocollona swimming down the river until the first rays of light came out.
