= Casa das Minas =

Afro-Brazilian temple in São Luís, Maranhão, Brazil

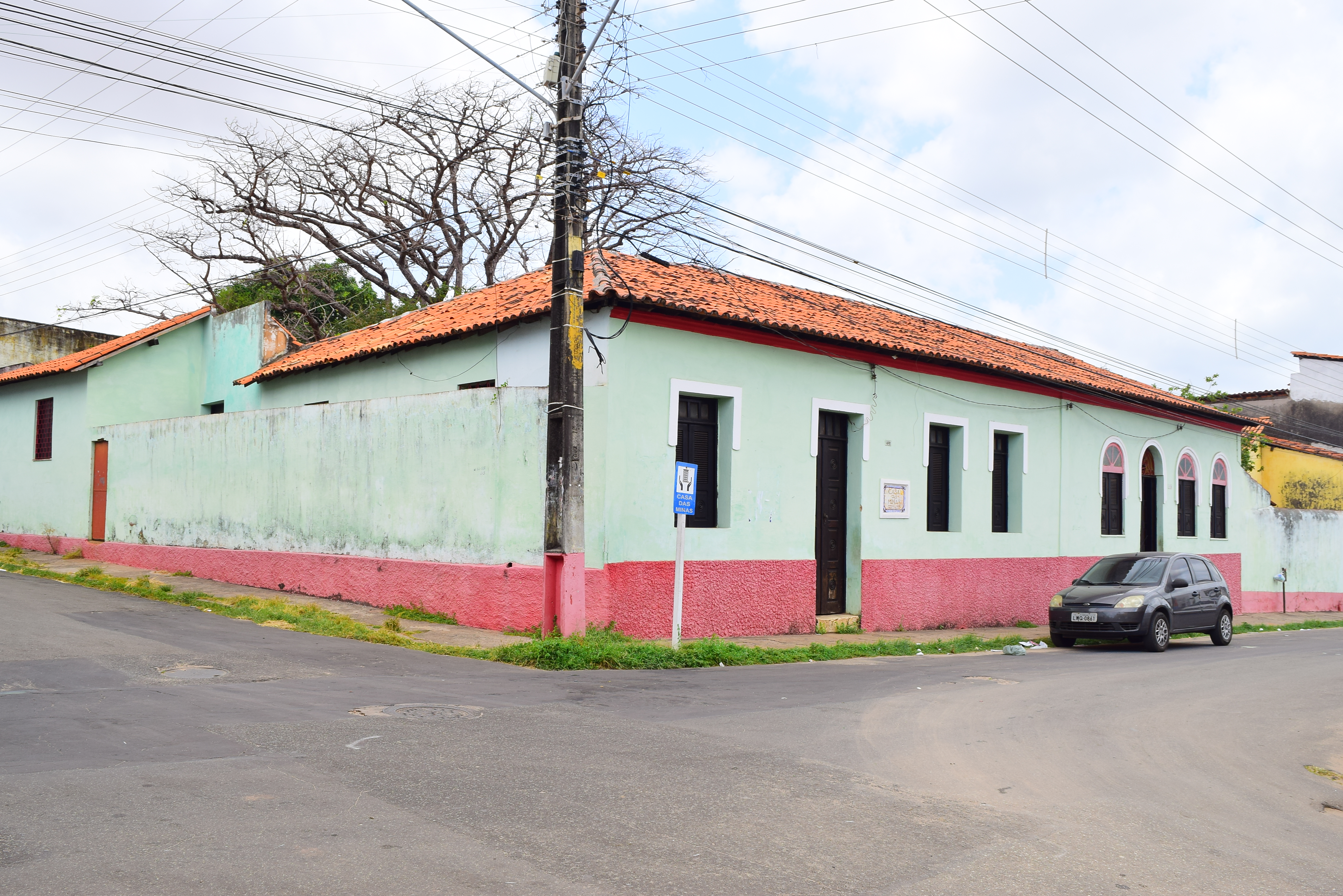
- Exterior of Casa das Minas

- Location of Casa das Minas in Brazil

Religion
- Affiliation: Tambor de Mina
- Year consecrated: 1840s

Location
- Municipality: São Luís
- State: Maranhão
- Country: Brazil
- Interactive map of Casa das Minas
- Coordinates: 2.538336°S 44.297969°W

Architecture
- Founder: Maria Jesuína
- Interior area: 660 square metres (7,100 ft^{2})

National Historic Heritage of Brazil
- Designated: 2002
- Reference no.: 1464

The Casa das Minas, or Querebentã Toi Zomadonu, is a 19th century Afro-Brazilian temple in São Luís, Maranhão, Brazil. It is located on Rua de São Pantaleão in the Historic Center of the city. It belongs to the Tambor de Mina, an Afro-Brazilian religion in Maranhão and the Amazon. The Tambor de Mina was established in São Luís in the 1840s by Maria Jesuína, a Dahomean (jeje) noblewoman from present-day Benin, as attested by a deed dated 1847.

The Casa das Minas is the only house of the Dahomean jeje tradition in Maranhão; the others are of Yoruba (nagô) origin in present-day Benin and Nigeria. The temple was persecuted by government authorities in the Estado Novo (1937–1946) period. Afro-Brazilian temples were removed from the Historic Center of São Luís, but after much pressure, the Casa das Minas and Casa de Nagô were allowed to remain, given their historical value. The temple became a focus of research in the same period, and Pierre Verger, among others, studied and worked at the temple. The Casa das Minas is noted for its liturgy and rich use of percussion instruments; its matriarchal lineage; and popular religious festivals.

The Casa das Minas was listed as a federal monument by the National Institute of Historic and Artistic Heritage (IPHAN) in 2002.

== History ==
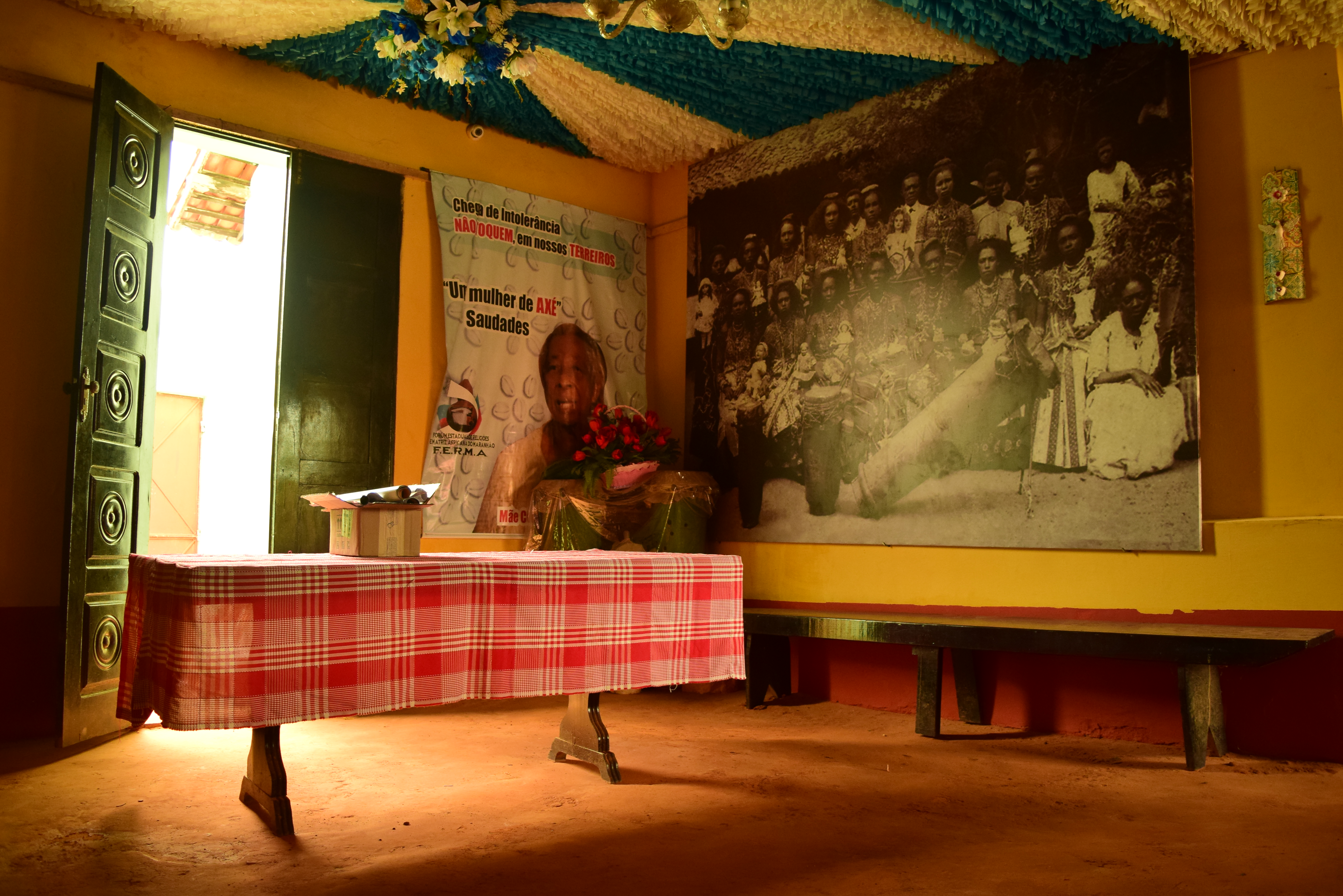
Central hall of the Casa das Minas

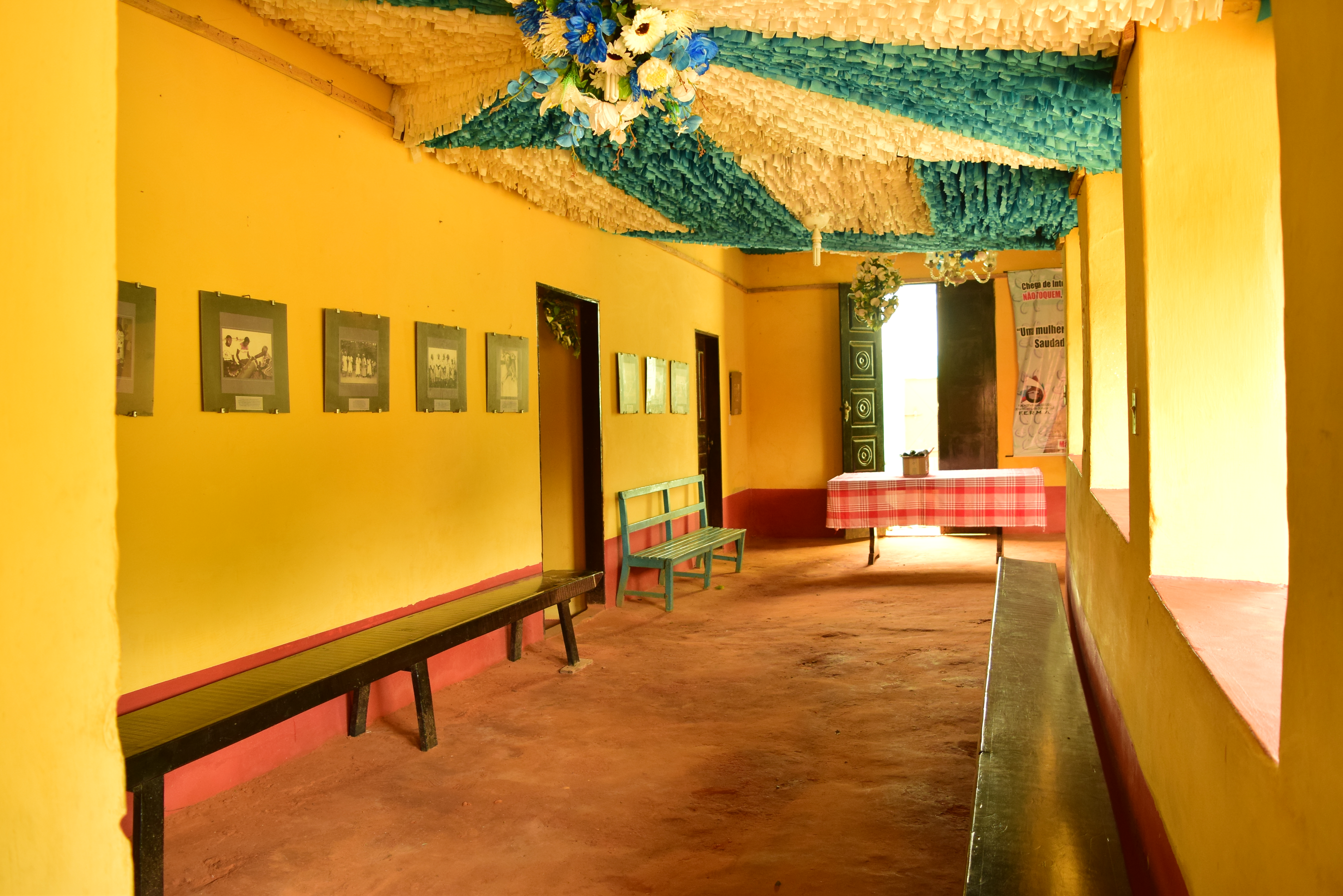
Internal room

The term nagô referred to enslaved people of Yoruba origin of present-day Egbado, Nigeria; they also inhabited areas of present-day Benin. Nagô was likely a derogatory term from the Fon language used by the dominant Kingdom of Dahomey in Benin. The term lost its derogatory meaning in Brazil. Enslaved people referred to as Jeje are associated with Yoruba people of the Gulf of Benin region. Like the Nagô, they were from a group with the Dahomey Kingdom in present-day Benin. The Jeje were likely from the Porto-Novo area, separate but related to the Yoruba religious center at Ilé-Ifẹ̀. The Casa das Minas liturgy is, like most Jeje temples, in the Gbe language, specifically the Fon language.

The Casa das Minas was founded approximately in the 1840s by an African woman named Maria Jesuína who was brought to Brazil as a slave. The ethnologist and photographer Pierre Verger stated that Maria Jesuína was likely Queen Nã Agontimé, a member of the royal family of Dahomey, wife of the arroçu (king) Agonglo and mother of Guezô. The oldest document of the Casa das Minas is a deed for the corner building dated to 1847. It records the name of Maria Jesuína and her associates who were, according to reports, also African.

The temple is consecrated to Zomadonu, the vodun of Maria Jesuína. The Casa das Minas has a matriarchal tradition, that is, it is only governed by women and only women can be possessed by voduns. Men's participation in temple rituals is limited to playing liturgical musical instruments. The last tobôssi boat was carried out in 1914; the vodunsi-gonjaí initiation died out in the 1970s. The vodunsi-he began in the 1960s, and died out in the 2010s.

The temple was persecuted during the Estado Novo period. Authorities in Maranhão pressured the temple to transfer to a location distant from the Historic Center of São Luís. Maranhão authorities, in the end, allowed the Casa das Minas and Casa de Nagô to remain, given their age. The temple became a focus of Brazilian research beginning in the 1930s. Manoel Nunes Pereira, Sérgio Ferretti, Pierre Verger, and Roger Bastide all visited and worked at the Casa das Minas; this research reinforced the prestige and importance of the temple and its importance to the minas drum of Maranhão.

Dona Celeste, one of the house's best-known vodunsis, made a historic visit to Benin, homeland of the voduns worshiped at the Casa das Minas, in 1993. Dona Deni began to exchange correspondence with the head of the Zomadonu cult in Abomey, Benin. The last leader and last living vodunsi of the house, Dona Deni de Tói Lepon, died in 2015. Since that date, Dahomean voduns no longer dance at Casa das Minas. The house is now run by the huntó (player) Euzébio Pinto, grandson of Dona Amélia (tenth leader of the house), who continues to carry out the traditional festivities of the temple.

Casa das Minas continues to hold festivities of which mix temple rituals and elements of Catholicism and popular culture. They include festivities such as the Divine Holy Spirit, the Burning of the Straws of the nativity scene with a litany, and a sweet table on Three Kings Day, Ash Wednesday, Hallelujah Saturday, and the feast days of Saint Benedict (synchronized with the African deity Averequete), Saint Cosmas and Saint Damian, and Saint Barbara. Some festivals feature performances by Crioula drum groups or bumba-meu-boi. The temple has become an important cultural hub, and is considered an example of resistance and memory of black culture and religiosity. Other temples from the same period in Maranhão no longer exist.

== Structure ==
The Casa das Minas is located on a plot of land measuring approximately 1,500 square metres (16,000 ft^{2}), with 660 square metres (7,100 ft^{2}) of built area. The house is made up of two larger buildings surrounded by a wall, with two doors and six windows facing Rua de São Pantaleão. They have numerous rooms distributed along a balcony and a corridor that gives access to the yard. The main house has a dining area open to visitors.

The dining area has a peji, a sanctuary or altar dedicated to the vodun, or traditional deities, of the Casa das Minas. This area of the temple is used for secular activities, such as eating, cleaning the temple, or socializing. The mina drums are placed in a demarcated area in the temple, covered with a cloth when not in use, symbolizing that they are "resting and should remain undisturbed." When drummers enter the enclosed space and uncover the percussion instruments, the temple areas become a sacred space, and secular activities cease.

== Ceremony ==
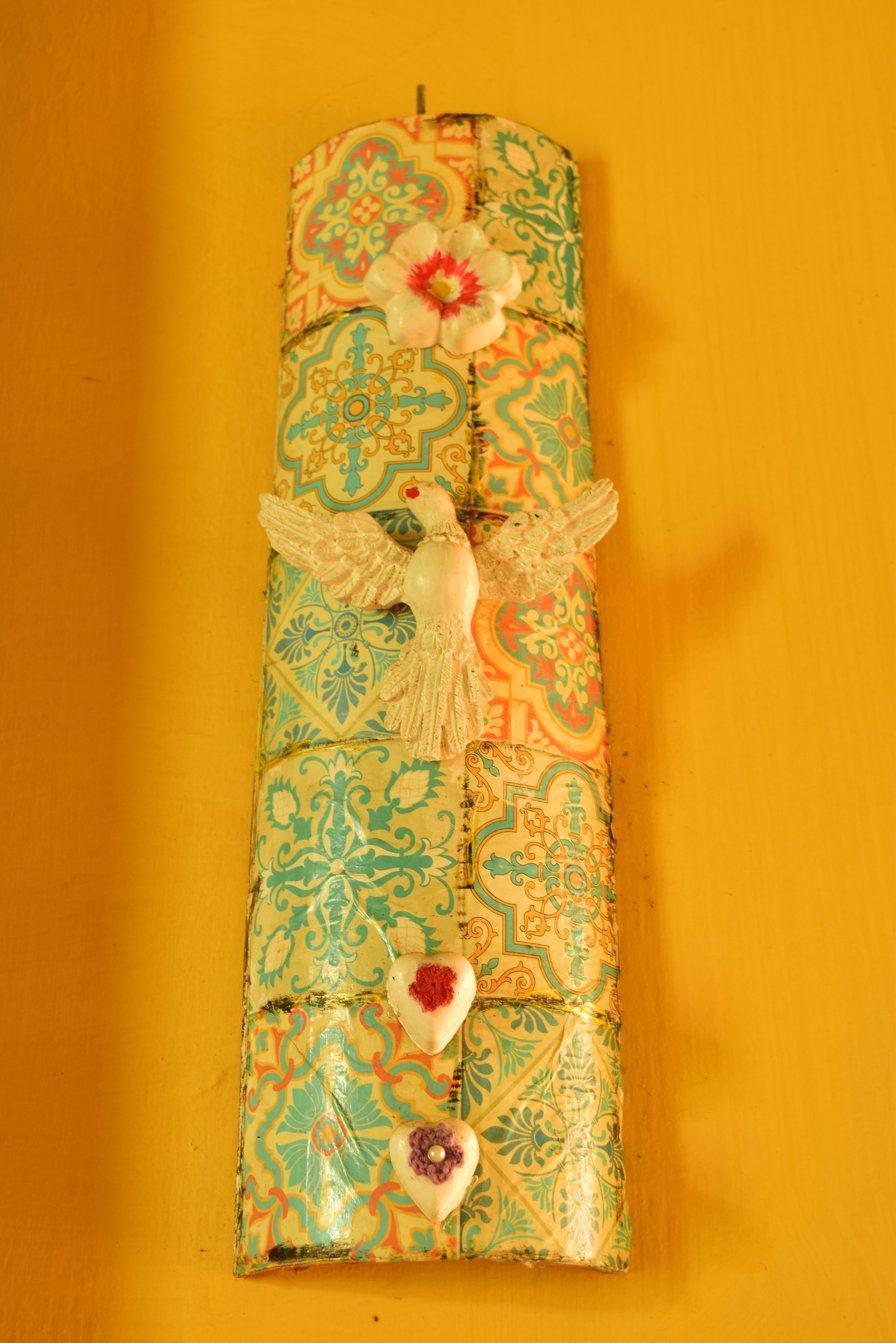
Religious object made of clay tile

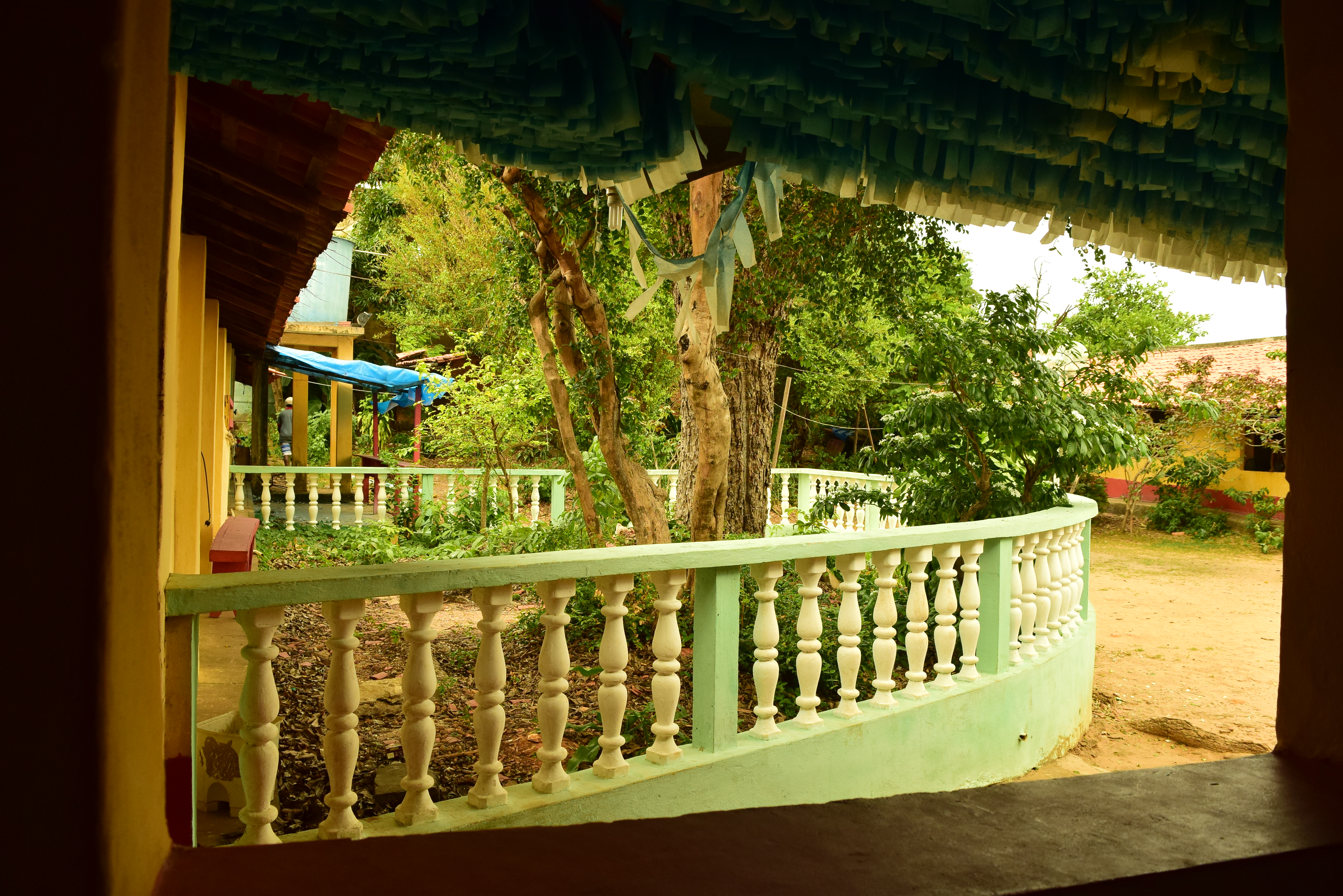
View of sacred trees

The Casa das Minas is the only temple in Maranhão with Jeje roots. Its percussion instruments, central to rituals in the temple, is described by Patricia Sandler as:

The ensemble has three conical upright drums, each with a single drumhead, including a small, medium, and large one (the run, grumplo, and rumpli, respectively). The drummers (known in the Jeje as runtó) place the drums upright on the floor: they play the two larger drums with one hand and a stick (aquidavi in Jeje, varete in Portuguese), and the smallest with two sticks. The ensemble is completed with small gourd shakers with seeds inside of them, held by a handle with one hand, and with an iron bell (ogâ in Jeje, ferro in Portuguese).

The percussion of the Casa das Minas, in the Jeje tradition, differs from the Nago temples of Maranhão. Temples of the Nago tradition have drums and other percussion instruments of different sizes, type, and pitch. Adherents at mina temples in Maranhão begin a ceremony by singing a Catholic liturgy. It is typically sung in Latin and Portuguese; the liturgy is only sung in Jeje at the Casa das Minas. Unlike other mina temple, the initiates enter a state of spiritual possession prior to the liturgy.

An abundance of food is essential to the Casa das Minas ceremony. Food is prepared in great abundance, both for presentation on the pegi. Adherents and visitors both eat richly at the ceremony, and are given leftovers. Crucially, temple food is given to the poor as alms. This custom is observed at both traditional temples in Maranhão such as the Casa das Minas, but also of newer temples in the state of the nago tradition.

== Lineage ==
The Casa das Minas was led, in chronological order, by:

- Maria Jesuína de Tói Zomadonu, the temple's 19th century founder. She is theorized today to have been the Dahomean aristocrat Na Agontimé prior to her enslavement
- Mãe Luísa de Tói Zomadonu, to the end of the first decade of the 1900s
- Mãe Hosana, to 1915
- Mãe Andresa de Tói Poliboji, 1915–1954
- Mãe Anéris Santos, 1954–1961
- Dona Manoca, 1961–1967
- Dona Leocádia de Toçá, 1967–1970
- Mãe Filomena, the final vodunsi-gonjaí, 1970–1972
- Dona Amância, the first vodunsi-he, 1972–1976
- Dona Amélia, 1976–1997
- Dona Deni de Tói Lepon, 1997–2015

== Heritage status ==
The Casa das Minas received federal heritage listing by the National Institute of Historic and Artistic Heritage (IPHAN) in 2002 under process no. 1464-T-00.
