= Minairó =

A minairó (Catalan pronunciation: [minəjˈɾo], plural minairons), also called manairó, menairó, diablorí in Catalonia or zaingorriak in the Basque country, is a tiny mythological being that some people save enclosed within a needle tube in some villages of the Pyrenees. They have other names in the valleys.

The minairons come from the perforate St John's-wort which blooms at the Saint John’s (the summer solstice) night. It grows in very deep caves guarded by giants and dragons and it only can be caught in the point of midnight on St. John’s Day. Some versions suggest that this herb is none other than the fern. It is unclear whether the minairó leaves the seed or it is the seed itself.

On the real nature of these beings, there is diversity of opinion. Some people ask if these beings can fly or not. Others say that they are as a swarm of tiny mosquitoes, almost invisible. Some people prefer to compare them with the bee, because of the noise they do buzzing when left the needles’ tube or cane. No one doubts, however, that they are so tiny that inside the cane there must be thousands and when one foregrounds, eager demands for work, saying, "What will we do? What will we say?”

The legend says that many of the screes of the Pyrenees have been works of these goblins, when his master opened the needle tube by mistake or accident and he desperately for his threats ("what will we do, what will we say?") ordered them to put all together rocks at any particular point nearby.

A handful of heirs of the Pyrenees main houses have been, on occasion, owners of the cane, through which the house went up like a mushroom. Among the owners of the cane, there are, of course, the heirs of the good houses, but there are also the bloodsuckers that used to live with bad gear right away.

Even today, the grandparents remember the houses that have these tireless labourers, in addition, working for free.

A complete list of the houses that had possessed the mysterious cane would include many: Llibrada de Benasque, Joaniquet de Forcat, Teixidor d'Aulet, Xollat de Perves, Jaume de Cabdella, Tor d'Alós, Badinet d'Isil, Sidro d'Estaon and Feu de La Guàrdia d'Ares. In other stories, ownership is attributed to a strong labourer, usually anonymous hard-capable. He alone completed the same job as three or four people. Of these gangs, Marçal de Farrera is one of those mentioned by name. It is said that he was to wage the towns of La Coma de Burg, carrying a long piece of scythe. When after the wages, some curious men asked him if it was true that he did Minairons work, he replied: "Do you know who my Minairons are? Good hoe and good balls!"

Most stories are variations on two patterns that were repeated, changing the characters and geographical locations.

We could head them as "the curious young man" who commanded them to pile-the-rocks and "hoe labourer" who commanded them to make a lot of meadow grass-wages.

Far from being a rare species unique to the Pyrenees, the Minairons are part of a family of tiny elves who live and work in the forests of European fairy tales.

== Links ==
- http://www.femturisme.cat/ca/ruta/una-ruta-de-conte-les-terres-dels-minairons
- Sobre els minairons - www.xtec.cat
