= Aloja (mythology) =

Creature in Catalan mythology

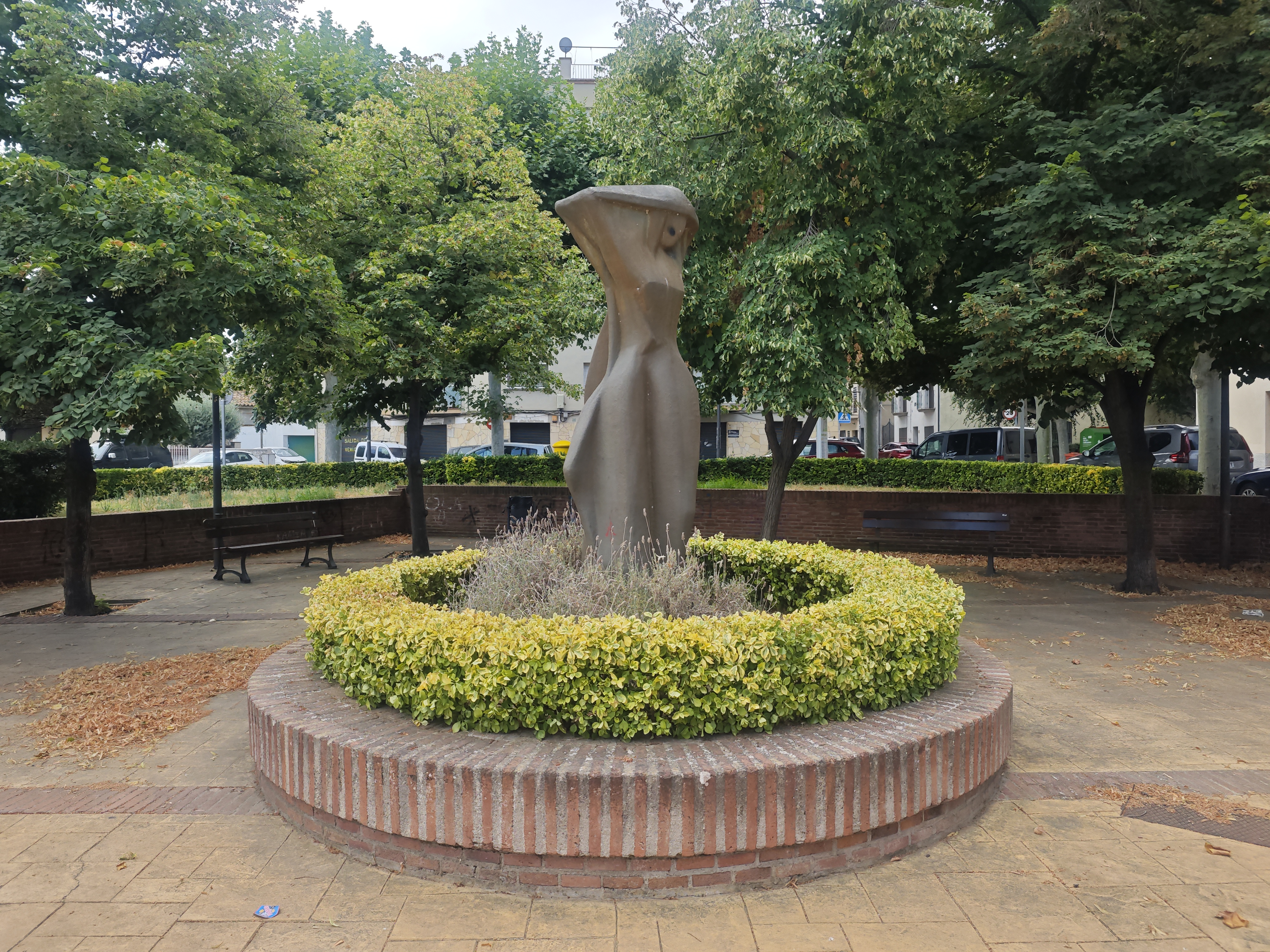
Statue depiction of an aloja

In Catalan mythology an aloja (Catalan pronunciation: [əˈlɔʒə]; plural aloges), also known as dona d'aigua, goja or paitida, is a feminine being that lives in places with fresh water. These "water-women" are said to be able to turn into water blackbirds.

== Legend ==
According to legend, these women are not immortal, but can live for thousands of years and retain their youth.

It is said that the lakes where the dones d'aigua bathe can boil in anger if any stranger enters them. In Mallorca, the most famous water-woman is Maria Enganxa. According to tradition, she lives inside all the wells and cisterns and takes all the children that pass near them with her hook.

== Appearance ==
Water-women symbolize the fertility and life-giving virtues of water and are said to possess oneiric beauty.

They are said to appear as small and innocent women, with a high self-esteem and very prideful of their beauty. They are good women and try to bring wealth and well-being to the areas they live in.

According to myth, water-women are nocturnal; have shimmering gold or red hair, and emerald or deep blue eyes; wear fine, rich clothes; and enjoy viewing their reflections in lakes on full-moon nights. Some of them are said to have beautiful wings of various colors. Many are said to carry magic wands carved from hazel, which is considered to be the only wood capable of casting spells.

== Human interaction ==
There are many legends about romance and marriage between water-women and humans. In order to marry a water-woman, a human must agree to the water-woman's conditions. Often, one of the conditions is that the husband cannot reveal that his wife is a water-woman. If he does, the water-woman leaves him and disappears with his fortune. However, it is also said that the water-woman will still comb her children's hair and dress them every morning.

Water-women are purported to avoid any relations with humans, though this is not always possible. When contact with humans does occur, it often turns out ill for the humans.
