= Unspoken Water =

In Scottish custom, Unspoken Water was water believed to have healing properties when collected "from under a bridge, over which the living pass and the dead are carried, brought in the dawn or twilight to the house of a sick person, without the bearer’s speaking, either in going or returning".

According to The Mirror of Literature, Amusement, and Instruction, Volume 12, No. 323, July 19, 1828, "the modes of application are various: sometimes the invalid takes three draughts of it before anything is spoken. Sometimes it is thrown over the houses, the vessel in which it was contained being thrown after it".

The custom is long obsolete. The 1901 The Book of Saint Fittick by Thomas White Ogilvie contains an elderly woman's account of being "the last wife in Torry to cure a bairn wi' unspoken water ... comin' or gaun I spak' tae naebody — for that's what mak's unspoken water".

== See also ==
- Holy water
