= Pierre Verger =

French photographer, anthropologist, writer and professor (1902–1996)

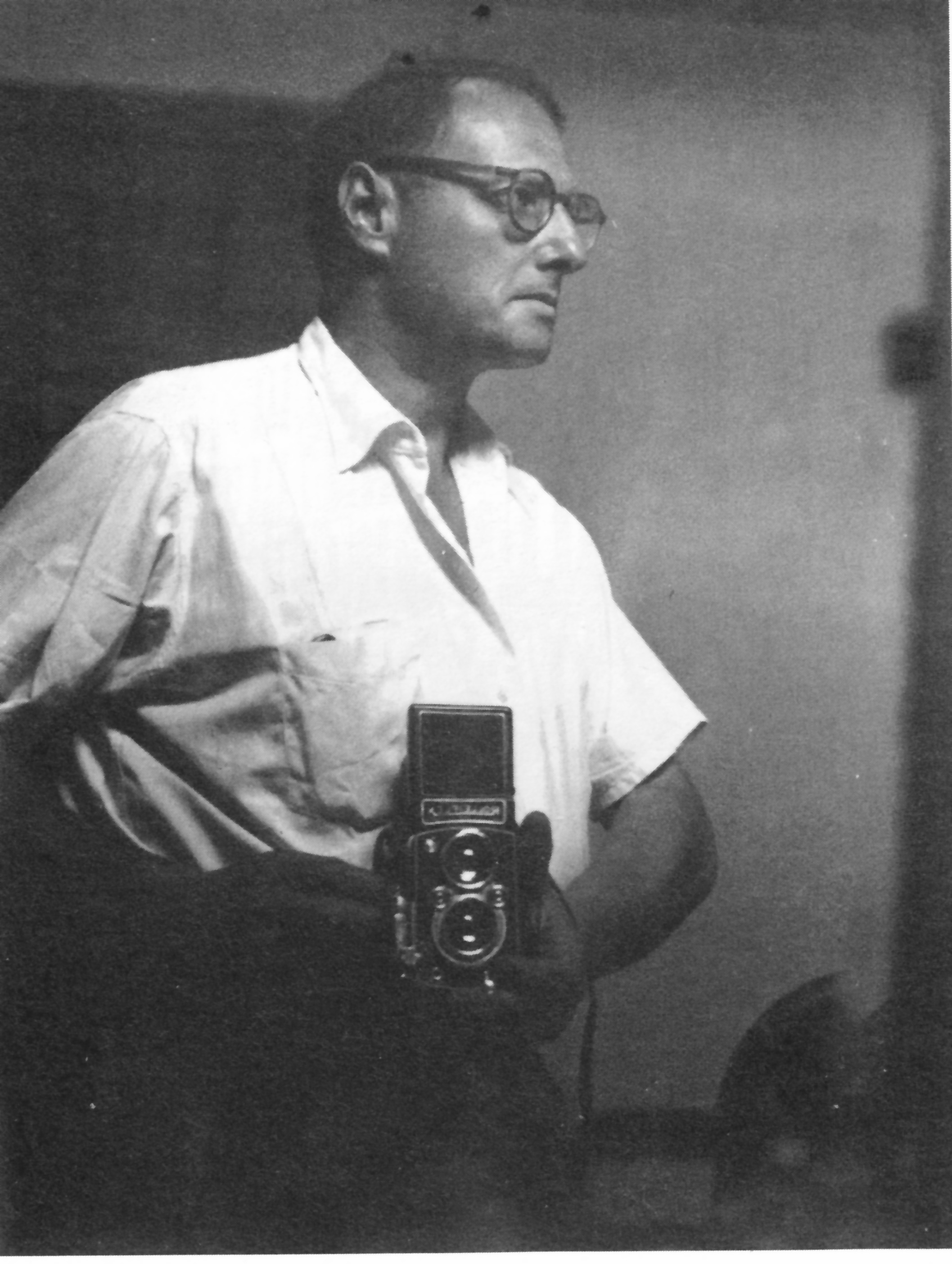
Auto-portrait of Verger (1952)

Pierre Edouard Leopold Verger, alias Fatumbi or Fátúmbí (4 November 1902, in Paris – 11 February 1996, in Salvador, Brazil) was a photographer, self-taught ethnographer, and babalawo (Yoruba priest of Ifà) who devoted most of his life to the study of the African diaspora — the slave trade, the African-based religions of the new world, and the resulting cultural and economical flows from and to Africa.

== Life ==
At the age of 30, after losing his family, Verger took up the career of journalistic photographer. Over the next 15 years, he traveled the four continents, documenting many civilizations that would soon be effaced by progress. His destinations included Tahiti (1933); United States, Japan, and China (1934 and 1937); Italy, Spain, Sudan (now Mali), Niger, Upper Volta, Togo and Dahomey (now Benin, 1935); the West Indies (1936); Mexico (1937, 1939, and 1957); the Philippines and Indochina (now Thailand, Laos, Cambodia and Vietnam, 1938); Guatemala and Ecuador (1939); Senegal (as a conscript, 1940); Argentina (1941), Peru and Bolivia (1942 and 1946); and finally Brazil (1946). His photographs were featured in magazines such as Paris-Soir, Daily Mirror (under the pseudonym of "Mr. Lensman"), Life, and Paris Match. In 1955, his graphic composition of three women bearing vases of flowers on turbaned heads was selected by curator Edward Steichen for MoMA's 1955 world-touring The Family of Man exhibition, seen by 9 million visitors.

In the city of Salvador, Brazil he fell in love with the place and people, and decided to stay for good. Having become interested in the local history and culture, he turned from errant photographer to a researcher of the African diaspora in the Americas. His subsequent voyages are focused on that goal: the west coast of Africa and Paramaribo (1948), Haiti (1949), and Cuba (1957). After studying the Yoruba culture and its influences in Brazil, Verger became an initiate of the Candomblé religion, and officiated at its rituals. During a visit to Benin, he was initiated into Ifá (ikin divination), became a babalawo (priest) of Orunmila, and was renamed Fátúmbí ("he who is reborn through the Ifá oracle").

Veger's contributions to ethnography are embodied in dozens of conference papers, journal articles and books, and were recognized by Sorbonne University, which conferred upon him a doctoral degree (Docteur 3eme Cycle) in 1966 — quite a feat for someone who dropped out of high school at 17.

Verger continued to study and document his chosen subject right until his death in Salvador, at the age of 93. During that time he became a professor at the Federal University of Bahia in 1973, where he was responsible for the establishment of the Afro-Brazilian Museum in Salvador; and served as visiting professor at the University of Ifé in Nigeria. The non-profit Pierre Verger Foundation in Salvador, which he established to continue his work, holds more than 63,000 photos and negatives taken until 1973, as well as his papers and correspondence.

His life has been documented in a book by Jérôme Souty and a movie.
