= Water Resources Development Act =

Water Resources Development Act (WRDA), is a reference to public laws enacted by Congress to deal with various aspects of water resources: environmental, structural, navigational, flood protection, hydrology, etc.

Typically, the United States Army Corps of Engineers administers the bulk of the Act's requirements.

There have been a series of WRDAs:

- Water Resources Development Act of 1974, WRDA 1974, Pub. L. 93–251
- Water Resources Development Act of 1976, WRDA 1976, Pub. L. 94–587
- Water Resources Development Act of 1986, WRDA 1986, Pub. L. 99–662 (WRDA86.pdf, via TaxPayer.net)
- Water Resources Development Act of 1988, WRDA 1988, Pub. L. 100–676
- Water Resources Development Act of 1990, WRDA 1990, Pub. L. 101–640
- Water Resources Development Act of 1992, WRDA 1992, Pub. L. 102–580
- Water Resources Development Act of 1996, WRDA 1996, Pub. L. 104–303 (text) (PDF)
- Water Resources Development Act of 1999, WRDA 1999, Pub. L. 106–53 (text) (PDF)
- Water Resources Development Act of 2000, WRDA 2000, Pub. L. 106–541 (text) (PDF)
- Water Resources Development Act of 2007, WRDA 2007, Pub. L. 110–114 (text) (PDF)
- Water Resources Development Act of 2014, WRDA 2014, Pub. L. 113–121 (text) (PDF)
- Water Resources Development Act of 2016, WRDA 2016, included as part of the Water Infrastructure Improvements for the Nation Act (WIIN Act), Pub. L. 114–322 (text) (PDF)
- Water Resources Development Act of 2020, WRDA 2020, Division AA of Pub. L. 116–260 (text) (PDF)
- Water Resources Development Act of 2022, WRDA 2022, included as part of the James M. Inhofe National Defense Authorization Act for Fiscal Year 2023 (NDAA 2023).

== Related acts ==
- River and Harbor Act of 1938, Pub. L. 75–685, June 20, 1938
- Flood Control Act of 1938, Pub. L. 75–761, June 28, 1938
- River and Harbor Act of 1940, Pub. L. 76–868, October 17, 1940
- Flood Control Act of 1941, Pub. L. 77–228, August 18, 1941
- Flood Control Act of 1944, Pub. L. 78–534, December 22, 1944
- River and Harbor Act of 1945, Pub. L. 79–14, March 2, 1945
- River and Harbor Act of 1946, Pub. L. 79–525, July 24, 1946
- Flood Control Act of 1946, Pub. L. 79–526, July 24, 1946
- River and Harbor Act of 1948, Pub. L. 80–858, June 30, 1948 (Flood Control Act of 1948)
- River and Harbor Act of 1950, Pub. L. 81–516, May 17, 1950 (Flood Control Act of 1950)
- River and Harbor Act of 1954, Pub. L. 83–780, September 3, 1954 (Flood Control Act of 1954)
- River and Harbor Act of 1958, Pub. L. 85–500, July 3, 1958 (Flood Control Act of 1958)
- River and Harbor Act of 1960, Pub. L. 86–645, July 14, 1960 (Flood Control Act of 1960)
- River and Harbor Act of 1962, Pub. L. 87–874, October 23, 1962 (Flood Control Act of 1962)
- River and Harbor Act of 1965, Pub. L. 89–298, October 27, 1965 (Flood Control Act of 1965)
- River and Harbor Act of 1966, Pub. L. 89–789, November 7, 1966 (Flood Control Act of 1966)
- River and Harbor Act of 1968 (Flood Control Act of 1968)
- River and Harbor Act of 1970, Pub. L. 91–611, December 31, 1970 (Flood Control Act of 1970)
- Flood Control Act of 1972, Pub. L. 93–251, March 7, 1974

== See also ==
- Flood Control Act
- Rivers and Harbors Act
- Watershed Protection and Flood Prevention Act of 1954
