= Water Resources Development Act of 1999 =

- Long title: An Act to provide for the conservation and development of water and related resources, to authorize the United States Army Corps of Engineers to construct various projects for improvements to rivers and harbors of the United States, and for other purposes.
- Enacted by: the 106th United States Congress

Citations
- Public law: Pub. L. 106-53
- Statutes at Large: 113 Stat. 269

Legislative history
- Introduced in the Senate as S. 507 by John Warner on March 2, 1999; Signed into law by President Bill Clinton on August 17, 1999

The Water Resources Development Act of 1999 (WRDA 1999), Pub. L. 106–53 (text) (PDF), was enacted by Congress of the United States on August 17, 1999. Most of the provisions of WRDA 1999 are administered by the United States Army Corps of Engineers.

== Title I: Water Resources Projects ==
Authorizes projects and studies for small projects for navigation, flood control, environmental restoration, recreation, hurricane and storm damage reduction, bank stabilization, ecosystem restoration, shore protection, aquifer storage and recovery, and navigation mitigation in Alaska, Arizona, California, Delaware, Delaware, New Jersey, New York, Florida, Guam, Georgia, Illinois, Indiana, Kansas, Kentucky, Louisiana, Maine, Maryland, Massachusetts, Michigan, Mississippi, Montana, Oregon, Virginia, Minnesota, Ohio, Pennsylvania, Missouri, Puerto Rico, Rhode Island, Tennessee, Texas, West Virginia, and Washington.

== Title II: General Provisions ==
Title II amends the Flood Control Act of 1936 (FCA 1936) to authorize use of funds contributed by States and other political subdivisions for environmental restoration (currently, only flood control) work.

Amends the FCA 1948 to allow the construction of both small structural and nonstructural projects, and to increase from $5 million to $7 million the maximum amount to be expended for any single project

Amends the FCA 1960:

- to provide that certain fee collection limitations shall not apply to funds voluntarily contributed by State and local governments and non-Federal public agencies for expanding the scope of services requested by such entities
- to direct the Secretary to coordinate with the Director of the Federal Emergency Management Agency (FEMA) and other appropriate agencies to ensure that flood control projects and plans are complementary and integrated

Amends the Rivers and Harbors Act of 1958 (RHA 1958):

- to include any noxious aquatic plant growth within a comprehensive program for the control of aquatic growth
- to increase the annual authorization of appropriations for such program. Encourages the Secretary, under such program, to utilize contracts, cooperative agreements, and grants with colleges and universities and other non-Federal entities.

Amends the RHA 1968 to authorize additional shore damage mitigation activities for the Atlantic Intracoastal Waterway and the Gulf Intracoastal Waterway.

Amends the WRDA 1976 to reduce from 50 to 35 the percent of total cost to be borne by States for placing dredged sand on State beaches. Directs the Secretary to work with Ohio and other Great Lakes States to fully implement and maximize beneficial reuse of dredged materials along Great Lakes shores. Authorizes the Secretary to design and construct certain shore protection projects, and to stabilize beach erosion, at specified Texas shorelines.

Amends the WRDA 1986:

- to include certain lakes and ponds in California and New Hampshire as authorized projects.
- to limit the non-Federal share of first costs which may be satisfied through in-kind contributions in connection with fish and wildlife mitigation projects.
- to provide the non-Federal share of construction costs for projects for periodic shore nourishment. Amends the Outer Continental Shelf Lands Act to prohibit a fee charge to a State or local government for the use of Outer Continental Shelf sand, gravel, and shell resources.

Amends the WRDA 1990:

- to provide for the calculation of benefits for a proposed project for nonstructural flood damage reduction. Allows current flood control projects to be reevaluated to consider nonstructural alternatives.
- to reduce from 50 to 35 percent of project costs the required non-Federal share for removing contaminated sediments from U.S. navigable waters
- to increase authorization of appropriations for such projects
- to add specified projects in New Jersey, Oklahoma, and Oregon.

Amends the WRDA 1992:

- to require that technologies selected for demonstration at a sediments decontamination project in the New York-New Jersey Harbor be intended to result in practical end-use products.
- to allow nonprofit entities to serve as the non-Federal interest for projects for beneficial uses of dredged material.

Amends the WRDA 1996:

- to permit studies undertaken by the Secretary concerning the Pacific region to include flood damage reduction and environmental restoration.
- to extend through FY 2003 the Everglades and South Florida Ecosystem Restoration program.
- to allow nonprofit entities to serve as the non-Federal interest for aquatic ecosystem restoration projects and for watershed management, restoration, and development projects
- to include for such watershed projects certain additional areas in California, Illinois, North Carolina, West Virginia, and Florida.
- to extend through December 31, 2003, the authority to sell annual passes for the use of recreation facilities.
- to allow non-Federal interests to carry out construction under flood control projects only if the Secretary approves such construction after reviewing construction studies and design documents.

Authorizes projects to reduce flood hazards and restore the natural functions and values of rivers throughout the United States. Requires non-Federal interests to pay 35 percent of the cost of any environmental restoration or nonstructural flood control project carried out. Outlines project selection criteria, policies, and procedures. Requires a report to specified congressional committees. Provides a cost limitation of $30 million on any single project. Authorizes appropriations.

Directs a report to Congress on the state of U.S. shorelines; and establishment of a national coastal databank for data on the geophysical and climatological characteristics of such shorelines.

Authorizes during FY 1999 through 2002 withholding of a specified amount of recreation user fees for repair and maintenance projects, interpretation, signage, habitat or facility enhancement, resource preservation, annual operation and maintenance, and law enforcement related to public use at recreation sites.

Directs inventory and review all Corps activities that are not inherently governmental in nature in accordance with the Federal Activities Inventory Reform Act of 1998.

== Title III: Project-Related Provisions ==
Modifies or reauthorizes projects for flood control, navigation, habitat restoration, water supply, shoreline protection, shore protection and harbor mitigation, beach erosion control, storm damage reduction and shoreline erosion protection, recreation, pedestrian access features, hurricane protection, levees, environmental infrastructure, mitigation of fish and wildlife losses, watersheds, canal system restoration, environmental restoration, and rediversion in Alabama and Mississippi, Alaska, Arkansas, Louisiana, Oklahoma and Texas, California, Delaware, New Jersey, and Pennsylvania, the District of Columbia, Florida, Idaho, Illinois, Indiana, Iowa, Louisiana, Maryland, Michigan, Mississippi, Missouri, Kansas, Iowa and Nebraska, New Jersey, New York, North Dakota, Oklahoma, Oregon, Pennsylvania, Rhode Island, South Carolina, Tennessee, Texas, Utah, Virginia, West Virginia, and West Virginia and Pennsylvania.

Deauthorizes navigation projects in Connecticut, Maine, and Massachusetts.

Modifies specific projects by name in Maine, California, Kentucky, Alabama, Nevada, Louisiana, Michigan, Arkansas, Missouri, and Oklahoma.

== Title IV: Studies ==
Directs study and recommendations to specified congressional committees on non-Federal cost-sharing requirements for the construction, operation, and maintenance of deep draft harbor projects.

Directs studies with respect to specified projects in Arkansas, California, Florida, Georgia, Idaho, Illinois and Wisconsin, Louisiana, Massachusetts, Michigan, Michigan and Ohio, Mississippi, Montana, Nevada, New Mexico, New York, New York and Vermont, North Carolina, Ohio, Indiana, and Michigan, Pennsylvania, South Carolina, South Dakota, Texas, Utah, Washington, West Virginia, the Great Lakes, the Chesapeake Bay, the Upper Mississippi and Illinois Rivers, and the Susquehanna River Basin and the upper Chesapeake Bay.

== Title V: Miscellaneous Provisions ==
Authorizes the Secretary to complete remaining portions of Natural Resources Conservation Service flood control projects at Llagas Creek, California, and Thornton Reservoir, Illinois.

Amends the Flood Control Act of 1928 to increase the annual salary of members of the Mississippi River Commission.

Amends the WRDA 1992 to authorize appropriations for construction assistance for specified projects in California, Connecticut, Georgia, Indiana, Louisiana, New Hampshire, New Jersey, New York, Massachusetts, Michigan, Mississippi, Missouri, North Carolina, Oklahoma, Oregon, Pennsylvania, Tennessee, Utah, and Virginia.

Directs review of sediment dredging technologies and to select the technology that will increase the effectiveness of removing contaminated sediments and significantly reduce contamination of the water column.

Authorizes safety assistance at specified dams in California, Indiana, and Pennsylvania.

Amends the WRDA 1986:

- to use authority under such Act for the control of sea lamprey at any Great Lakes basin location.
- to increase the amount authorized to conduct measurements of Lake Michigan diversions, and to extend such authorization through FY 2003.
- relating to the Upper Mississippi River environmental management program to include an applied research program, require program evaluation every six years, increase and extend through FY 2009 its authorization of appropriations, and require information on habitat needs assessments to be included in required reports.
- to increase the authorization of appropriations for environmental assistance to non-Federal interests in southern and eastern Kentucky and flood control and improvements to rainfall drainage systems in Jefferson, Orleans, and St. Tammany Parishes, Louisiana.

Amends WRDA 1996 to add specified areas in Florida, Louisiana, and Washington under a program for the maintenance of navigation channels.

Amends WRDA 1992 to increase the annual authorization of appropriations for a monitoring program for the Atlantic coast of New York.

Amends WRDA 1996:

- to require a report in connection with recurring flooding and related problems near Pierre and Ft. Pierre, South Dakota.
- to include the Chemung River watershed, New York, under a water resources development program for the Upper Susquehanna River Basin in Pennsylvania and New York.
- relating to a research and development program for Columbia River basin salmon survival
- to increase the amount authorized for a water monitoring station on the Flathead River in Montana
- to direct assistance to the Narragansett Bay Commission for the construction of a combined sewer (currently, river) overflow management facility in Rhode Island, and increase the authorization of appropriations for such purpose.

Amends the Marine Protection, Research, and Sanctuaries Act of 1976 to extend until January 1, 2003, the authority of the EPA Administrator to designate sites for the dumping of nontoxic or nonhazardous wastes.

Amends the Energy and Water Development Appropriations Act of 1994 to revise conveyance conditions and required compensation with respect to the San Jacinto Disposal Area in Galveston, Texas.

Amends the Reclamation Wastewater and Groundwater Study and Facilities Act to direct the planning, design, and construction of the Phoenix metropolitan water reclamation and reuse project to utilize fully wastewater from the regional wastewater treatment plant for specified uses in the Phoenix metropolitan area.

Authorizes, in evaluating water control management, to consider a regionalized water control management plan, but prohibits the implementation of such plan until a report is submitted to specified congressional committees.

Authorizes specified projects for the beneficial use of dredged material.

Directs a plan for a project to protect and enhance fish and wildlife habitat of the Missouri River and middle Mississippi River.

Authorizes technical planning and design assistance to non-Federal interests and conduct other site-specific studies to formulate and evaluate fish screens, fish passage devices, and other measures to decrease the incidence of juvenile and adult fish inadvertently entering irrigation systems.

Directs completion of required reports in connection with projects in Connecticut, Florida, Indiana, Louisiana, and the Upper Mississippi River.

Directs the Army, the Federal Emergency Management Agency (FEMA), Environmental Protection Agency (EPA), and the heads of other appropriate Federal agencies to assist Oregon in developing and implementing a comprehensive basin-wide strategy in the Willamette River basin.

Directs specific actions or studies:

- for specific by-name projects of various types in Alaska, Alabama, Arkansas, Arizona, New Mexico, Utah, Arkansas, California, Georgia, Florida, Iowa, Illinois, Kansas, Maryland, Delaware, Massachusetts, Michigan, Minnesota, Mississippi, Missouri, Montana, New Jersey, New Mexico, New York, Nevada, Ohio, Oklahoma, Oregon, Pennsylvania, Puerto Rico, Rhode Island, Texas, Virginia, West Virginia
- involving prominent geographic or manmade feature
  - Ambassador Bridge
  - Saint Lawrence Seaway
  - Onondaga Lake
  - Chesapeake and Ohio Canal
- military installations
  - McClellan Air Force Base
  - Mather Air Force Base
  - Sacramento Army Depot

Authorizes the development of a management strategy to address problems associated with toxic microorganisms and the resulting degradation of ecosystems in tidal and nontidal wetlands and waters of the United States.

Authorizes technical, planning, and design assistance to Federal and non-Federal interests for carrying out projects to address water quality problems caused by drainage and related activities from abandoned and inactive noncoal mines. Authorizes the maintenance of a technology database for the reclamation of abandoned mines.

Directs real estate transactions in Kansas, Maryland, Missouri, Oklahoma, Oregon, South Carolina, Washington, and West Virginia. Transfers administrative jurisdiction over the McNary National Wildlife Refuge from the Army to the Department of the Interior.

Designates politically gratuitous names for specified waterways and facilities in Arkansas and Rhode Island.

Directs removal of the Embry Dam on the Rappahannock River, Virginia, at full Federal expense.

Directs the environmental restoration and remediation of the Avtex Fibers facility in Front Royal, Virginia, at full Federal expense. Directs the Department of Defense to make specified funds available for such purpose.

== Title VI: Cheyenne River Sioux Tribe, Lower Brule Sioux Tribe, and State of South Dakota Terrestrial Wildlife Habitat Restoration ==
Directs the State of South Dakota, the Cheyenne River Sioux Tribe, and the Lower Brule Sioux Tribe, as a condition for the receipt of Federal funds under this title, to each develop a plan for the restoration of terrestrial wildlife habitat loss that occurred as a result of flooding related to the Big Bend and Oahe projects carried out as part of the Pick-Sloan Missouri River Basin program. Requires each such plan to be submitted to the Secretary for review and submission to the appropriate congressional committees. Directs the Secretary to make funds available to carry out such plans. Outlines transitional provisions and authorized fund uses.

Establishes the South Dakota Terrestrial Wildlife Habitat Restoration Trust Fund, the Cheyenne River Sioux Tribe Terrestrial Wildlife Restoration Trust Fund, the Lower Brule Sioux Tribe Terrestrial Wildlife Habitat Restoration Trust Fund.

Directs transfer to the South Dakota Department of Game, Fish, and Parks specified Federal lands for fish and wildlife or public recreation purposes. Directs the Secretary to transfer specified Corps lands and recreation areas for the use of the Cheyenne River and Lower Brule Sioux Tribes.

Directs the Secretary to arrange for the U.S. Geological Survey to complete by October 31, 1999, a comprehensive study of the potential impacts of the transfer of lands under this title on water flows in the Missouri River. Prohibits such transfers until the Secretary determines that the transfers will not significantly reduce the amount of water flow to the downstream States of the Missouri River.

== See also ==
- Flood Control Act
- Rivers and Harbors Act
