= Water Resources Development Act of 1996 =

United States Congressional Act

- Long title: An Act to provide for the conservation and development of water and related resources, to authorize the Secretary of the Army to construct various projects for improvements to rivers and harbors of the United States, and for other purposes.
- Enacted by: the 104th United States Congress

Citations
- Public law: Pub. L. 104-303
- Statutes at Large: 110 Stat. 3658

Legislative history
- Introduced in the Senate as S. 640 by John Warner on March 28, 1995; Signed into law by President Bill Clinton on October 12, 1996

The Water Resources Development Act of 1996 (WRDA 1996) is part of Pub. L. 104–303 (text) (PDF), was enacted by Congress of the United States on October 12, 1996. Most of the provisions of WRDA 1996 are administered by the United States Army Corps of Engineers.

== Title I: Water Resources Projects ==
Authorizes specified water resources development and conservation projects for navigation, flood control, flood and storm damage reduction, environmental preservation and restoration, shoreline erosion protection, hydropower, and hurricane damage reduction in California, the District of Columbia and Maryland, Florida, Georgia and South Carolina, Illinois, Kentucky, Louisiana, Missouri, Nebraska, New Mexico, New York, North Carolina, Ohio, Oregon, Puerto Rico, South Dakota, Texas, and West Virginia. Specifies total costs, estimated Federal and non-Federal costs, and funding sources and requirements.

Authorizes specified projects for navigation, bluff stabilization, flood control and water supply, storm damage reduction and shoreline protection, streambank erosion protection, hurricane damage prevention, and navigation and safety improvements in Alaska, California, Delaware, Florida, Indiana, Louisiana, Maryland and Delaware, and New Jersey in accordance with a final report of the Chief of Engineers.

Directs study and carrying out of specified projects regarding

- flood control in California, Illinois, Louisiana, Michigan, Missouri, Montana, New York, and Oregon
- bank stabilization in Indiana, Pennsylvania, and Tennessee
- navigation in Alaska, Illinois, Michigan, Minnesota, Missouri, and New York
- shoreline protection in Florida and New York
- snagging and sediment removal in Minnesota; and
- habitat and environmental restoration in California, Oregon, and Utah.

== Title II: General Provisions ==
Amends the Water Resources Development Act of 1986 to

- revise cost sharing provisions with respect to dredged material disposal areas
- revise cost sharing requirements with respect to the operation and maintenance (O&M) of dredged material disposal facilities; and
- require the consideration of funding requirements and the equitable apportionment of costs of O&M in the dredging of commercial navigation harbors.

Increases from 25 to 35 percent the non-Federal share for nonstructural and other flood control projects. Sets forth criteria and procedures relating to the ability of a non-Federal interest to pay for flood control or agricultural water supply.

Requires non-Federal stakeholders to: (1) agree to participate in and comply with applicable Federal floodplain management and flood insurance programs; and (2) prepare a flood plain management plan designed to reduce the impacts of future flood events in the project area. Directs the Secretary to: (1) develop guidelines for the preparation of such plans; and (2) conduct, and report to the Congress on, a review of policies, procedures, and techniques relating to the evaluation and development of flood control measures in order to identify impediments to justifying nonstructural flood control measures as alternatives to structural measures.

Requires determination if the operation of a project has contributed to the degradation of the environment; and (2) undertake appropriate environmental restoration and enhancement measures.

Amends the Water Resources Development Act of 1990 to add environmental remediation in the removal of dredged material under a navigation project; and (2) increase funding for the removal of contaminated sediments from navigable waters. Lists specified projects to be given priority in such sediment removal.

Authorizes an aquatic ecosystem restoration and protection project if the project will improve environmental quality, is in the public interest, and is cost-effective. Provides cost limitations and funding for such projects.

Amends the Water Resources Development Act of 1992 to select a disposal method that is not the least-cost option if the incremental costs are reasonable in relation to the environmental benefits.

Directs increased emphasis on, and opportunities for recreation at, projects operated, constructed, or maintained by the Corps of Engineers.

Sets forth provisions regarding construction of flood control projects by non-Federal interests, including reimbursement and credit of the non-Federal interest under specified circumstances. Directs agreements with non-Federal interests for the development of specified flood control projects in California and Texas.

Authorizes surveys, plans, and studies and to prepare reports that may lead to work in encouraging innovative and environmentally sound engineering and environmental solutions to civil works problems of national significance.

Amends the Water Resources Development Act of 1988 to require the Secretary to provide appropriate protections for a specified period against the dissemination of information developed as the result of a research or development activity conducted by the Corps that is likely to be subject to a cooperative research and development (R&D) agreement within two years after its development and which would be considered a trade secret or privileged or confidential information if obtained from a non-Federal party participating in a cooperative R&D agreement.

Amends existing law to set forth the National Dam Safety Program Act. Requires Federal Emergency Management Agency (FEMA) and the National Dam Safety Review Board (established under this Act) to establish and maintain a coordinated national dam safety program. Requires the FEMA to implement a dam safety improvements implementation plan, provide assistance to States for dam safety programs, and provide training for dam safety. Authorizes a National Dam Safety Review Board. Authorizes appropriations to FEMA for the programs, training, and research authorized under this section.

Authorizes actions to increase the efficiency of energy production or the capacity of hydroelectric power generating facilities.

Authorizes additional capacity at a dredged material disposal facility as long as the non-Federal interest agrees to pay all costs associated with the construction of the additional capacity.

Increases authorized penalties for the obstruction of navigable waters of the United States.

Increases the small project authorization under the Rivers and Harbors Act of 1946.

Amends the Flood Control Act of 1970 to prohibit the inclusion of certain uneconomical cost-sharing requirements in flood control agreements.

Amends the Water Resources Development Act of 1974 to increase the authorized assistance to States for project planning.

Amends the Flood Control Act of 1969 to increase from US$3 to $5 million the per project reimbursement limitation for flood control projects.

Amends the Rivers and Harbors Act of 1958 to include the control and eradication of the melaleuca tree within a program for the control of aquatic plant growth.

Includes the development of one or more sediment decontamination technologies as a project purpose under the Water Resources Development Act of 1992.

Adds to the purposes of Federal shore protection provisions the protection, restoration, and enhancement of sandy beaches on a comprehensive and coordinated basis by the Federal Government, States, localities, and private enterprises. Authorizes the Secretary to establish and conduct a national shoreline erosion control development and demonstration program for six years after the availability of funds for such program.

Directs considering as commercial navigation benefits the economic benefits generated by cruise ships. Directs measures to preserve and enhance scenic and aesthetic qualities in the vicinity of such projects.

Amends the Water Resources Development Act of 1990 to terminate a technical advisory committee for reservoir monitoring.

== Title III: Project-Related Provisions ==
Provides for modifications to specified flood control, navigation, beach erosion control, hurricane damage prevention, and streambank restoration projects in Alabama, Arizona, Arkansas and Missouri, California, Connecticut, Georgia, Illinois, Indiana, Kansas, Louisiana, Maryland, Michigan, Minnesota, Nebraska, New Jersey, New Mexico, North Carolina, New York and New Jersey, North Dakota, Ohio, Oklahoma, Oregon and Washington, Pennsylvania, Puerto Rico, Rhode Island, Texas, Utah, Virginia, Washington, West Virginia, Wisconsin, and Wyoming.

Reauthorizes specified projects for flood control, navigation, wetlands research, and hurricane-flood protection and beach erosion control in Arkansas, Illinois, Michigan, Minnesota, and New Jersey.

Deauthorizes a portion or all of specified navigation projects in Connecticut, Maine, Massachusetts, New Hampshire, New York, Ohio, Rhode Island, and Wisconsin.

Directs a credit to Louisiana toward its non-Federal share of the cost of the Mississippi River Delta Region project.

== Title IV: Studies ==
Requires

- a report on rural sanitation projects in Alaska
- credit toward non-Federal cost share a study of projects in Arizona
- plans and studies for various projects review in California
- completing a limited reevaluation of the authorized St. Louis Harbor Project in the vicinity of the Chain Rocks Canal, Illinois
- specified environmental impact assistance to Illinois
- investigation of potential solutions to flooding and related problems in South Dakota.

Directs feasibility studies with respect to projects in Arkansasm California, Indiana, Michigan New York, Oregon, and Texas.

Directs specified studies of

- flooding in Arizona
- fish and wildlife habitat improvement measures in California
- acquiring land in California for environmental mitigation and flood control purposes
- flood damage and reduction, water supply, and other water resources in the Savannah River Basin
- water infrastructure of specified drainage districts in Illinois
- restoring wetlands and lakes in Indiana
- environmental, flood control, and navigation impacts of the construction of a navigation lock in Louisiana
- wetland restoration and erosion control in Nevada
- flooding in New Hampshire
- a greenway trail project in New York
- the navigation needs at the Port of New York-New Jersey
- flooding in Ohio and Virginia

Requires certain environmental studies with respect to land use in California, Indiana, and South Carolina.

Directs specified reconnaissance studies for in Florida water reuse, channel improvements near in Nevada, and secondary channels of rivers in New York.

Authorizes navigation studies in the Pacific region of American Samoa, Guam, and the Northern Mariana Islands.

Directs the Secretary of the Army and the Secretary of the Interior to evaluate procedures and requirements used in the selection and approval of materials used in the restoration and nourishment of beaches.

== Title V: Miscellaneous Provisions ==
Provides for Federal land conveyances in Alabama, California, Ohio, Oklahoma, Oregon, Texas, and Washington. Redefines the Federal lands to be included as Columbia River Treaty fishing access sites for specified Native American Indian tribes.

Designates specified visitors centers, lakes, and locks and dams in California, Kentucky, Indiana, Louisiana, Mississippi, Tennessee, and Pennsylvania.

Authorizes technical, planning, and design assistance to non-Federal interests for carrying out watershed management, restoration and development, greenway, and environmental assistance projects at specified locations in Arizona, California, Georgia, Nebraska, Pennsylvania, Indiana, New York, Ohio, Oklahoma, Rhode Island, Massachusetts, and West Virginia.

Amends the Water Resources Development Act of 1986

- to increase the authorization of appropriations for a Corps feasibility study for the conservation of fish and wildlife in various geographical areas.
- Includes Virginia as part of a Chesapeake Bay study under such Act.
- to include additional lakes in New York and Illinois within a lakes restoration program.

Amends the Water Resources Development Act of 1990 to authorize specified assistance to nongovernmental entities in the development and implementation of remedial action plans.

Amends the Water Resources Development Act of 1992 to

- change funding and appropriations authorize appropriations for specified environmental infrastructure construction projects
- to require the Special Area Management Plan for the Hackensack Meadowlands area, New Jersey, for the acquisition of significant wetlands.
- to revise project sharing costs with respect to the Broad Top Region of Pennsylvania.

Directs

- periodic beach nourishment for 50 years at specified projects (subject to periodic review of need) in Florida, Georgia, New Jersey, and New York; and
- design and construction assistance to non-Federal interests for specified projects in Ohio, Pennsylvania, and Virginia.

Requires under specified conditions,

- the maintenance of specified navigation channels in California, Louisiana, Mississippi, Rhode Island, Texas, and Washington;
- a pilot program to provide environmental assistance to non-Federal interests in the Chesapeake Bay watershed
- accelerate R&D activities for developing innovative technologies for improving survival of salmon.

Directs an assessment of the general condition of confined disposal facilities on the Great Lakes.

Extends the geographic jurisdiction of the Mississippi River Commission.

Directs promoting Federal, non-Federal, and private sector cooperation in creating public recreation opportunities and supporting infrastructure at Corps of Engineers' projects.

Authorizes specified assistance to non-Federal interests for wastewater treatment and related facilities in Alabama.

Directs an agreement with Heber Springs, Arkansas, to provide specified water supply storage in Greers Ferry Lake in Arkansas.

Authorizes technical assistance to non-Federal interests for reclamation and water quality projects in California.

Directs design and construction of shoreline protection measures for the coastline adjacent to the Faulkner Island Lighthouse, Connecticut.

Directs a comprehensive plan for restoring, preserving, and protecting the South Florida ecosystem. Establishes the South Florida Ecosystem Restoration Task Force.

Authorizes a program to provide environmental assistance to non-Federal interests in southern and eastern Kentucky.

Amends the Coastal Wetlands Planning, Protection, and Restoration Act to provide the 1996 and 1997 Federal share of the cost of certain coastal wetlands restoration projects in Louisiana.

Directs engineering, design, and construction of projects for flood control and improvements in specified areas of Louisiana and Montana.

Directs

- Expediting of the Assateague Island, Maryland and Virginia, restoration project
- transfer of funds to Maryland for an access road to William Jennings Randolph Lake
- and other projects in Maryland.

Authorizes assistance for the restoration of the Chesapeake and Ohio Canal and for reclamation and water quality protection projects in Maryland, Pennsylvania, Ohio, Pennsylvania, New York, and West Virginia.

Directs

- specified projects in Michigan, Pennsylvania, Virginia, and North Carolina for the control of aquatic growth in lakes and rivers
- alternative methods for the decontamination and disposal of dredged material in Minnesota
- assisting the Minnesota Lake Superior Center authority in the construction of an educational facility
- a study and strategy for reducing flood damage, improving water quality, and creating wildlife habitat in Minnesota
- and specified projects in Mississippi.

Prohibits certain counties located at the confluence of the Missouri and Mississippi Rivers from having their participation in the national flood insurance program revoked or suspended due to raising levees along an alignment approved by the relevant circuit court.

Authorizes capital improvements to the New York State Canal System.

Directs a study for shoreline protection in New York.

Authorizes specified projects for dredged material containment facilities in New York, New Jersey, Rhode Island, and Tennessee.

Declares a specified portion of Long Island City in New York, as nonnavigable waters of the United States, requiring improvements to such area.

Directs revisions to the water control manuals for the Jamestown Dam and Pipestem Dam in North Dakota.

Authorizes specified projects for flood control in Pennsylvania, Rhode Island, Tennessee, Virginia, West Virginia, Montana, and Washington.

Amends the Marine Protection, Research, and Sanctuaries Act of 1972 to add permit requirements with respect to site designations for the dumping of dredged, chemical, radioactive, and other materials.

Amends the Federal Water Pollution Control Act to extend through FY 2001 the authorization of appropriations for the Office of the Management Conference of the Long Island Sound Study.

== Title VI: Extension of Expenditure Authority Under Harbor Maintenance Trust Fund ==
Amends the Internal Revenue Code to extend expenditure authority under the Harbor Maintenance Trust Fund.

== See also ==
- Flood Control Act
- Rivers and Harbors Act
