= Water Resources Development Act of 1992 =

The Water Resources Development Act of 1992 (WRDA 1992), Pub. L. 102–580, was enacted by Congress of the United States on October 31, 1992. Most of the provisions of WRDA 1992 are administered by the United States Army Corps of Engineers.

== Title I: Water Resources Projects ==
Authorizes public works projects in the following locations for improvements to navigation, flood control, ecosystem restoration, and beach erosion control and hurricane protection: Alaska, Arkansas, California, Colorado, Delaware, New Jersey, Pennsylvania, Florida, Georgia, South Carolina, Louisiana, Massachusetts, Nevada, North Carolina, Puerto Rico, Texas, and Virginia.

Modifies projects at the following locations with respect to wildlife mitigation, flood control, beach erosion control and hurricane protection, navigation, and other improvements:, Alabama, Mississippi, California, Illinois, Kentucky, Missouri, Louisiana, Maryland, Massachusetts, Minnesota, Nebraska, New Jersey, New York, New Mexico, Oklahoma, Pennsylvania, Oregon, Rhode Island, Texas, Virginia, Washington, West Virginia, and Wisconsin.

Amends the Water Resources Development Act of 1986 to authorize a contract with the St. Johns River Water Management District and the Southwest Florida Water Management District for the continued operation and maintenance of portions of the Cross Florida barge canal project.

Authorizes

- visitor centers at Melvin Price Lock and Dam, Alton, Illinois, Mt. Morris Dam, New York, Northeastern New Jersey Regional Flood Operations-Response, Engineering, and Visitor Center, and at the John Hammerschmidt Lake, Arkansas River, Arkansas
- the Lower Mississippi River Museum and Riverfront Interpretive Site, Vicksburg, Mississippi. Directs consultation with the Smithsonian Institution in the planning and design of the museum and site and with the Department of the Interior and the National Park Service in the planning, design, and implementation of interpretive programs.

Authorizes studies and small navigation projects in Louisiana, Massachusetts, Minnesota, New York, Virginia, Indiana, Pennsylvania, Texas, and St. Thomas, Virgin Islands.

Directs a Sonoma Baylands wetland demonstration project in the San Francisco Bay-Delta estuary, California.

Sets forth funding limitations, constraints, transfers, obligations on various projects.

Directs construction of a research and quarantine facility in Florida, to be used in connection with efforts to control Melaleuca and other exotic plant species that threaten native ecosystems in Florida.

Authorizes navigation access to, and berthing areas at, all currently operating public and private commercial dock facilities associated with or having access to the Federal navigation project on the Columbia, Snake, and Clearwater Rivers.

Directs a study for a streambank and shoreline protection project for Anaheim, California.

Directs design, land acquisition, and construction of the Montgomery Point Lock and Dam on the White River, Arkansas.

Authorizes a study for the purpose of determining whether there is contaminated ground water flowing downstream from and through existing Federal facilities at Whittier Narrows Dam, Los Angeles County, California.

Directs completion of general, feasibility, navigation, and other studies, design memorandum, economic reevaluations, in the following states: California, Florida, Iowa, Louisiana, Massachusetts, Michigan, Mississippi, New Jersey, New York, Oklahoma, Virginia, Texas, and West Virginia.

Directs a comprehensive assessment of adverse impacts to such watershed from Federal facilities, review current plans for reducing such adverse impacts, and carry out a feasibility study to identify and recommend measures for implementation to eliminate such adverse impacts.

Continues the authorization for projects and studies (for flood control and other purposes) in Iowa, Louisiana, Missouri, New Jersey, Pennsylvania, and Texas.

Deauthorizes navigation projects at the following locations: (1) Boothbay Harbor, Maine; (2) Boston Inner Harbor Channel, Massachusetts; (3) Newburyport, Massachusetts; (4) Greilickville, Michigan; (5) South Haven Harbor, Michigan; and (6) Sag Harbor, New York. Deauthorizes a portion of the Canaveral Harbor project, Florida.

Provides gratuitous political, by-name designation for the following structures:

- Lock and dam 3, Arkansas River, Arkansas, as the "Joe Hardin Lock and Dam"
- The Greers Ferry Lake Visitors Center, Arkansas, as the "William Carl Garner Visitors Center"
- The reservoir created by the James W. Trimble Lock and Dam on the Arkansas River, Arkansas, as the "John Paul Hammerschmidt Lake"
- Lock 5 on the Red River Waterway, Louisiana, as the "Joe D. Waggonner, Jr. Lock"
- The area for which environmental and other stream bank restoration measures are authorized relating to the project for flood control, Passaic River Mainstem, New Jersey and New York, as the "Joseph G. Minish Passaic River Waterfront Park and Historic Area"
- The project for flood control, Buena Vista, Virginia, as the "James R. Olin Flood Control Project"
- The Gallipolis Locks and Dam, Ohio River, Ohio and West Virginia, as the "Robert C. Byrd Locks and Dam"
- The Mill Creek Reservoir, Washington, as the "Virgil B. Bennington Lake"

== Title II: Generally Applicable Provisions ==
Amends the Water Resources Development Act of 1986 to modify requirements concerning the ability of non-Federal interests to pay under cost-sharing agreements. Directs a review of regulations on ability to pay in light of locally prevailing conditions such as those associated with specified projects; and amends the regulations to the extent necessary to more appropriately account for locally prevailing conditions that would limit the ability of local interests to participate as non-Federal project sponsors in accordance with established cost-sharing formulas.

Prohibits project modifications for improvements of the environment without specific congressional authorization if the estimated cost exceeds $5 million.

Authorizes appropriation of not to exceed $25 million (currently, $15 million) annually to carry out provisions related to such modifications.

Authorizes accepting contributions for environmental and recreation projects, with funds received to be deposited into a specified account in the Treasury; and projects for the protection, restoration, and creation of aquatic and ecologically related habitats in connection with dredging of an authorized navigation project.

Extends specified State safety and training, research, and dam inventory programs.

Authorizes assistance to non-Federal interests for the repair, reconstruction, or other modification to Mussers Dam, Middle Creek, Snyder County, Pennsylvania.

Specifies that all costs incurred in carrying out the project to correct seepage problems at Beaver Lake, Arkansas, shall be treated as costs incurred for a dam safety project, subject to cost-sharing requirements of the Water Resources Development Act of 1986.

Authorizes materials necessary to promote the Corps safety program, for distribution to Corps employees, and to recognize outstanding safety performance by such employees. Authorizes appropriations.

Directs making use of private sector resources in carrying out surveying and mapping activities in the Corps' Civil Works Program, ensuring that procurement with funds appropriated to carry out this Act are conducted in compliance with the Buy American Act.

Directs a study on the need for changes in Federal law and policy with respect to dredged material disposal areas for the construction and maintenance of harbors and inland harbors by the Secretary.

Authorizes assistance to non-Federal interests for carrying out specified projects for the beneficial reuse of waste water, including several specified places in California.

Authorizes design and construction assistance to the Santa Clara Valley Water District and to the city of San Jose, California to demonstrate and field test for innovative public use processes that advance the technology of waste water reuse and treatment and promote use of treated waste water for critical water supply purposes and protection of fish and wildlife in the San Francisco Bay.

Authorizes assistance to non-Federal interests to carry out water-related environmental infrastructure and resource protection and development projects relating to wastewater treatment and for other purposes in Washington D.C., Maryland, Georgia, Kentucky, Michigan, Mississippi, New Hampshire, New Jersey, New York, Pennsylvania, Virginia, and along the U.S.-Mexican border.

Authorizes design and construction assistance in Arkansas and New York.

Provides for the termination of the Board of Engineers for Rivers and Harbors; the Board was originally created in 1902 by President Theodore Roosevelt to determine the feasibility of developing riverine projects.

Authorizes a program to share the cost of managing recreation facilities and natural resources at water resource development projects.

Requires debarment of persons convicted of intentionally affixing a label bearing a "Made in America" inscription to any product sold in or shipped to the United States that is not made in the United States and is used in a civil works project from contracting with the Federal Government for a period of from three to five years.

== Title III: Miscellaneous Provisions ==
Extends the jurisdiction of the Mississippi River Commission.

Directs a prevention monitoring program for zebra mussels throughout the New York City water supply system. Amends the Nonindigenous Aquatic Nuisance Prevention and Control Act of 1990 to direct the Coast Guard to issue regulations to prevent the introduction and spread of aquatic nuisance species in the Great Lakes through ballast water carried on vessels that, after operating on the waters beyond the exclusive economic zone, enter a U.S. port on the Hudson River north of the George Washington Bridge.

Authorizes a cooperative agreement with the Earth Conservancy to develop, and carry out along the Susquehanna River between Wilkes-Barre and Sunbury, Pennsylvania, a wetlands demonstration project.

Directs a cooperative agreement with non-Federal interests to develop and carry out along the Juniata River and its tributaries, Pennsylvania, a watershed reclamation and protection and wetlands creation and restoration project.

Authorizes boat ramps in Georgia and trailhead facilities in West Virginia.

Authorizes design and construction projects to address water quality problems Louisiana, New York, Maine, and Rhode Island.

Directs studies of Baltimore Harbor, Maryland, for the purpose of developing analytical procedures and criteria for contaminated dredged material in order to distinguish those materials that should be placed in containment sites from those that could be used in beneficial projects or placed in open waters without being chemically altered, and of determining the feasibility and necessity of decontaminating dredged materials and of dewatering and recycling such materials for use as marketable products.

Requires a study of the economic benefits of Federal and significant non-Federal shore protection activities in the Mid-Atlantic region from New York to Virginia.

Authorizes a memorandum of understanding between the Army and the U.S. Department of Agriculture to study problems associated with flooding in Mississippi.

Authorizes review of documents of the Chief of Engineers pertaining to Orchard Beach, Bronx, New York, and to make appropriate recommendations concerning storm damage prevention, recreation, environmental restoration, and other purposes; and a study on the need for erosion protection along the East River, New York, in the vicinity of Brooklyn, Queens, and Manhattan, with a view toward mitigating the deleterious effects of drift removal on protecting the adjacent shoreline from erosion. Authorizes appropriations.

Authorizes a reconnaissance and feasibility study of remediation of contaminated sediments in Lake Champlain and the Narrows of Lake Champlain, Vermont; (2) of providing additional boat access points on Lake Champlain, Vermont; and (2) on providing additional flood protection for Montpelier, Vermont.

Directs the feasibility study of Federal improvements to the St. John's River Channel, Florida, to examine the commercial and military uses of the channel in those areas traversed by both military and commercial vessels, and coordinate the Secretary's efforts with the Navy to use available studies and resources that project future military dredging needs in the St. John's River Channel.

Requires the Chief of Engineers to review the report on central and southern Florida, and other pertinent reports, with a view to determining whether modifications to the existing project are advisable at the present time due to significantly changed physical, biological, demographic, or economic conditions.

Amends the Water Resources Development Act of 1988 to authorize payomg tuition expenses of suitable, English-taught primary and secondary education in Puerto Rico for the children of Federal employees who are employed (currently, temporarily residing and employed) in Puerto Rico.

Directs dam drawdown mitigation, risk, and design deficiency studies in Washington. West Virginia, and California.

Requires a pilot program for providing environmental restoration infrastructure and resource protection development projects to non-Federal interests in south central Pennsylvania, subject to specified (including reporting) requirements.

Authorizes capital improvements to the Illinois and Michigan Canal and rehabilitate, renovate, preserve, and maintain the Illinois and Michigan Canal and its related facilities.

Directs dredging and transfer studies in California, Maryland, and Virginia.

Directs a plan for modifying projects in Kentucky and Pennsylvania

Authorizes study for developing and preserving seasonal wetlands in California and a water resources project Arizona.

Directs reviewing water supply needs in Ohio.

Authorizes assistance for the development of Environmental Improvement Programsin New Jersey.

Authorizes real estate and facility (e.g., locks and dam) transfers, conveyances, and other actions in Georgia, Wisconsin, Arkansas, New Jersey, and Michigan.

Requires a study of a hydro-environmental monitoring and information system in the New York Bight and Harbor and a national study on information that is currently available on contaminated sediments.

Authorizes completion of a study on contaminated sediments in Wisconsin.

Directs planning, design, and construction of a navigation project in New York and New Jersey.

Authorizes the Secretary to: (1) conduct investigations and surveys of the watersheds of the rivers in the Conemaugh River Basin, Pennsylvania; and (2) develop and implement restoration projects for abatement and mitigation of water quality degradation caused by abandoned mines and mining activity in such basin.

Declares portions of Cuyahoga County, Ohio, to be non-navigable waters of the United States, subject to specified limitations.

Authorizes the Secretary to: (1) use available resources to support the logistical and minor construction needs of the local organizing committee of the 1993 World University Games in western New York; and (2) undertake a program to control nuisance aquatic vegetation for the purpose of preserving the recreational uses of the waters of Lake Gaston, Virginia and North Carolina (and authorizes appropriations).

Directs the Secretary to establish a pilot program for providing water-related environmental assistance to non-Federal interests in southern West Virginia, subject to specified (including reporting) requirements. Authorizes appropriations.

Authorizes the Tennessee Valley Authority (TVA) to establish the Tennessee River Heritage Museum and Education Facility to encourage science and technology as it relates to developing, managing, and preserving rivers as a nationally significant resource.

Requires the Comptroller General to review the operation of the project for flood control, Red Rock Dam and Lake, Iowa, authorized by the Flood Control Act of 1938.

Directs crediting specified flood control projects in California for various special expenditures not otherwise authorized under the Water Resources Development Act of 1986

Requires a study on bank stabilization and marsh creation in Louisiana.

Directs salt marsh restoration projects in Connecticut.

Authorizes the Secretary to participate as an active Federal member in the Memorandum of Understanding for the Interagency Ecological Study Program for implementation of the monitoring requirements in the San Francisco Bay-Delta Estuary, California.

Amends the Water Resources Development Act of 1988 to authorize a comprehensive flood warning and response system in Pennsylvania at full Federal expense.

Authorizes the Secretary to construct, establish, equip, maintain, and operate (or assist in doing so) an interagency child care facility at Fort Point, Galveston, Texas, to provide child care services for children of Federal employees. Sets forth provisions regarding the establishment of fees for such services, transfers of funds from Federal agencies in connection with such facility, and the Secretary's authority to accept donations. Authorizes appropriations.

Authorizes and directs the Secretary to offer technical assistance to the National Park Service (NPS) on infrastructure repairs and improvements at the Presidio of San Francisco, California, during the transition period from Army to NPS management and after its inclusion into the Golden Gate National Recreation Area.

Requires the Secretary to assist the NPS in identifying opportunities at the Presidio for demonstration and education programs of environmentally suitable and innovative technologies, and make available a liaison from its Construction Engineering Research Laboratory for such purpose.

Directs the Secretary to develop a comprehensive five- and 20-year sediment management strategy for the Maumee River, Toledo Harbor, which may include a combination of several sediment disposal alternatives and shall emphasize innovative, environmentally benign alternatives, including reuse and recycling for wetland restoration. Authorizes the Secretary to conduct the engineering and construction activities necessary to implement the five-year sediment management strategy. Authorizes appropriations.

Amends the Water Resources Development Act of 1990 to repeal an authorization of appropriations for the relocation of the Southeast Light on Block Island, Rhode Island.

Authorizes reconstruction of the Allendale Dam in North Providence, Rhode Island, subject to specified cost, cost-sharing, and other requirements.

Directs a water supply contract with the Ouachita River Water District for withdrawals from Lake DeGray, Arkansas, as provided in the agreement forwarded by the Vicksburg District Corps of Engineers dated March 1992.

Authorizes

- remove a sunken barge from waters off the shore of the Narragansett Town Beach in Narragansett, Rhode Island
- construct two elevated water storage towers at Quonset Point-Davisville, Rhode Island
- relocate 6,000 feet (1,800 m) of sewer lines to West Davisville, Rhode Island
- undertake the repair and reconstruction of a flood wall system at Stillwater, Minnesota

Amends the Federal Water Pollution Control Act to provide that the Environmental Protection Agency or the State shall not require a permit for stormwater discharges; and not later than October 1, 1993 (currently, 1992) the EPA shall issue regulations that designate certain storm water discharges to be regulated to protect water quality and establish a comprehensive program to regulate such designated sources.

== Title IV: Infrastructure Technology, Research and Development ==
Authorizes activities to inform the U.S. maritime industry and port authorities of technological innovations abroad that could significantly improve waterborne transportation in the United States.

Authorizes studies on the dredging needs of the national ports and harbors of the United States.

Deauthorizes the responsibility of the Federal Government to maintain and operate a 1,400-foot (430 m) earthen dike constructed by local interests in lieu of a 1,400-foot (430 m) steel sheetpile breakwater authorized as part of the Flushing Bay and Creek, New York, project by the River and Harbor Act of 1962.

Authorizes and directs a data collection and monitoring program of coastal processes for the Atlantic Coast of New York.

Directs the Administrator and the Secretary: (1) within a year, based upon a review of decontamination technologies identified pursuant to the Water Resources Development Act of 1990, to jointly select removal, pretreatment, post-treatment, and decontamination technologies for contaminated marine sediments for a decontamination project in the New York/New Jersey Harbor.

== Other Acts under Public Law 102-580 ==
Title V is the National Contaminated Sediment Assessment and Management Act, which Establishes a National Contaminated Sediment Task Force. Sets forth provisions regarding the duties and compensation of the Task Force. Sets forth reporting requirements.

Directs the EPA to: (1) conduct a comprehensive national survey of data regarding aquatic sediment quality in the United States; and (2) compile all existing information on the quantity, chemical and physical composition, and geographic location of pollutants in aquatic sediment, including the probable source of such pollutants and identification of contaminated sediments. Sets forth reporting requirements.

Requires the EPA to conduct a comprehensive and continuing program to assess aquatic sediment quality. Sets forth reporting requirements.

Amends the Marine Protection, Research, and Sanctuaries Act of 1972 to revise provisions regarding: (1) ocean dumping requirements (including the addition of a requirement that the Secretary, prior to issuing a permit, obtain the concurrence by the Administrator and the establishment of related procedures); (2) restrictions on States' rights to adopt or enforce requirements respecting ocean dumping (eases such restrictions under specified circumstances); (3) the designation of sites for dumping; (4) permit conditions; and (5) ocean dumping penalties.

Spells out various reporting requirements.

== See also ==
- Flood Control Act
- Rivers and Harbors Act
