= Water Resources Development Act of 1988 =

Water Resources Development Act of 1988 (WRDA 1988), Pub. L. 100–676, is a public law passed by Congress on November 17, 1988 concerning water resources in the United States in the areas of flood control, navigation, dredging, environment, recreation, water supply, beach nourishment and erosion.

Many of the provisions of the act are administered by the Secretary of the Army through the United States Army Corps of Engineers.

== Projects ==
WRDA 1988 authorized specified public works projects at the following locations: (1) flood control, Lower Mission Creek, Santa Barbara, California; (2) navigation, Ft. Pierce Harbor, Florida; (3) beach erosion control, Nassau County (Amelia Island), Florida; (4) navigation, Port Sutton Channel, Florida; (5) flood control, Chicagoland Underflow Plan, Illinois; (6) navigation, Lower Ohio River, Illinois and Kentucky; (7) flood control, Hazard, Kentucky; (8) navigation, Wolf and Jordan Rivers and Bayou Portage, Mississippi; (9) flood control, Truckee Meadows, Nevada; (10) flood control, Scioto River, West Columbus, Ohio; (11) navigation, Delaware River, Philadelphia to Wilmington, Pennsylvania and Delaware; (12) flood control, Cypress Creek, Texas; (13) flood control Falfurrias, Texas; (14) navigation, Guadalupe River to Victoria, Texas; (15) flood control, McGrath Creek, Wichita Falls, Texas; and (16) environmental enhancement, Mississippi and Louisiana Estuarine Areas.

Directed measures to alleviate bank erosion and related problems associated with reservoir releases along the Missouri River between Fort Peck Dam, Montana, and Gavins Point Dam, South Dakota and Nebraska. Required the cost of such measures to be apportioned among project purposes as a joint-use operation and maintenance expense. Permits the Secretary to acquire interests in affected areas from willing sellers.

== Amendment to WRDA 1986 ==
It amended the Water Resources Development Act of 1986 (WRDA 1986) to extend its cost sharing and cost ceiling provisions to all water resources projects enacted after the date of enactment of such Act. It also amended WRDA 1986 to require that the Federal share of the cost of the project for Indiana shoreline erosion be determined in accordance with title I of such Act. It also amended WRDA 1986 to provide that the flood control project for Root River Basin, Minnesota does not affect the authority of the Secretary to carry out a small project under the Flood Control Act of 1948.

It required the Soil Conservation Service to cooperate in the Beaver Lake Water quality project in Arkansas. Directed use of available funds to continue planning and design for such project, including plans for individual parcels of land within the drainage basis which contribute to water quality degradation and impairment of water supply uses at Beaver Lake.

Amended WRDA 1986 to provide for crediting utility relocation costs of harbor construction borne by non-Federal interests toward the additional ten percent payment they are assessed for the cost of general navigation features of a project over 30 years.

Amended WRDA 1986 to deauthorize the water resources projects at: (1) Rockland Lake, Texas; (2) White River, Batesville, Arkansas; (3) Algoma, Wisconsin (outer harbor); and (4) the Chicago River Turning Basin, Chicago Harbor, Illinois.

Amended WRDA 1986 to extend from two years to five years the authority of the Secretary to carry out a demonstration program to modify water projects to improve the environment.

== Flood Control ==
It modified the project for flood control, West Memphis and vicinity, Arkansas, to provide that non-Federal cooperation for such project may be provided by private individuals, private organizations, levee districts, drainage districts, or any unit of a State, country, or local government.

Modified the project for flood control at Redwood River, Marshall, Minnesota, to authorize construction of the project in accordance with a specified memorandum and at increased costs.

Modified the flood control project, Roseau River, Minnesota, to direct construction of a flood control levee near Duxby, Minnesota.

Authorized services to the non-Federal project sponsor in the design and the construction of upstream and downstream non-Federal extensions to the Federal project for flood control, Brush Creek and Tributaries, Missouri and Kansas if the non-Federal sponsor provides funds, in advance, to cover all costs of such services. Provides that such extensions shall not be considered part of the Federal project.

Modified the project for Libby Dam, Lake Koocanusa Reservoir, Montana, to authorize alleviation of the low water impact on existing facilities at such project and to provide additional planned public recreation sites along the reservoir. Directed protection of Indian archaeological sites at such project. Required coordination with the Kootenai Tribes in protecting such sites and facilitating curation.

Modified the project for flood control, Wyoming Valley, Pennsylvania, to authorize construction of an inflatable dam on the Susquehanna River in the Wilkes Barre area, Pennsylvania.

Modified the project for Wynoochee Lake, Wynoochee River, Washington, authorized under the Flood Control Act of 1962, to permit the city of Aberdeen, Washington, to operate, maintain, repair, and rehabilitate such project after September 30, 1988. Sets forth terms and conditions and other administrative provisions if the Secretary grants the city permission to proceed.

Required an opportunity for public review and comment before any changes are made in the operation of any reservoir which will result in or require a reallocation of storage space in such reservoir or will significantly affect any project purpose.

Reauthorized the flood control project at Lakeport Lake, California.

Amended the Flood Control Act of 1968 to change the reimbursement limitation per project to $3,000,000 or one percent to the total project cost, whichever, is greater, except that the amount of actual Federal reimbursement, including reductions in contributions, may not exceed $5,000,000 in any fiscal year.

Authorized, in cooperation with other Federal agencies and the Susquehanna River Basin Commission, to design and implement a comprehensive flood warning and response system to serve communities and flood prone areas along the Juniata River and tributaries in Pennsylvania to demonstrate the effectiveness of such systems and to evaluate their costs. Authorized appropriations for such project.

== Navigation ==
Authorized construction of the breakwaters to a greater height at the project at King Harbor, Redondo Beach, California, if recommended in a report of the Chief of Engineers.

Modified the navigation project for Los Angeles and Long Beach Harbors, San Pedro Bay, California, to provide that if non-Federal interests carry out any work associated with such project which is later recommended by the Chief of Engineers and approved by the Secretary, the Secretary may reimburse such non-Federal interests an amount equal to the Federal share of the costs, without interest.

Modified the navigation project at Annapolis Harbor, Maryland, to realign the channel in such project to promote more efficient mooring operations.

Authorized paying for the remaining cost for the navigation project for Deal Island, Maryland (Lower Thorofare).

Modified the navigation project at Gulfport Harbor, Mississippi, to alter the methods by which the Secretary, during construction of the project, may carry out a demonstration program to evaluate the costs and benefits of thin layer disposal in the Mississippi Sound of dredged material. Directed, during construction of the project, a demonstration program to evaluate the costs and benefits of thin layer disposal in the Mississippi Sound of dredged material from construction harbor improvements and to determine whether there are unacceptable adverse effects from such disposal. Required a report to the Congress and the Environmental Protection Agency (EPA) within one year of completion of the demonstration program. Provides for the EPA to approve or disapprove the report. Required a study team to assist in planning, carrying out, monitoring, and reporting on the program.

Increased the ceiling costs for the navigation project for the Blair and Sitcum Waterways, Washington.

Directed the study and report on cost recovery options and alternative methods of financing navigational improvements on the Great Lakes connecting channels and Saint Lawrence Seaway, including modernization of the Eisenhower and Snell Locks of the Saint Lawrence Seaway.

Authorized emergency repairs as necessary to preserve the existing dike at the Small Boat Harbor, Buffalo Harbor, New York, at a specified cost.

Directed maintenance of water levels in the Mississippi River headwaters reservoirs at specified limits.

Amended the Water Resources Development Act of 1986 to declare certain portions of the Delaware River in Philadelphia County, Pennsylvania, as nonnavigable.

Declared as nonnavigable certain portions of Coney Island Creek and Gravesend Bay, New York, and specified bodies of water in Ridgefield, New Jersey, as nonnavigable.

Declared that the following navigation projects shall remain authorized after December 31, 1989: (1) Monterey Harbor, California; (2) the north branch of the Chicago River, Illinois; (3) certain elements of the Missouri River Basin project; and (4) James River, Virginia.

== Dredging ==
Directed maintenance dredging of the Federal project at the mouth of the Los Angeles River, California, to an authorized depth to maintain the flood control basin and navigation safety.

Authorized dredging of the Hearding Island Inlet, Duluth Harbor, Minnesota, to increase water circulation and reduce stagnant water conditions.

Amended the Rivers and Harbors Act of 1970 to authorize continued deposition of dredged materials into a contained spoil disposal facility in the Great Lakes until such facility is no longer needed or that it is completely full. Required a study and monitoring program to determine whether toxic pollutants are present in such facilities and to determine the concentration levels of such pollutants. Required an inspection and monitoring program to determine whether toxic pollutants are leaking from such facilities.

Required the Environmental Protection Agency to submit to specified congressional committees the plan for alternative dredge disposal sites to the Mud Dump near Sandy Hook, New Jersey, within 120 days after the date of enactment of this Act.

Amended the Water Resources Development Act of 1974 to revise the project cost ceiling for the New York Harbor drift removal project.

== Environment ==
Modified the demonstration project at Sunset Harbor, California, to wetland restoration as a project purpose.

Modified the project for mitigation of fish and wildlife losses at Stumpy Lake, Louisiana, to: (1) include design and construction of such structural and remedial measures as necessary to control erosion and protect certain valuable environmental resources; and (2) authorize the Secretary to spend certain funds in participation with Louisiana on design, construction, and purchase of necessary lands and rights-of-way.

Directed proceeding with work on the Kissimmee River demonstration project, Florida.

Authorized a simulation model of the central and southern Florida hydrologic ecosystem for use in predicting the effects of proposed modifications to the ecosystem.

Modified the project for beach erosion control for Sandy Hook to Barnegat Inlet, New Jersey, to require that the Sandy Hook reach be constructed in accordance with a specified draft general design memorandum, and that periodic beach nourishment over the project life be conducted.

Directed the Interior to study and report on modifying the operation of the Bluestone Lake project, West Virginia, to facilitate the protection and enhancement of biological resources and recreational use of waters downstream from the project.

Directed, before issuing a permit for a proposed municipal landfill in the vicinity of Bartlett, Illinois, a study and report to the Congress on the impact of such landfill on the Newark Valley Aquifer and on the ability of water from the aquifer to dilute for purposes of drinking water supply naturally occurring radium in groundwater.

Required the President, in submitting the FY 1990 budget, to include a schedule for completing the feasibility study on Northern California Streams, American River Watershed, as expeditiously as practicable and an estimate of the resources required to meet such schedule.

Directed, in cooperation with Environmental Protection Agency, a study of the water quality effects of hydroelectric facilities owned and operated by the Corps of Engineers.

Directed a study of the need for an internal drainage system in the Frog Pond agricultural area of Dade County, Florida.

== Recreation ==
Directed the following projects enhance recreation: (1) Beechfork Lake, West Virginia; (2) Bluestone Lake, West Virginia; (3) East Lynn Lake, West Virginia; (4) Francis E. Walter Dam, Pennsylvania; (5) Jennings Randolph Lake, Maryland and West Virginia; (6) R.D. Bailey Lake, West Virginia; (7) Savage River Dam, Maryland; (8) Youghiogheny River Lake, Pennsylvania and Maryland; (9) Summersville Lake, West Virginia; (1) Sutton Lake, West Virginia; and (11) Stonewall Jackson Lake, West Virginia.

Directed restoration of recreational uses established prior to May 1, 1988, or provide comparable recreational uses at the South Pier to Charlevoix Harbor project, Charlevoix, Michigan, in order to mitigate any adverse impact on recreational uses resulting from reconstruction of the South Pier.

== Water Supply ==
Directed a periodic review of the water supply problems related to drought which may be experienced at the Bayou Lafourche water supply reservoir in Louisiana, and to respond as appropriate.

== Beach Nourishment and Erosion ==
Amended the Water Resources Development Act of 1976 to require accommodation of the schedule of any State that requests the placement of beach quality sand.

Directed repairs as required to restore a groin of the Ventura to Pierpont Beach erosion control project to its original configuration.

== Funding and Land Issues ==
Required the Secretary, upon the request of a non-Federal sponsor of a water resources development project, to provide such sponsor with periodic statements of project expenditures.

Required projects for hurricane or storm damage reduction to comply with applicable flood plain requirements.

Allows a Federal Project Repayment District to use any cost-recovery approach that is consistent with State law to satisfy cost-recovery requirements. (Currently, such districts are restricted to cost-recovery through property transfer fees.)

Directed the Comptroller General to review the civil works program of the Corps of Engineers and report to the Congress.

Authorized appropriations for the Des Plaines River Wetlands demonstration project.

Directed the Secretary to include in the feasibility report for the Coyote and Berryessa Creeks, California, project recommendations for reimbursement to local interests for work undertaken by them which is integral to the project.

Authorized conveying specified acreage to the City of South El Monte, California. Authorized, in consideration for such conveyance, acceptance of real property in the Los Angeles area or cash, or both.

Authorized conveying specified land to Illinois in the city of Ottawa.

Authorized exchange of certain lands in Whitman County, Washington, for wildlife mitigation purposes.

Prohibits the Secretary from conveying title to all or any part of the Lesage/Greenbottom Swamp to the State of West Virginia.

Authorized appropriations to establish a Technical Resource Service for the Red River Basin in Minnesota and North Dakota, for purpose of providing technical services for the development and implementation of State and local water and related land resources initiatives.

Amended the Supplemental Appropriations Act of 1984 to extend the authorization of the modified water delivery schedule for the Everglades National Park from January 1, 1989, until January 1, 1992.

== Name Changes ==
Made the following name designations: (1) the Ventura Marina, located in Ventura County, California, as the Ventura Harbor; (2) the harbor on the Mississippi River at Hickman, Kentucky, as the Elvis Stahr Harbor, Port of Hickman; and (3) the boat ramp to be constructed on the Mississippi River in Lauderdale County, Tennessee, as the Ed Jones Boat Ramp.

== Other ==
Directed a study of the need to modernize and upgrade the federally owned and operated hydroelectric power system and report to the Congress with recommendations.

Authorized the Secretary to pay tuition expenses of English-taught primary and secondary education in Puerto Rico for the children of any Federal employee when such expenses are incurred after the date of enactment of this Act and while the employee is temporarily residing and employed in Puerto Rico for the construction of the Portuguese and Bucana Rivers, Puerto Rico, project.

Required the Secretary, when feasible, to promote long- and short-term cost savings, increased efficiency, reliability, safety, and improved environmental results through the use of innovative technology in water resources development projects. Required the Secretary to report to the Congress within two years of enactment of this Act on the use of such technologies.

Authorized a demonstration program for a two-year period to provide technical assistance, on a nonexclusive basis, to any U.S. firm which is competing for, or has been awarded, a contract for the planning, design, or construction of a project outside the United States. Required the firm to: (1) provide funds in advance, to cover the costs of such assistance; (2) certify that such assistance is not otherwise available; and (3) agree to hold and save the United States free from damages due to the planning, design, construction, operation, or maintenance of the project. Sets forth the authority of the Secretary with respect to an invention made by a Federal employee while providing such assistance. Required the firm to protect any confidential information which may be provided. Required the Secretary to report to the Congress on the results of the demonstration program.

Authorized the Secretary, in order to improve the state of engineering and construction in the United States and consistent with the civil works mission of the Army Corps of Engineers, to undertake, on a cost-shared basis, collaborative research and development with non-Federal entities. Authorized appropriations.

Provided for an agreement with a private person for the removal of an abandoned vessel from the waters off Mona Island, Puerto Rico.

Authorized a new division laboratory for the United States Army Engineer Division, Ohio River.

Authorized a water resources management and planning service for the Hudson River Basin in New York and New Jersey. Authorized appropriations.

Amended the Energy and Water Development Appropriation Act of 1988 to correct the description of the portion of the Hudson River, New York, that is not a part of the federally authorized Channel Deepening Project.

== See also ==
- Flood Control Act
- Rivers and Harbors Act
