= Flood Control Act of 1936 =

1936 United States act of Congress to control floods

- Long title: An Act Authorizing the construction of certain public works on rivers and harbors for flood control, and for other purposes.
- Enacted by: the 74th United States Congress
- Effective: June 22, 1936

Citations
- Public law: Public Law 74-738
- Statutes at Large: 49 Stat. 1570

Legislative history
- Introduced in the House as H.R. 8455 by D‑LA Riley J. Wilsonth on June 10, 1935; Committee consideration by House Committee on Flood Control; Passed the House on August 22, 1935 (Voice vote); Passed the Senate on June 3, 1936 (Voice vote); Reported by the joint conference committee on June 1936; agreed to by the House on June 15, 1936 (Agreed to conference report) and by the Senate on June 15, 1936 (Agreed to conference report); Signed into law by President Franklin D. Roosevelt on June 22, 1936

Major amendments
- Flood Control Act of 1938, Flood Control Act of 1944

The Flood Control Act of 1936, Pub. L. 74–738, (FCA 1936) was an Act of the United States Congress signed into law by President Franklin Delano Roosevelt on 22 June 1936. It authorized civil engineering projects such as dams, levees, dikes, and other flood control measures through the United States Army Corps of Engineers and other Federal agencies. It is one of a number of Flood Control Acts passed on a regular basis by the United States Congress. FCA 1936 was introduced in Congress by Riley J. Wilson (D, LA).

FCA 1936 dictated that Federal investigations and improvements of rivers and other waterways for flood control and allied purposes shall be under the jurisdiction of the War Department (precursor of the Department of Defense) under the supervision of the Chief of Engineers. It further put watersheds, waterflow retardation, and soil erosion prevention under the U.S. Department of Agriculture. Further, those authorities were not to interfere with reclamation projects by the Bureau of Reclamation of the Interior Department.

FCA 1936 was part of the profusion of important Depression Era legislation enacted by the 74th Congress in 1935–1936, including the Social Security Act, the National Labor Relations Act, the Banking Act of 1935, the Wealth Tax Act, the Public Utility Holding Company Act, the Rural Electrification Act, the Soil Conservation Service Act, and the $4.8 billion Emergency Relief Appropriation Act of 1935.

== Significance ==
According to Joseph Arnold, author of The Evolution of the Flood Control Act of 1936,

The Flood Control Act of 1936 established an enormous commitment by the federal government to protect people and property on approximately 100 million acres [400,000 km^{2}]. The only limitations on federal flood control projects were that the economic benefits had to exceed the costs, and local interests had to meet the ABC requirements for local projects. Since 1936, Congress has authorized the Corps of Engineers to construct hundreds of miles of levees, flood walls, and channel improvements and approximately 375 major reservoirs. These remarkable engineering projects today comprise one of the largest single additions to the nation's physical plant -rivaled only by the highway system. They have saved billions of dollars in property damage and protected hundreds of thousands of people from anxiety, injury, and death. They stand today as one of the more significant marks of our technical skill and humane spirit.

FCA 1936 declared that flood control was a national priority since floods constituted a menace to the national welfare.

== Authorization ==
FCA 1936 authorized the expenditure of $310 million for flood control projects with no more than $50 million being expended in fiscal year 1937. Expenditure was conditioned on local interests participating by providing all lands, easements, and rights-of-way necessary for the construction of the projects, local interests holding and saving the Federal Government free from damages due to the construction works, and that local interests maintain and operate the projects after completion.

== Projects covered by the Act ==
=== Dams ===
- Kinzua Dam (begun in 1960, completed in 1965)
- Optima Lake Dam (begun in 1966, completed in 1978)
- Summersville Dam
- others

=== Levees ===
- Mississippi River Levee near between Baton Rouge, LA and New Orleans, LA.

== See also ==
For related legislation which sometime also implement flood control provisions, see the following:

- Flood Control Act
- Flood Control Act of 1937 - follow-on legislation
- Water Resources Development Act
- Rivers and Harbors Act
