= Lower Mississippi River Museum =

Coordinates: 32.35347°N 90.88185°W

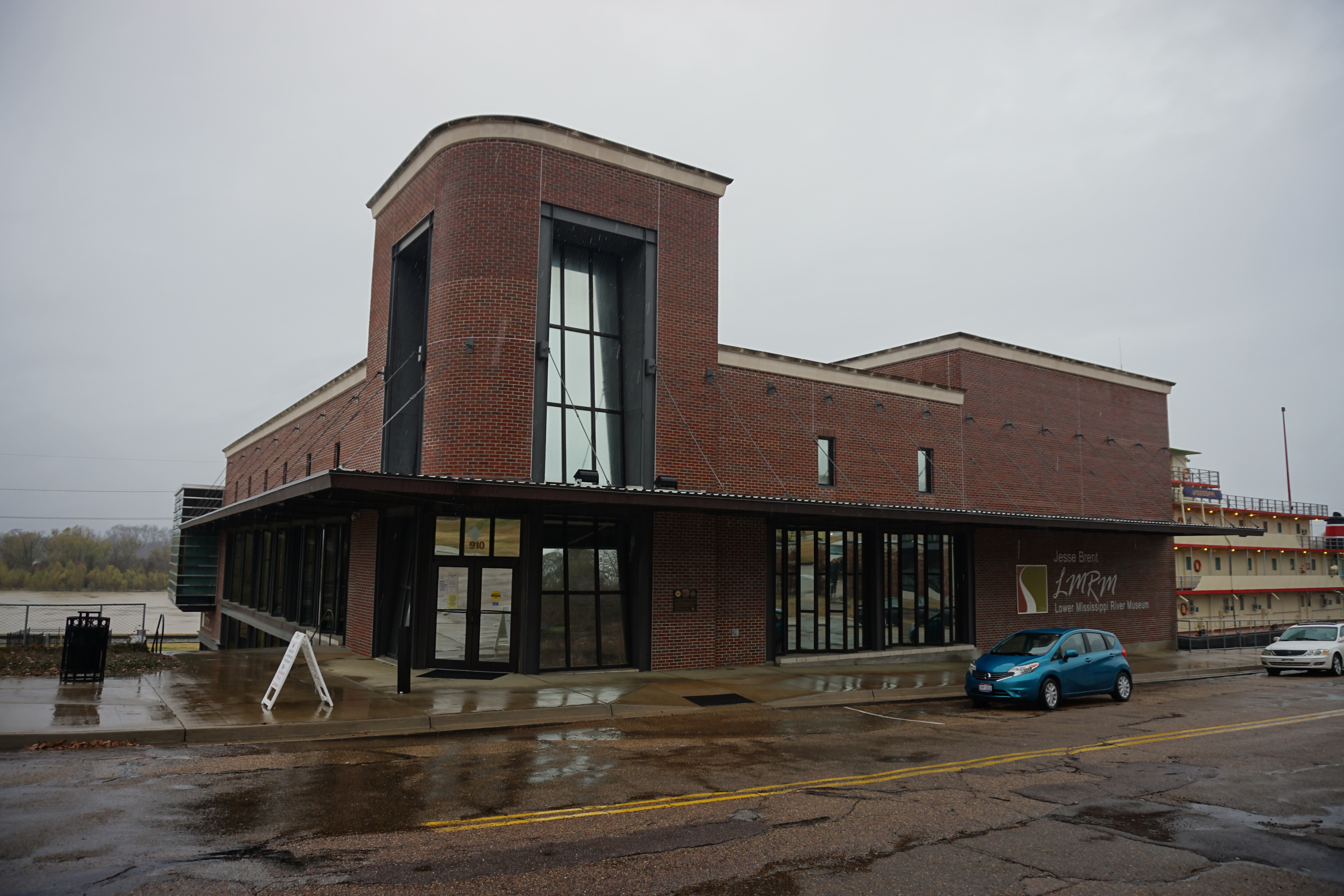
Lower Mississippi River Museum

The Lower Mississippi River Museum is a museum in Vicksburg, Mississippi.

The Water Resources Development Act of 1992 authorized the Lower Mississippi River Museum and Riverfront Interpretive Site. Consultation was directed with the Smithsonian Institution in the planning and design of the museum and site and with the Department of the Interior and the National Park Service in the planning, design, and implementation of interpretive programs. The museum is the first of its kind in the United States as it will be the first and only museum to maintain and house a fully restored, dry docked riverboat.

== M/V Mississippi IV ==
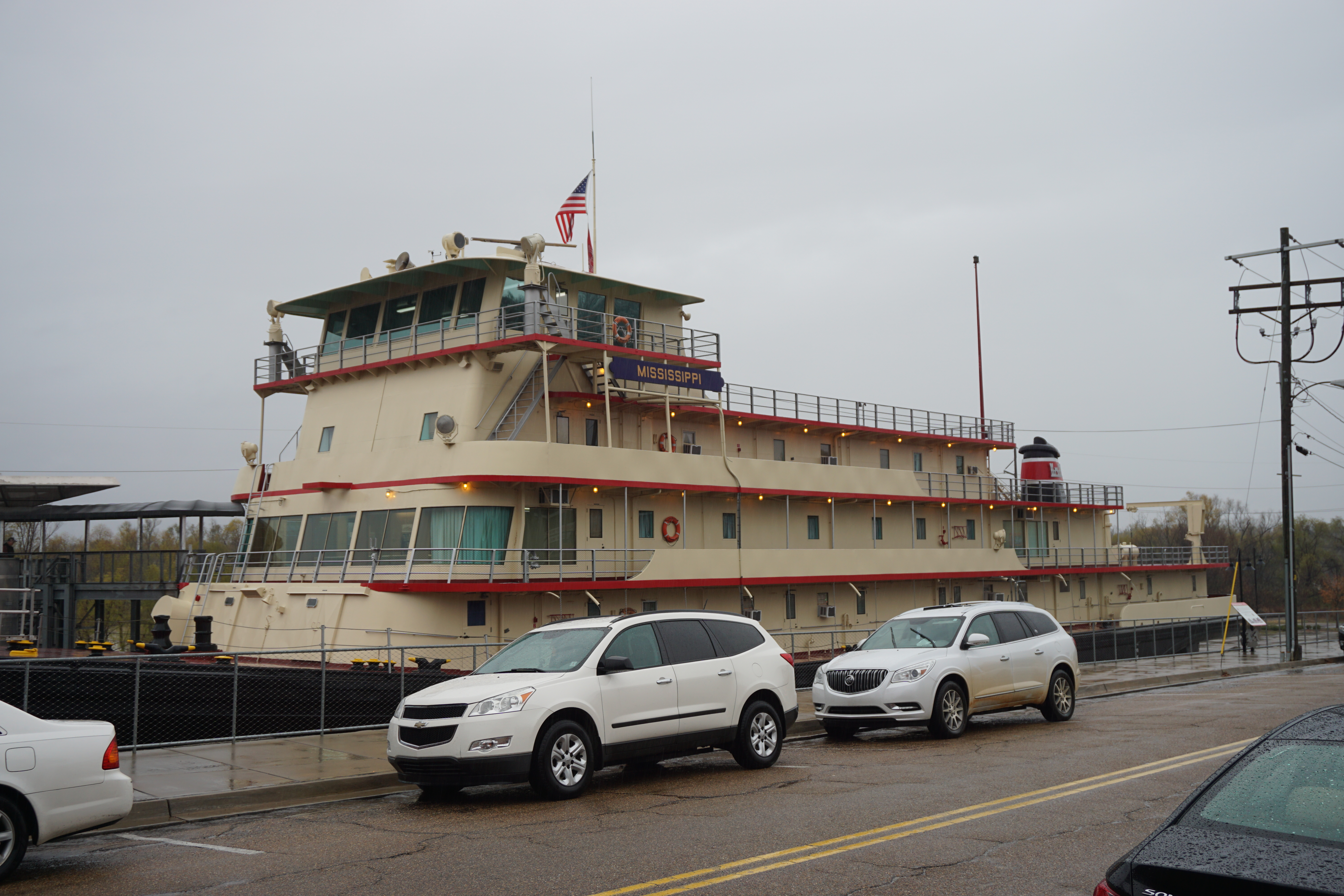
M/V Mississippi IV

Motor Vessel Mississippi is the fourth United States Army Corps of Engineers' vessel to carry that name. It is a diesel-powered vessel with an all-steel superstructure. Powered by two 8-cylinder engines, each of 1860 horsepower, for extra maneuverability it used controllable pitch propellers which allowed it to generate a reverse thrust of over 70% in the forward direction. The four levels on the superstructure are the main deckhouse, second deckhouse, Texas deckhouse, and the pilothouse. It served as a towboat and inspection vessel until decommissioned in 1993. On September 26, 2007 it was moved to its permanent location on land at the museum.
