= Flood Control Act of 1938 =

United States federal law

- Long title: An Act authorizing the construction of certain public works on rivers and harbors for flood control, and for other purposes.
- Nicknames: Public Works Act of 1938
- Enacted by: the 75th United States Congress
- Effective: June 28, 1938

Citations
- Public law: Pub. L. 75–761
- Statutes at Large: 52 Stat. 1215, Chap. 795

Codification
- Acts amended: Flood Control Act of 1936
- Titles amended: 33 U.S.C.: Navigable Waters
- U.S.C. sections amended: 33 U.S.C. ch. 15 § 701 et seq.

Legislative history
- Introduced in the House as H.R. 10618; Passed the House on June 7, 1938 (Passed); Passed the Senate on June 10, 1938 (Passed); Reported by the joint conference committee on June 14, 1938; agreed to by the House on June 14, 1938 (Agreed, in lieu of H.Res. 532) and by the Senate on June 15, 1938 (51-32); Signed into law by President Franklin D. Roosevelt on June 28, 1938

The Flood Control Act of 1938 was an Act of the United States Congress signed into law by President Franklin Delano Roosevelt that authorized civil engineering projects such as dams, levees, dikes, and other flood control measures through the United States Army Corps of Engineers and other Federal agencies. It is one of a number of Flood Control Acts passed nearly annually by the United States Congress.

== Projects covered by the Act (partial list) ==
=== Dams ===
- Blue Mountain Dam (begun 1941; completed 1947)
- Bull Shoals Dam (begun June 1947; completed July 1951)
- Coralville, Iowa, dam forming Coralville Lake (begun 1949; completed 1958)
- Delaware (Ohio) Dam (begun 1947; completed 1951)
- Denison Dam
- Green River Lake Dam, Kentucky (begun April 1964, completed June 1969)
- Kinzua Dam (begun 1960; completed 1965)
- Norfork Dam (begun 1941, completed 1944)
- Raccoon Creek dam in Parke County, Indiana, forming Mansfield Lake (begun October 1956; completed July 1960). Mansfield Lake was renamed Cecil M. Harden Lake in 1974.
- Dale Hollow Lake Dam, Tennessee (begun 1938, completed 1943)
- Shenango River Dam (begun 1963; completed 1965)
- Wappapello Dam and Lake Wappapello on the St. Francis River. Wappapello Dam was dedicated in June, 1941;Langdon R. Jones of Kennett, Missouri, delivered the dedication address at the request of Missouri Governor Lloyd C. Stark.

== See also ==
- Water Resources Development Act
- Rivers and Harbors Act

for related legislation which sometime also implement flood control provisions.
