= Water Resources Development Act of 1990 =

The Water Resources Development Act of 1990 (WRDA 1990), Pub. L. 101–640, was enacted by Congress of the United States on November 12, 1990. Most of the provisions of WRDA 1990 are administered by the United States Army Corps of Engineers.

== Title I: Water Resources Projects ==
Authorizes public works projects in specified locations for improvements to navigation, flood control, storm damage reduction, and the construction of recreation features. Specifies the total cost, as well as the estimated Federal and non-Federal cost, of each project.

Modifies various public works projects previously authorized under prior water resources development Acts.

Directs the studies for the completion of flood control projects in Arkansas, Indiana, Texas, and West Virginia. Increases the maximum amount authorized under the Flood Control Act of 1948 for a flood control project in the U.S. Virgin Islands.

Authorizes shoreline projects in Michigan and Pennsylvania.

Authorizes continuation of specified water resources projects notwithstanding a specified provision of the Water Resources Development Act of 1986 limiting the length of such projects.

Authorizes design and construction of certain flood control measures Kentucky as determined necessary for the prevention of further flood control damage.

Directs completion of a project for the removal of silt and aquatic weeds in Minnesota.

Directs projects for the rehabilitation and reconstruction of Federal flood control levees on the Arkansas River and the Red River.

Authorizes

- a project for flood protection in New Mexico
- planning, engineering, and design for the rehabilitation of the Lower Truckee River, Nevada, and for facilities to enable the passage of cui-ui fish and Lahontan cutthroat trout through its delta to obtain access to spawning grounds
- planning, engineering, and design for modifications to the Arkansas Post Navigation Canal
- design for replacement of a bridge Ohio
- design for the construction of a bridge between Kentucky and Ohio.

Authorizes the Secretary of the Army to undertake, complete, review, or act upon specified studies in connection with various water resources development projects. Authorizes appropriations.

Authorizes a study of wastewater treatment options for transporting contamination in Rhode Island to a facility in Rhode Island. Authorizes appropriations.

Directs technical assistance with respect to a comprehensive review of New York Harbor and a system investigation of the channels and anchorages of the Port of New York and New Jersey.

Deauthorizes specified water resources development projects.

== Title II: Land Transfers ==
Directs or authorizes transfer of specified real property in Florida, Michigan, and Washington.

Directs release to Clay County, Georgia, of the reversionary interest of the United States to specified real property in the County, subject to the condition that such property be used solely for the development of a retirement community.

Authorizes conveyance of certain Oakland Inner Harbor Tidal Canal property in Oakland, California, to the cities of Oakland and Alameda, California, under specified terms and conditions.

== Title III: Generally Applicable Provisions ==
Amends the Water Resources Development Act of 1986 to treat as construction the costs of planning and engineering of projects for which non-Federal interests contributed 50 percent or more of the cost of the feasibility study.

Includes preparation for emergency response to any natural disaster (currently, flood emergency preparation only) with actions for which emergency response funds are authorized to be used. Authorizes the use of such funds for certain emergency dredging.

Authorizes the Secretary to complete and transmit to the appropriate non-Federal interest any study for improvement to harbors or inland harbors initiated pursuant to the Rivers and Harbors Act of 1960 or, upon request, to terminate such study and transmit the partially completed study to the non-Federal interest.

Requires biennial reports beginning in 1992 concerning water resources project modifications for improving the quality of the environment in the public interest. Provides annual funding for such modification projects.

Directs environmental protection as one of the primary missions of the United States Army Corps of Engineers in planning, designing, constructing, operating, and maintaining water resources projects.

Establishes as part of the Corps of Engineers' water resources development program an interim goal of no net loss of the Nation's remaining wetlands base, and a long-term goal of increasing the quality and quantity of wetlands in the United States. Outlines goals and an action plan for the development and restoration of wetlands. Authorizes a program to evaluate and demonstrate the use of constructed wetlands for wastewater treatment, as well as methods by which such projects contribute to meeting the objectives of the Federal Water Pollution Control Act. Authorizes a demonstration program to determine the feasibility of wetlands restoration, enhancement, and creation as a means of contributing to achieving the wetlands goals.

Authorizes a program for the training and certification of individuals as wetlands delineators.

Prohibits certain new or substantially improved structures built in specified flood plains from being included in the benefit base for justifying Federal flood damage reduction projects. Requires a cost-sharing report and regulations in connection with such projects.

Directs a report to Congress on the advisability of not participating in the planning, implementation, or maintenance of any beach stabilization or renourishment project unless the State in which the proposed project will be located has established a beachfront management program that includes certain restrictions and provisions.

Directs the Secretary to establish for each major reservoir under the jurisdiction of the Corps a technical advisory committee to provide recommendations on reservoir monitoring and options for reservoir research. Requires ample public participation in the development or revision of reservoir operating manuals of the Corps. Directs a study of the operations of reservoir projects under Army jurisdiction and report the results to the Congress.

Directs, whenever necessary to meet the requirements of the Federal Water Pollution Control Act, removal of contaminated sediments outside the boundaries of and adjacent to the navigation channel as part of the operation and maintenance of a navigation project. Terminates such dredging requirement five years after enactment except for the completion of commenced projects.

Directs, in planning any water resources project, consideration of its impact on existing and future recreational and commercial uses. Requires any changes adversely affecting the recreational use of a project to be mitigated. Terminates such requirements five years after the enactment of this Act except for restoration already commenced on such date. Requires project costs to be shared by the beneficiaries of such recreation.

Provides that activities currently performed in connection with the operation and maintenance of hydroelectric power generating facilities of the Corps are to be considered inherently governmental functions and not commercial activities.

Amends the Water Resources Development Act of 1986 to include preservation and enhancement of the environment in matters to be addressed in water resources planning under such Act; and (2) increase from 40 to 100 percent of eligible operation and maintenance costs assigned to commercial navigation of all harbors and inland harbors of the United States the amount authorized to be appropriated out of the Harbor and Maintenance Trust Fund.

Authorizes Corps of Engineers' research and development laboratories to provide assistance to corporations, partnerships, limited partnerships, consortia, public and private foundations, universities, and nonprofit organizations operating within the United States or its territories or possessions under specified conditions, including that providing such assistance is in the public interest and within the mission of the Corps.

Amends the Water Resources Development Act of 1974 to authorize the Secretary, in order to recover 50 percent of the cost of providing assistance to States for the development, utilization, and conservation of water and related resources of drainage basins, to establish and collect appropriate fees from States and other non-Federal public bodies to whom such assistance is provided. Requires the Secretary to phase in such cost-sharing program.

Amends the Flood Control Act of 1960 to authorize collection of fees from Federal agencies and private individuals in order to recover costs of providing certain flood control information collection and dissemination services.

Authorizes water supply storage space requested by a low-income community if such space is available in a water resources development project operated by the Secretary.

== Title IV: Miscellaneous Provisions ==
Authorizes technical, planning, and engineering assistance to States and local governments in connection with Great Lakes remedial action plans identified under the Great Lakes Water Quality Agreement of 1978.

Amends the Water Resources Development Act of 1986 (WRDA 1986) to deauthorize the Cross Florida Barge Canal project located between the Gulf of Mexico and the Atlantic Ocean. Transfers Canal project land to the State of Florida.

Adds the removal of silt and aquatic growth at Wappingers Lake and at Lake George, New York, to water resources projects authorized under the WRDA 1986.

Amends WRDA 1986 to extend for five years the Upper Mississippi River Management Plan.

Authorizes Federal financial assistance for construction projects in the Virgin Islands to be made available to the Secretary in lieu of the Virgin Islands upon request of the Governor of the Islands.

Directs a local cooperative agreement with the city of Virginia Beach, Virginia, for beach nourishment.

Declares certain portions of Lake Erie to be nonnavigable waters of the United States.

Directs the Assistant Secretary of the Army for Civil Works, the United States Environmental Protection Agency (EPA), and the Governor of New York to jointly convene a management conference for the restoration, conservation, and management of Onondaga Lake, New York. Authorizes grants to New York for research, studies, surveys, and activities in connection with the development of a management plan for the Lake. Authorizes appropriations.

Directs EPA to report on the feasibility of designating an alternative site to the Mud Dump site in the New York/New Jersey harbor region for the disposal of dredged material. Requires a report to the Congress on a plan for the long-term management of such dredged material. Authorizes appropriations.

Requires the Army, the Bureau of Reclamation, and Bonneville Power Administration to issue a joint report on the regulation of Dworshak Dam, Idaho. Requires conduct public meetings in the area of the Dam in order to keep the public informed about projected drawdowns.

Directs relocation of the Southeast Light on Block Island, Rhode Island, to a more suitable location on such island. Authorizes appropriations.

Authorizes research and development activities on magnetic levitation (maglev) technology or to provide for such activities. Authorizes appropriations.

Authorizes the General Services Administration to exchange certain mineral and royalty interests in the Prado Flood Control Basin in Riverside, California, for excess Federal property, if requested to do so by the current holder of such interests.

Directs a study of the requirements of the use of materials and products produced in the United States Buy American Act requirements as they apply to water resources projects.

Expresses the sense of the Congress that priority consideration will be given to the authorization of water resources development projects which are recommended by the Chief of Engineers.

Authorizes the EPA to undertake a demonstration project to eliminate contamination of the waters near Woodlawn Beach, Hamburg, New York, from nonpoint sources of pollution resulting from surface runoff and septic system contamination entering Rush and Blasdell Creeks. Specifies the non-Federal share of the cost of the project.

== See also ==
- Flood Control Act
- Rivers and Harbors Act
