= Water Resources Development Act of 1986 =

The Water Resources Development Act of 1986 (WRDA 1986) is part of Pub. L. 99–662, a series of acts enacted by Congress of the United States on November 17, 1986.

WRDA 1986 established cost sharing formulas for the construction of harbors, inland waterway transportation, and flood control projects and established rules therefor. It also created hundreds of projects, studies, and plans in almost every state in the nation. It also deauthorized a number of projects.

== WRDA 1986 ==
WRDA 1986 directed the Secretary of the Army to issue guidelines for crediting against the non-Federal share of project cost for flood control any compatible work carried out by local interests. It authorized appropriations for the prosecution of the comprehensive plan of development for specified river basins and projects.

It also prohibited the Government from initiating any feasibility study for a water resources project until non-Federal interests agree to contribute 50 percent of the costs during the period of the study but exempted from such prohibition any study designed for purposes of navigational improvements. It also prohibited the Government from initiating any planning or engineering authorized by this Act until non-Federal interests agree to contribute 50 percent of the costs during the period of planning and engineering. Finally, WRDA 1986 provided for determining the interest rate when a non-Federal interest elects to repay an amount under this Act over a period of time.

Ultimately, WRDA 1986 authorized 262 water projects at a total cost of $16 billion.

=== Water Resources Conservation and Development ===
Authorized the Secretary to carry out 35 works of improvement for water resources development and conservation in Alabama, Mississippi, Alaska, Arkansas, California, Florida, Georgia, South Carolina, Iowa, Kentucky, Louisiana, Mississippi, Missouri, Illinois, Kansas, Nebraska, New York, North Carolina, Oklahoma, Oregon, Rhode Island, South Dakota, Tennessee, Texas, Virginia, Washington, West Virginia.

Authorized construction of the following projects subject to favorable reports by the Chief of Engineers: (1) Rillito River, Tucson, Arizona; (2) Wailua Falls, Wailua River, Kauai, Hawaii; (3) Yazoo River, Mississippi; and (4) Trinity River, Texas.

Authorized planning, engineering, and design for the following projects: (1) Neponset River, Milton Town Landing to Port Norfolk, Massachusetts; (2) Merrimack River, Massachusetts; (3) Buffalo Harbor, New York; (5) Wheeling Creek Watershed, Ohio; (5) Five Mile Creek, Dallas, Texas; and (6) Fox River Channel, Green Bay, Wisconsin.

Directed the following projects under provisions of the Rivers and Harbors Act of 1960: (1) Larkspur Ferry Channel, Larkspur, California; (2) Shelburne Bay, Vermont; and (3) Rudee Inlet, Virginia.

Authorized the construction of the Agat Small Boat Harbor, Guam, subject to a review and comment period by the Secretary.

Authorized the Secretary, after a review and comment period, to carry out removal of silt, aquatic growth, and other material in nine lakes.

Authorized the Secretary, after a review and comment period, to plan, design, and construct 13 streambank erosion control projects in Arkansas, California, Illinois, Minnesota, Mississippi, Nebraska, Nebraska, New Jersey, Ohio, South Dakota, Tennessee, Washington, and West Virginia.

Provides for the Secretary to carry out various beach erosion control, navigation, storm protection, streambank and shoreline erosion control, and harbor maintenance projects.

Authorizes the Secretary to undertake interim emergency flood control measures along Wheeling Creek in specified areas of Ohio.

Requires the Secretary, the Secretary of the Interior, and the Administrator of the Environmental Protection Agency to jointly develop a feasibility study for the construction of a water resources development project at Tolay Lake, California.

Authorizes the Secretary of Agriculture to complete construction of the following projects for run-off and waterflow retardation and soil erosion prevention: (1) Bush River Watershed, Virginia; (2) Great Creek Watershed, Virginia; and (3) Cottonwood-Walnut Creek Watershed, New Mexico.

Authorizes the Secretary of the Army to maintain a harbor of refuge in Port Ontario, Sandy Creek, New York. Authorizes the Secretary to construct shoreline protection measures at the Sky Harbor Municipal Airport, Duluth, Minnesota.

=== Water Resources Studies ===
Authorized the Secretary to study water resources needs of river basins and regions of the United States.

Directed the Secretary to prepare feasibility reports on the following water resources projects: (1) Illinois River, Hardin, Illinois; and (2) Kinnickinnic River, Milwaukee County, Wisconsin. Directs the Secretary to study water resourced development in the Virgin Islands, Guam, American Samoa, the Trust Territory of the Pacific Islands, and the Commonwealth of the Northern Mariana Islands.

Directed the Secretary, upon the request of local officials, to survey the potential and methods for rehabilitating former industrial sites, millraces, and similar types of facilities already constructed for use as hydroelectric facilities.

Directed the Secretary to study the capability of the Corps of Engineers to conserve fish and wildlife.

Amended the Water Resources Development Act of 1976 to include the areas of San Francisco and Marin, California, in the Secretary's investigation of flood and related problems in the San Francisco Bay area.

Authorizes the Secretary to conduct a study of shoreline protection and beach erosion policy and related projects in view of the expected increases in the levels of the Great Lakes.

Directs the Secretary to expedite completion of the study of New York Harbor and adjacent channels, New York and New Jersey.

Directs the Environmental Protection Agency to study, and report to specified congressional committees on, the extent and adverse environmental effects of dioxin contamination in the Passaic River-Newark Bay navigation system.

Directs the Secretary to study the feasibility of navigation improvements at Saginaw Bay and Saginaw River, Michigan.

Authorizes the Secretary to: (1) study the feasibility of constructing shoreline erosion mitigation measures along the Rancho Palos Verdes coastline and in the city of Rolling Hills, California; (2) conduct a nearshore sediment inventory in the offshore waters of Louisiana between Southwest Pass and Sabine Pass in Lake Pontchartrain and in Lake Borgne; and (3) study land acquisition policies applicable to water resources projects.

Prohibits the study of any river basin plan which has as its objective the transfer of water from either the Columbia or Arkansas River Basins to any other region or major river basin unless such study is approved by the Governors of all affected States.

Directs the Secretary to conduct a feasibility study of protection from erosion problems on the southern bank of the Black Warrior-Tombigbee River.

Authorizes the Secretary to study the feasibility of developing measures to control storm water runoff on a watershed basis.

Directs the Secretary to report to the Congress on the status of feasibility and reconnaissance studies relating to hydroelectric power potential at existing Corps of Engineers projects in Illinois, Indiana, Michigan, Ohio, Wisconsin, Iowa, Minnesota, Pennsylvania, and West Virginia.

Directs the Secretary to expedite the hydroelectric power studies of the Red River Basin Comprehensive Study, Arkansas, Texas, Louisiana, and Oklahoma.

Directs the Secretary to study current practices on the sharing of costs related to the benefits of increased land values resulting from water resources projects, together with potential methods by which any increase in land values should be shared between the Federal Government and non-Federal interests.

Authorizes the Secretary to study shoreline protection and beach erosion control policy and related projects in view of the prospect for long-term increases in the levels of the ocean.

Directs the Secretary to determine the extent of shoreline erosion damage in the United States causally related to the regulation of the waters of Lake Superior by the International Joint Commission (United States and Canada).

=== Inland Waterway Transportation System ===
Authorized the Secretary to commence the following navigation improvement projects: (1) Oliver Lock and Dam, Black Warrior-Tombigbee River, Alabama; (2) Locks and Dams 5 through 14, Kentucky River, Kentucky; (3) Gallipolis Locks and Dam Replacement, Ohio River, Ohio and West Virginia; (4) Bonneville Lock and Dam, Oregon and Washington - Columbia River and Tributaries, Washington; (5) Lock and Dam 7 Replacement, Monongahela River, Pennsylvania; (6) Lock and Dam 8 Replacement, Monongahela River, Pennsylvania; and (7) Winfield Locks and Dam, Kanawha River, West Virginia.

Established an Inland Waterways Users Board to make recommendations regarding construction and rehabilitation priorities and spending levels for the inland waterways.

=== Flood Control ===
Authorized the Secretary to commence 86 flood control projects in Alabama, Arizona, Arkansas, Tennessee, California, Colorado, Georgia, Hawaii, Idaho, Illinois, Illinois, Indiana, Iowa, Minnesota, Kansas, Louisiana, Massachusetts, Mississippi, Missouri, Nebraska, New Jersey, New York, New Mexico, Connecticut, North Carolina, South Carolina, North Dakota, Ohio, Oklahoma, Pennsylvania, Mississippi, Texas, Virginia, Washington, West Virginia, Wisconsin, Guam, and Puerto Rico.

Authorized construction of the following flood control projects, subject to favorable reports by the Chief of Engineers: (1) Guadalupe River, San Jose, California; (2) Meredosia, Illinois; (3) Muscatine Island, Iowa; (4) Pearl River Basin, St. Tammany Parish, Louisiana; (5) West Bank Hurricane Protection Levee, Jefferson Parish, Louisiana; and (6) James River, South Dakota.

Authorized the Secretary to carry out planning, engineering, and design for 12 flood control projects in, California, Kentucky, Louisiana, Massachusetts, Nevada, New Jersey, Oregon, and Pennsylvania.

Authorized construction of the following flood control projects in accordance with provisions of the Flood Control Act of 1948: (1) San Francisco River at Clifton, Arizona; (2) Mission Zanja Creek, Redlands, California; (3) Salt and Eel Rivers, California; (4) Monroe and West Monroe, Louisiana, and Ouachita Parish, Louisiana; and (5) Noyes, Minnesota.

Authorized the construction of the following flood control projects subject to review and comment by the Secretary: (1) Salyersville, Kentucky; (2) Poplar Brook, New Jersey; (3) Pearly River Basin, Mississippi; (4) Great Salt Lake, Utah; and (5) Tarrant County, Texas.

Required non-Federal interests to agree to participate in and comply with applicable Federal flood plain management and flood insurance programs.

Revised the definition of "flood control" to include protection from groundwater induced damages.

=== Shoreline Protection ===
Authorized the Secretary to commence 18 shoreline protection projects in compliance with the Coastal Barrier Resources Act in Florida, Illinois, Indiana, Maryland, New York, New Jersey, North Carolina, Ohio, Pennsylvania, South Carolina, and Virginia.

Authorized construction of the following projects subject to a favorable report by the Chief of Engineers: (1) Pinellas County, Florida; (2) Illinois Beach State Park, Illinois; and (3) Coconut Point, Tutuila Island, American Samoa.

Authorized the Secretary to carry out planning, engineering, and design for projects for shoreline erosion control at the following communities in New Jersey: Fort Elsinboro, Sea Breeze, Gandys Beach, Reeds Beach, Pierces Point, and Fortescue.

Authorized the Secretary to carry out the project for beach erosion control at Orchard Beach, New York, in accordance with the Rivers and Harbors Act of 1962.

Directs the Secretary to apply to cost sharing provisions of the Water Resources Development Act of 1974 to periodic nourishment of the continuing construction project at Westhampton Beach, New York, for a period of 20 years after enactment of this Act.

=== Project Modifications ===
WRDA 1986 modified 72 specific projects for navigation improvements and flood control in Virginia, Ohio, New York, Louisiana, Kentucky, Oregon, Colorado, California, Hawaii, Colorado, Alabama, Wisconsin, Minnesota, Illinois, Texas, District of Columbia, Maryland, Mississippi, Arkansas, Pennsylvania, New York City, New Jersey, Georgia, Florida, Montana, Pennsylvania, Iowa, Tennessee, Michigan, Oklahoma, Wyoming, Colorado, Florida, Montana, Virginia, Washington, Delaware, Vermont, New Mexico, and Connecticut.

=== General Provisions ===
Establishes ceilings for Corps of Engineers construction activities for FY 1987 through 1991. Provides that project costs under this Act may only be increased for changes in construction costs and for modifications that do not alter the functions of the project.

Required water resources projects to address the enhancement of national economic development in the formulation and evaluation of such projects.

Directed the Secretary to prepare a feasibility report for every water resource study authorized. Enumerates information to be included in such report. Directs the Secretary, before preparing a feasibility report, to perform a reconnaissance survey of the potential water resources project to define problems with the project, together with their possible solutions.

Required the mitigation of fish and wildlife losses to be undertaken before construction on the project involved begins. Authorizes the Secretary to mitigate damages to fish and wildlife.

Deems the benefits attributable to environmental quality measures included in a water resources project to be at least equal to project costs.

Establishes an Environmental Protection and Mitigation Fund. Authorizes appropriations for this Fund for fiscal years beginning with FY 1986. Authorizes use of the Fund to mitigate project-induced losses to fish and wildlife production and habitat.

Amends the Flood Control Act of 1970 to allow an agreement with States for water resources projects to reflect that it does not obligate future State appropriations for performance when such obligation would be inconsistent with State constitutional or statutory limitations. Establishes penalties for non-Federal interest noncompliance with such agreements and interest rates for delinquent payments.

Amends the Flood Control Act of 1968 to increase the per-project Federal reimbursement to States or political subdivisions for water resources development projects.

Authorizes the Secretary, for projects for which the Federal cost is less than $3,000,000, to disregard frequency of flooding, drainage area, and amount of runoff in the preparation of feasibility reports for projects for flood damage prevention in urban and rural areas.

Authorizes the Chief of Engineers to perform emergency work, at the request of a Governor, on public and private lands and waters made necessary by an emergency or disaster which is essential for the preservation of life and property.

Requires surveying and mapping services of a water resources project to be undertaken in accordance with the Federal Property and Administrative Services Act of 1949.

Requires the Secretary to disclose petroleum product information to any State taxing agency that requests it, if such State has a law which protects the confidentiality of the information.

Amends the Water Resources Development Act of 1976 to authorize appropriations for each fiscal year beginning after FY 1986 for increased law enforcement services at water resources development projects during peak visitation periods.

Amends the Water Resources Development Act of 1974 to increase the authorized appropriations to States for planning assistance.

Requires the Secretary and the Chief of Engineers to compile laws relating to water resources development enacted after November 8, 1966, and before January 1, 1987. Requires that such laws be printed for the use of the Department of the Army, the Congress, and the general public. Directs the Secretary to reprint the volumes containing such laws enacted before November 8, 1966, and transmit such volumes to the Congress.

Directs the Secretary to prepare biennially a public report for each State containing a description and the status of each water resources project in such State.

Requires the acquisition of required recreation lands along with the acquisition of other lands relating to a water resources project. Prohibits the Secretary from requiring non-Federal interests to assume operation of any federally-run facility as a condition for the construction of new recreational facilities. Requires reports on projects having recreational benefits to describe the anticipated impact of proposed projects on existing recreational facilities.

Amends the Watershed Protection and Flood Protection Act to require that certain watershed projects contain benefits directly related to agriculture.

Directs the Secretary of Agriculture to report to the appropriate congressional committees on the feasibility, desirability, and the public interest involved in requiring that public access be provided to all water impoundments that have recreation-related potential and that were authorized pursuant to the Watershed Protection and Flood Protection Act.

Amends the Water Supply Act of 1958 to provide for States to reimburse Corps of Engineer projects on an annual basis. Amends the Water Resources Development Act of 1976 to provide that the non-Federal share of costs for disposal of material on beaches shall be 50 percent (currently, such share is 100 percent). Authorizes the Secretary to provide beach nourishment for certain water resources projects for up to 50 years after construction is initiated on such projects (currently, beach nourishment is authorized for up to 15 years). Authorizes the Secretary to acquire nondomestic beach fill if, for environmental or economic reasons, such material is non available from domestic sources.

Amends the Rivers and Harbors Act of 1899 to impose cost liability upon the owner, lessee, or operator of a sunken vessel removed from navigable waters by the United States.

Authorizes the Secretary to investigate, study, plan, and implement structural and nonstructural measures for the prevention of shore damages attributable to Federal navigation works, if a non-Federal public body agrees to operate and maintain such measures under regulations of the Secretary.

Amends the Rivers and Harbors Act of 1958 to increase authorized appropriations for the control of aquatic plant growths.

Authorizes the Secretary to provide technical assistance, upon request, to States or local governments to carry out projects for renovating navigable streams and tributaries by cost-effective methods, if the non-Federal interests contribute half the costs. Authorizes the Secretary to preserve, restore, and maintain historic properties located on water resource development project lands if such properties have been entered into the National Register of Historic Places.

Directs the Army, Federal Emergency Management Agency, and the Soil Conservation Service to take necessary action to ensure that information relating to flood hazard areas is available to the public.

Allows the General Services Administration to dispose of any Corps of Engineers vessel, or related equipment, used for dredging that is declared to be in excess of Federal needs. Provides that proceeds from the sale or lease of such vessels or equipment shall be deposited into the revolving fund authorized by the Civil Functions Appropriations Act.

Directs the Secretary, when considering permit applications for docks and boat launching facilities, to consider the needs for lighting from sunset to sunrise to make such facility's presence known within a reasonable distance.

Authorizes the use of Farmers Home Administration assistance to pay the non-Federal share of water resources projects.

Amends the Flood Control Act of 1970 to increase authorized appropriations for the Arkansas River Basin and Red River Basin chloride control projects.

Prohibits water from being diverted from any portion of the Great Lakes within the United States unless such diversion is approved by the Governor of each of the Great Lake States.

Amends the Water Resources Development Act of 1974 to increased authorized appropriations for the Big South Fork National River and Recreation Area, Kentucky and Tennessee.

Establishes the Cross Florida National Conservation Area. Provides that the State of Florida shall retain jurisdiction and responsibility for water resources planning, development, and control of the surface and ground water of the Conservation Area.

Directs the Secretary, in consultation with the U.S. Forest Service, the U.S. Fish and Wildlife Service, and the State of Florida, to develop and transmit to the Congress a comprehensive management plan with respect to lands in the Conservation Area.

Directs the Secretary to operate the Rodman Dam in a manner which will assure the continuation of Lake Ocklawaha. Prohibits the Secretary from operating the Eureka Lock and Dam in a manner which would create a reservoir on lands not flooded on January 1, 1984.

Directs the Secretary to acquire lands held by the Canal Authority of the State of Florida for the barge canal deauthorized by this Act. Directs the Canal Authority to make payments to specified Florida Counties.

Authorizes the Cherokee Nation of Oklahoma to design and construct hydroelectric generating facilities at the W.D. Mayo Lock and Dam on the Arkansas River in Oklahoma.

Authorizes the irrigation projects known as the Hilltop Irrigation District (Brule County) and the Gray Goose Irrigation District (Hughes County), South Dakota, as units of the Pick-Sloan Missouri Basin Program.

Amends the Water Resources Research Act to establish the High Plains Study Council to: (1) review research work conducted by State advisory committees; and (2) coordinate such research to avoid duplication of efforts by States of the High Plains. Directs the Secretary of the Interior to establish within each State of the High Plains Region an Ogallala Aquifer technical advisory committee (the State Committee). Directs such State Committee to: (1) review existing State laws concerning water management and recommend appropriate changes; (2) establish State priorities for water resources research and demonstration projects; and (3) provide information and technical assistance concerning the need for water conservation and management.

Directs the Secretary to allocate annually funds to States of the High Plains Region for research in water-use efficiency, cultural methods, irrigation technologies, water-efficient crops, and water and soil conservation. Directs that such funds shall be distributed to State institutions of higher learning on the basis of merit.

Directs the Secretary to divide funds among the States of the High Plains Region for research into: (1) precipitation management; (2) weather modification; (3) aquifer recharge opportunities; (4) saline water uses; (5) desalinization technologies; (6) salt-tolerant crops; and (7) ground water recovery.

Directs the Secretary to allocate annually funds to High Plains Region States for grants to farmers for demonstration projects in: (1) water-efficient irrigation technologies and practices; (2) soil and water conservation management systems; and (3) the growth and marketing of more water-efficient crops. Provides that such grants to farmers shall be made on the basis of merit.

Directs the Secretary of the Army, acting through the United States Geological survey, to monitor the levels of the Ogallala Aquifer, and report annually to the Congress.

Requires that the Pick-Sloan Missouri Basin Program be prosecuted to its ultimate development as rapidly as possible.

=== Miscellaneous Programs and Projects ===
Directs the Secretary of the Army to undertake a program for the control of river ice, to assist communities in the breakup of such ice, and to provide technical assistance to local units of government to control or break up such ice. Authorizes appropriations for FY 1988 through 1992.

Authorizes the restoration and rehabilitation of irrigation ditch systems (acequias) in NM. Under Section 1113 of the Act, Congress has found that NM's acequias date from the eighteenth century and, due to their significance in the settlement and development of the western U.S., should be restored and preserved for their cultural and historic values to the region. The Secretary of the Army, therefore, has been authorized and directed to undertake, without regard to economic analysis, such measures as are necessary to protect and restore NM's acequias, with a non-Federal work share of 25%.

Declares whitewater recreation to be a purpose of the Summersville Lake project on the Gauley River, West Virginia.

Authorizes the Secretary to cooperate with governments in Canada to study and to construct reservoir projects for storage in the Souris River Basin in Canada to provide flood control benefits in the United States. Deauthorizes construction of the Burlington Dam, North Dakota, and certain modifications to the dam structure at Lake Darling, North Dakota, upon completion of the Canadian structures. Authorizes completion of such projects if an agreement for the Canadian structures cannot be consummated. Authorizes the Secretary to make flood control modifications to the Lake Darling structure.

Declares specified lands in North Dakota to be held in trust by the United States for the benefit and use of the Three Affiliated Tribes of the Fort Berthold Reservation and to be part of such reservation. Directs the Secretary of the Interior, in consideration for such transfer in trust, to transfer to the United States lands of equal value held in trust for the Tribes which are required for the maintenance and operation of the Garrison Dam and Reservoir project.

Authorizes the Secretary to pay the Federal share of the settlement amount resulting from a specified decision of the Engineer Board of Contract Appeals.

Authorizes the Secretary to establish and develop campgrounds for individuals 62 years of age or older at any lake or reservoir under the Secretary's jurisdiction. Authorizes appropriations for fiscal years beginning 1984. Authorizes the development of and appropriations for a 62-or-older campground in Texas at the Sam Rayburn Dam and Reservoir. Identifies such parcel of land by metes and bounds.

Declares the intent of the Congress to recognize the importance of the economic vitality of the Great Lakes region and Saint Lawrence Seaway as the "Fourth Seacoast" of the United States. Establishes the Great Lakes Commodities Marketing Board (the Board) to develop a strategy to improve the capacity of the Great Lakes region to produce, market, and transport commodities in a timely manner and to maximize the efficiency and benefits of market products produced in and/or shipped through the Great Lakes region. Requires the strategy to address environmental issues relating to transportation on the Great Lakes and marketing difficulties experienced due to late harvest seasons in the Great Lakes region. Requires such strategy to develop and analyze various information concerning marketing and shipping in the Great Lakes region. Outlines the composition and organizational rules for the Board. Requires the Board, no later than September 30, 1989, to submit a report to the President and both Houses of the Congress on strategies to assure maximum economic benefits to users of the Great Lakes region. Terminates the Board 180 days after such report is submitted. Authorizes appropriations for FY 1987 through 1990.

Directs the President to invite the Government of Canada to join in the formation of an international advisory group to: (1) develop a bilateral program for improving navigation on the Great Lakes; and (2) conduct investigations and make recommendations for a systemwide navigation improvement program on the Great Lakes. Outlines the composition and organizational rules for such advisory group. Requires such group, one year after its formation and biennially thereafter, to report to the Congress and the Canadian Parliament on its progress.

Directs the Secretary and the EPA to carry out a review of the environmental, economic, and social impacts of navigation in the U.S. portion of the Great Lakes. Requires the Secretary and the Administrator to submit an interim report to the Congress by September 30, 1988, and a final report by September 30, 1990.

Provides that certain prohibitions and provisions for review of activities in waters of the U.S. shall not apply to any water development projects at the Great Miami River Basin or the Great Miami River and its tributaries in Ohio.

Provides that any lease for projects in this Act shall continue in effect on and after December 31, 1989, until such lease is terminated by the leaseholder. Requires fair market values for such leases after such date. Enumerates conditions required before the Secretary may terminate a lease on or after December 31, 1989.

Authorizes review by the Secretary of water projects constructed before enactment of this Act to determine the need for modifications to improve environmental quality. Authorizes the Secretary to carry out a demonstration program within two years of enactment of this Act for the purpose of making modifications in the structures and operations of water projects constructed before enactment. Requires a report to the Congress concerning such project. Authorizes appropriations.

Requires the Secretary to expedite completion of a study for a new lock parallel to Poe Lock on the Saint Lawrence Seaway and submit a report to the Congress. Directs the Secretary to report to the Congress every January.

Authorizes the Secretary to construct and improve facilities at the Niagara Frontier Transportation Authority, Port of Buffalo.

Requires the Secretary, beginning October 1, 1987, to carry out measurements and make necessary computations relating to the diversion of water from Lake Michigan and to coordinate the results with downstate Illinois interests. Defines the measurements to be taken. Authorizes appropriations beginning with FY 1986.

Authorizes the Secretary to undertake certain construction and repair on the Tutuila Islands, American Samoa.

Authorizes the Secretary to conduct a study of the effects of Great Lakes water consumption on economic growth and environmental quality in the Great Lakes region and of control measures that can be implemented to reduce the quantity of water consumed. Authorizes appropriations for such study.

Authorizes the Secretary to acquire from willing sellers land which is subject to frequent flood damage, located within the Passaic River Basin flood control study area.

Authorizes and directs the Secretary to construct a second lock adjacent to the existing lock at Sault Sainte Marie, Michigan.

Directs the Secretary to consider structural, nonstructural, and primarily nonstructural alternatives to solving the water resources problem of the Upper St. John's River Basin, Florida.

Directs the Secretary to consult with concerned Great Lake States regarding the selection of disposal areas for dredged material.

Allows the Secretary to waive local cost-sharing requirements up to $200,000 and approve the construction of projects with a lower benefit to cost ratio in American Samoa, Guam, the Northern Mariana Islands, the Virgin Islands, and the Trust Territory of the Pacific.

Authorizes the Secretary to undertake streambank erosion protection measures along the Ohio and Wabash Rivers, Illinois.

Declares the interest rate for analyzing the costs and benefits of the San Luis Rey River Flood control program, San Diego, California, to be that agreed upon under the Flood Control Act of 1968.

Directs the Secretary of Transportation to transmit to the Congress a list of those bridges over navigable waters of the United States constructed, reconstructed, or removed between January 1, 1948, and January 1, 1985.

Authorizes the Secretary to perform dredging in Avalon Bay, Santa Catalina Island, California.

Modifies the project for flood control for Ellicott Creek, New York, to allow a credit against the non-Federal share of the cost of construction.

Amends the Marine Protection, Research, and Sanctuaries Act of 1972 to declare the New York Bight Apex and the "106-Mile Ocean Waste Dump Site" as unsuitable for dumping of municipal sludge.

Declares the Federal share of the cost of construction of the Chicago Tunnel and Reservoir Project, Illinois, to be 75 percent.

=== Project Deauthorizations ===
Deauthorized over 300 flood control, hydroelectric power, or navigation projects

== Other Acts of P.L. 99-662 ==
=== Harbor Development and Navigation Improvement Act of 1986 ===
Authorized the Secretary to construct deep-draft harbor projects in Alabama, Louisiana, Texas, Virginia, California, New York and New Jersey.

Authorized the Secretary to construct 35 general cargo and shallow harbor projects in Alaska, California, Connecticut, Florida, Georgia, Hawaii, Michigan, Minnesota, Wisconsin, Mississippi, New Hampshire, New York, New Jersey, North Carolina, Ohio, South Carolina, Texas, Washington, Commonwealth of the Northern Mariana Islands, Puerto Rico, US Virgin Islands, and Louisiana.

Allowed a non-Federal interest to submit to the Secretary for review a feasibility study of a proposed harbor or inland harbor project. Required the Secretary to submit to the Congress the results of the review together with recommendations and to credit the non-Federal share of the costs of such study if the project is subsequently authorized by law.

Provided for the undertaking by non-Federal entities of the construction of navigation projects approved by the Secretary and for crediting the non-Federal share of such construction. Requires the Secretary, prior to such construction, to coordinate and schedule Federal, State, and local actions regarding environmental assessments, project reviews and permits.

Authorized appropriations out of the Harbor Maintenance Trust Fund for each fiscal year to pay 100 percent of the eligible operations and maintenance costs of the Saint Lawrence Seaway and 40 percent of such costs of commercial navigation of all harbors and inland harbors within the United States. Authorizes appropriations out of for each fiscal year to pay the balance of all eligible operations and maintenance costs.

Expressed the policy of the Congress that use of the disposal site known as "Mud Dump" near Sandy Hook, New Jersey, shall be terminated, and replacement sites shall be designated by the Administrator of the Environmental Protection Agency within three years of the enactment of this Act. Requires annual reports by the Administrator concerning such designation. Authorizes the Secretary to make grants to any non-Federal interest operating a project for a port for provision of emergency response services in such port. Authorizes the Secretary to make a grant to the non-Federal interest operating Morro Bay Harbor, California, for construction of a new port office.

=== Upper Mississippi River System Management Act of 1986 ===
Provides that Congress recognizes the Upper Mississippi River System as a nationally significant ecosystem and commercial navigation system, and provides for the administration and regulation of such system.

Authorizes the Secretary to provide for the construction of a second lock at locks and dam 26, Mississippi River, Alton, Illinois and Missouri. Authorizes the Secretary, in concert with the Secretary of the Interior and the Association, to undertake various programs for the enhancement of the Upper Mississippi River System. Authorizes appropriations for this purpose. Authorizes such Secretary to implement a program of recreational projects for the System. Authorizes appropriations for this purpose.

Amends the Rivers and Harbors Act of 1958 to increase the authorized appropriations for the operation of the Illinois and Mississippi Canal.

=== Dam Safety Act of 1986 ===
Amends public law concerning the definition of "dam". Authorizes appropriations for FY 1988 through 1992. Provides for the distribution of such funds among the States.

Directs the Secretary to provide assistance to any State that establishes and maintains a dam safety program which includes the following: (1) a procedure for the review of dam plans to determine their safety; (2) a procedure to determine that such a dam will be operated in a safe manner; (3) a procedure for inspection at least once every five years, or more if warranted; (4) the State has the power to modify the dam to assure its safety; (5) the State develops a system of emergency procedures to be followed in the event of dam failure; and (6) the State has the necessary emergency funds to make immediate repairs in order to protect human life and property. Provides for the approval of submitted programs within 120 days unless notified prior to that time by the Secretary. Provides for periodic review of dam safety programs by the Secretary.

Authorizes the establishment of a National Dam Safety Review Board to review and monitor State implementation of this Act.

Requires Federal officials to consult and cooperate with State officials on the design and safety of dams. Authorizes appropriations for the training of State dam safety inspectors for FY 1988 through 1992.

Directs the Secretary to begin research to develop techniques and equipment for more efficient dam inspection. Provides for State participation in such research. Authorizes appropriations for FY 1988 through 1992.

Authorizes the Secretary to maintain and publish information on the inventory of dams authorized under this Act. Authorizes appropriations.

Provides that no funds authorized in this Act shall be used to construct or repair any Federal or non-Federal dam.

Requires reports to certain congressional committees which propose construction of water impoundment facilities to include information on the consequences of failure and geologic or design factors which could contribute to the possible failure of such facilities.

Provides for the recovery of costs incurred in the modification of dams and related facilities caused by new hydrologic or seismic data or changes deemed necessary for safety purposes.

Authorizes the Secretary to perform detailed engineering studies to determine the structural integrity of any dam found to contain hazardous conditions during an inspection. Requires the dam owner to reimburse the Secretary for expenses.

Authorizes the Secretary to provide technical assistance to the repair of the spillway and other measures to restore the safety of the dam used in the Schuyler County Public Water Supply District Number 1, Missouri. Authorizes the Secretary to provide technical assistance for necessary repairs to the Milton Dam, Mahoning County, Ohio.

== Namings ==
Designates the following reservoirs, harbors, and locks and dams: (1) Jennings Randolph Lake, Maryland and West Virginia; (2) James W. Trimble Lock and Dam, Arkansas; (3) Arthur V. Ormond Lock and Dam, Arkansas; (4) Greilickville Harbor, Michigan; (5) Wilbur D. Mills Dam, Arkansas; (6) S. W. Taylor Memorial Park, Alabama; (7) H. K. Thatcher Lock and Dam, Arkansas; (8) DeWayne Hayes Recreation Area, Mississippi; (9) Winthrop Rockefeller Lake, Arkansas; (10) Wehrspann Lake, Nebraska; and (11) Jack D. Maltester Channel, California.

== Revenue Provisions ==
Harbor Maintenance Revenue Act of 1986 - Amends the Internal Revenue Code to impose an excise tax on the value of commercial cargo loaded onto or unloaded from commercial vessels at U.S. ports. Provides an exemption from such tax: (1) for cargo loaded in or destined for Alaska, Hawaii, or any possession of the United States; (2) where the transportation of such cargo has been subject to the excise tax for fuels used in commercial transportation on inland waterways; (3) for the Government of the United States; and (4) bonded commercial cargo entering the United States for transportation and direct exportation to a foreign country.

Establishes within the Treasury of the United States the Harbor Maintenance Trust Fund. Provides that amounts from such fund shall be available for: (1) the operation and maintenance of those portions of the Saint Lawrence Seaway operated and maintained by the Saint Lawrence Seaway Development Corporation; (2) the operation and maintenance costs of commercial waterways within the United States; and (3) the payment of certain rebates. Provides for the transfer of certain charges and tolls from the Saint Lawrence Seaway Development Corporation to the Harbor Maintenance Trust Fund.

Increases the tax on fuel used in commercial transportation on inland waterways beginning in 1987. Amends the Inland Waterways Revenue Act of 1978 to include the Tennessee-Tombigbee Waterway from the Tennessee River to the Warrior River at Demopolis, Alabama, as an inland and intracoastal waterway.

Establishes in the Treasury of the United States the Inland Waterways Trust Fund. Provides that amounts from such trust fund shall be available for construction and rehabilitation expenditures for navigation on inland and coastal waterways.

Directs the Secretary of State to initiate discussions with the Government of Canada regarding the elimination or reduction of all tolls on the international Great Lakes and the Saint Lawrence Seaway. Directs the Secretary of Transportation to report to the Congress on the progress of such discussions and its economics effect on waterborne commerce.

Directs the Secretary of the Treasury to study, and report to the Congress on, the impact of the port use charge on potential diversions of cargo from U.S. ports to ports of countries contiguous to the United States.

== See also ==
- Flood Control Act
- Rivers and Harbors Act
