= Water Resources Development Act of 1976 =

Water Resources Development Act of 1976, (WRDA 1976), Pub. L. 94–587 is a public law enacted on October 22, 1976, by the Congress of the United States of America concerning various water resources and projects.

== Project design and study ==
WRDA 1976 authorized the Secretary of the Army, acting through the Chief of Engineers, to carry out the phase I design memorandum stage of advanced engineering and design on 35 projects for flood control and other purposes in New Jersey, New York, Pennsylvania, Virginia, Georgia, South Carolina, Puerto Rico, Wisconsin, Indiana, Oregon, Nebraska, Missouri, Tennessee, Mississippi, Texas, New Mexico, Oregon, Washington, North Dakota, California, Connecticut, Illinois, Ohio, Alaska, Mississippi, Arkansas, and Louisiana.

Authorizes the Secretary of the Army, acting through the Chief of Engineers, to investigate and study the following: (1) the development of a river system management plan for the Upper Mississippi River ($9,100,000); (2) the advisability and feasibility of providing flood protection by dredging the Susquehanna River, Wyoming County, Pennsylvania; (3) the feasibility of providing protection against tidal and fluvial flooding along the San Francisco Bay shoreline, California; (4) the development of land and water resources in American Samoa; (5) the development of land and water resources in the Hilo Bay Area, Hawaii and Kailua-Kona, Hawaii; (6) the identification of navigational hazards through hydrographic surveys of the Columbia River from Richland, Washington, to the Grand Coulee Dam ($500,000); (7) the improvement of waterway systems under the jurisdiction of the Secretary; (8) the water and surface transportation needs resulting from the expansion and development of San Pedro Bay ports, California and the feasibility of enlarging the Dominguez Channel, California, for flood control purposes; (9) the most efficient methods of utilizing the hydroelectric power resources at water resource development projects under the jurisdiction of the Secretary; (10) the development of water supplies in the High Plains Region, Colorado, Kansas, New Mexico, Oklahoma, Texas, and Nebraska; and (11) the feasibility and appropriateness of the removal and disposal of debris remaining as a result of military construction during World War II in the vicinity of Metlakatla and Annette Island, Alaska.

== Navigation and flood control ==
Authorized the prosecution of the following works of improvement for the benefit of navigation and the control of floods and for other purposes: (1) Chaska, Minnesota, on the Minnesota River flood control project ($10,498,000); (2) James River at Richmond, Virginia, filtration plant flood control project ($4,617,000); (3) Harris Fork Creek, Tennessee and Kentucky, flood control ($5,000,000); (4) Neches River at Beaumont, Texas salt water control project ($14,300,000); (5) Los Angeles-Long Beach harbors, California navigation project ($16,850,000); and (6) Lower Snake River, Washington and Idaho fish and wildlife compensation plan ($58,400,000).

== Project modifications ==
Modified 37 existing projects in Texas, Arkansas, Connecticut, Iowa, Alabama, Virginia, Mississippi, Oklahoma, Pennsylvania, California, Illinois, Utah, Louisiana, North Carolina, South Carolina, Georgia, Minnesota, North Dakota, Kansas, New Mexico, Idaho, Washington, Oregon, Alaska, New York, and Pennsylvania.

== Miscellaneous ==
Authorizes the Secretary of the Army, acting through the Chief of Engineers, to undertake the following: (1) the replacement of Vermillon Lock on the Gulf Intracoastal Waterway, Louisiana ($20,683,000); (2) the conveyance by quitclaim deed to C.B. Porter Scott and Dorothy Boren Scott of Randall county, Texas, of specified land acquired as part of the project for Belton Lake, Texas; (3) the removal of Shooters' Island, Arthur Kill, New York; (4) the planning and establishment of wetland areas as a part of authorized water resources development projects; (5) the participation in construction of a levee and protective seawall at Liberty Park, New Jersey ($12,600,000); (6) the assumption of maintenance of the Mermentau River and the Gulf of Mexico Navigation Channel, Louisiana (at an annual cost of $155,000); (7) the construction of the flood protection project at Bassett Creek Watershed, Minnesota ($7,593,000); (8) to survey the Navajo Nation, Arizona, New Mexico, and Utah for flood control purposes; (9) the relocation of specified water intakes located on a pier of the Lewis and Clark Bridge on the Missouri River threatened by silt; (10) the construction of a flood control project on the Red River below Denison Dam, Texas, Arkansas, and Louisiana ($4,131,000); (11) the construction of a flood control project on Galveston Bay, Baytown, Texas ($15,680,000); (12) the construction of a flood control project on the Santa Fe River and Arroyo Mascaras, New Mexico with specified restrictions ($8,200,000); (13) the construction of the project for Pine Mountain Lake on Lee Creek, Arkansas and Oklahoma; (14) the construction of a highway bridge over the Snake River between Lewiston, Idaho and Clarkston, Washington ($21,000,000); and (15) carrying out of a five-year demonstration project to temporarily increase the diversion of water from Lake Michigan at Chicago, Illinois.

Declares the following bodies of water to be non-navigable: (1) Lake Oswego (Oregon); (2) Lake Coeur d'Alene (Idaho) and (3) Lake George (New York).

Authorizes the filling in of the Hudson River in Hudson County, New Jersey and the erection of permanent pile-supported structures thereon if the Secretary of the Army, acting through the Chief of Engineers, finds that a declaration that this location is non-navigable is in the public interest.

Terminates the authorization of the Gaysville Dam and Lake project, Stockbridge, Chittenden, and Rochester, Vermont.

Permits the Washington Suburban Sanitary Commission to construct a water diversion structure from the North Shore of the Potomac River at the Washington Suburban Sanitary Commission water filtration plant to the north shore of Watkins Island.

Authorizes the Secretary of the Army, acting through the Chief of Engineers, to undertake projects for the collection and removal of drift and debris from publicly maintained commercial boat harbors and from land and water areas immediately adjacent thereto. Provides that the Federal share of the cost of any project developed will be two-thirds and that the remainder shall be paid by the State, municipality, or other political subdivision in which the project is to be located.

== Other acts of P.L. 94-587 ==
- Lake Ontario Protection Act - directs the Secretary of the Army, acting through the Chief of Engineers, to develop a plan for shoreline protection and beach erosion control along Lake Ontario, and report on such plan to the Congress.
- Alaska Hydroelectric Power Development Act - establishes an Alaska Hydroelectric Power Development Fund in the Treasury of the United States from which the Secretary of the Army may make expenditures for the phase I design memorandum stage of advanced engineering and design for qualified hydroelectric power generator projects in Alaska. Authorizes the Secretary to make expenditures from non-Federal funds deposited in the fund as advances against construction costs. States that no funds specifically authorized for any project in this Act will be available for expenditures prior to fiscal year 1978.

== See also ==
- Flood Control Act
- Rivers and Harbors Act
