= Water Resources Development Act of 1974 =

- Long title: An Act to provide for the water ecological infrastructure and public works development on rivers and harbors, and for other purposes.
- Enacted by: the 93rd United States Congress

Citations
- Public law: Pub. L. 93-251
- Statutes at Large: 88 Stat. 12

Legislative history
- Introduced in the House as H.R. 10203 by By John Blatnik on September 12, 1973; Signed into law by President Richard Nixon on March 7, 1974

The Water Resource Development Act of 1974, is part of Pub. L. 93–251 enacted on March 7, 1974, enacted by Congress, which also included the Streambank Erosion Control Evaluation and Demonstration Act and the River Basin Monetary Authorization Act.

== WRDA 1974 ==
WRDA 1974 amended Section 208 of the Flood Control Act of 1954 Pub. L. 83–780, amended Section 205 of the Flood Control Act of 1948 Pub. L. 80–858, and made changes in the scope of authority for reservoir projects, and authorized $94,000,000 for the Columbia River Basin comprehensive plan of development.

It authorized the Secretary of the Army, acting through the Corps of Engineers, to undertake the design, construction, repair, improvement, and modification of specified public works on rivers and harbors for navigation, flood control and other enumerated purposes. Authorizes appropriations to carry out such projects.

It also directed the Secretary of the Army to conduct navigational and flood-control projects on specified public works and authorized appropriations to carry out such projects.

=== Authorities ===
LOCAL COOPERATION, STUDY; REPORT TO CONGRESS Pub. L. 93-251, title I, Sec. 24, Mar. 7, 1974, 88 Stat. 20, provided that the Secretary of the Army make a study of the items of local cooperation involving hold and save harmless provisions which have been required for water resource development projects under his jurisdiction and report on such study to Congress not later than June 30, 1975.

LAND AND WATER USE, STUDY; REPORT TO CONGRESS Pub. L. 93-251, title I, Sec. 25, Mar. 7, 1974, 88 Stat. 20, provided that the Secretary of the Army conduct a study on land use practices and recreational uses at water resource development projects under his jurisdiction and report on such study to Congress not later than June 30, 1975.

NATIONAL STREAMBANK EROSION PREVENTION AND CONTROL DEMONSTRATION PROGRAM Pub. L. 93-251, title I, Sec. 32, Mar. 7, 1974, 88 Stat. 21, as amended by Pub. L. 94-587, Sec. 155, 161, Oct. 22, 1976, 90 Stat. 2932, 2933, known as the Streambank Erosion Control Evaluation and Demonstration Act of 1974, directed the Secretary of the Army, acting through the Chief of Engineers, to establish and conduct for a period of five fiscal years a national streambank erosion prevention and control demonstration program, to consist of an evaluation of the extent of streambank erosion on navigable rivers and their tributaries; development of new methods and techniques for bank protection, research on soil stability, and identification of the causes of erosion; a report to the Congress on the results of such studies and the recommendations of the Secretary of the Army on means for the prevention and correction of streambank erosion; and demonstration projects, including bank protection works. The final report to the Congress was to be made by Secretary of the Army no later than Dec. 31, 1981.

NATIONAL SHORELINE EROSION CONTROL DEVELOPMENT AND DEMONSTRATION PROGRAM Pub. L. 93-251, title I, Sec. 54, Mar. 7, 1974, 88 Stat. 26, known as the Shoreline Erosion Control Demonstration Act of 1974, directed the Secretary of the Army, acting through the Chief of Engineers, to establish and conduct for a period of five fiscal years a national shoreline erosion control development and demonstration program, to consist of planning, constructing, operating, evaluating, and demonstrating prototype shoreline erosion control devices, both engineered and vegetative, and to be carried out in cooperation with the Secretary of Agriculture, particularly with respect to vegetative means of preventing and controlling shoreline erosion, and in cooperation with Federal, State, and local agencies, private organizations, and the Shoreline Erosion Advisory Panel established pursuant to section 54(d) of Pub. L. 93-251. The Panel was to expire ninety days after termination of the five-year program. The Secretary of the Army was to submit to Congress a final report, sixty days after the fifth fiscal year of funding, such report to include a comprehensive evaluation of the national shoreline erosion control development and demonstration program. TECHNICAL AND ENGINEERING ASSISTANCE FOR NON-DEVELOPMENT OF EROSION PREVENTION METHODS Pub. L. 93-251, title I, Sec. 55, Mar. 7, 1974, 88 Stat. 28, provided that: The Secretary of the Army, acting through the Chief of Engineers, is authorized to provide technical and engineering assistance to non-Federal public interests in developing structural and non-structural methods of preventing damages attributable to shore and streambank erosion. VISITOR PROTECTION SERVICES, STUDY; REPORT TO CONGRESS Pub. L. 93-251, title I, Sec. 75, Mar. 7, 1974, 88 Stat. 32, directed Secretary of the Army to conduct a study on need for and means of providing visitor protection services at water resource development projects under jurisdiction of Department of the Army and report on such study to Congress not later than Dec. 31, 1974.

== Other acts of P.L. 93-251 ==
=== The Streambank Erosion Control Evaluation and Demonstration Act ===
Authorized and directed the Secretary of the Army, acting through the Chief of Engineers, to establish and conduct for a period of five fiscal years a national streambank erosion prevention and control demonstration program. It provided that the program shall consist of: (1) an evaluation of the extent of streambank erosion on navigable rivers and their tributaries; (2) development of new methods and techniques for bank protection, research on soil stability, and identification of the causes of erosion; (3) a report to the Congress on the results of such studies and the recommendations of the Secretary of the Army on means for the prevention and correction of streambank erosion; and (4) demonstration projects, including bank protection works.

It also required that demonstration projects authorized by this section shall be undertaken on streams selected to reflect a variety of geographical and environmental conditions, including streams with naturally occurring erosion problems and streams with erosion caused or increased by manmade structures or activities.

Provides for the establishment of a Shoreline Erosion Advisory Panel. Sets forth the duties of such Panel. Authorized an appropriation of $8,000,000 for construction of such projects.

=== River Basin Monetary Authorization Act ===
Authorized specified amounts to be appropriated for the prosecution of development plans on enumerated river basins. States that such sums shall not exceed $764,000,000. Among those projects was the Columbia River Basin comprehensive plan of development, which was authorized $94,000,000.

== See also ==
- Flood Control Act
- Rivers and Harbors Act
