= Rivers and Harbors Act =

US laws affecting riverine navigation

Rivers and Harbors Acts
- Other short titles: Rivers and Harbors Appropriation Act of 1899
- Long title: An Act making appropriations for the construction, repair, and preservation of certain public works on rivers and harbors, and for other purposes.
- Acronyms (colloquial): RHA
- Nicknames: Refuse Act (1899 Provision)
- Enacted by: the 55th United States Congress
- Effective: March 3, 1899 (Core Codification)

Citations
- Statutes at Large: 30 Stat. 1121 (1899 Core); 4 Stat. 32 (1824 Act); 38 Stat. 1049 (1915 Act)

Codification
- Titles amended: 33 U.S.C.: Navigable Waters
- U.S.C. sections created: 33 U.S.C. ch. 9, subch. I § 407

Legislative history
- Introduced in the House as H.R. 11795 (1899 Act) by Theodore E. Burton (1899 Act); Committee consideration by House Committee on Rivers and Harbors; Passed the House on; Passed the Senate on; Signed into law by President William McKinley (1899 Core) on March 3, 1899

Major amendments
- Clean Water Act (Section 404 overlap)

United States Supreme Court cases
- Wisconsin v. Illinois, 278 U.S. 367 (1929); United States v. Republic Steel Corp., 362 U.S. 482 (1960)

Rivers and Harbors Act may refer to one of many pieces of legislation and appropriations passed by the United States Congress since the first such legislation in 1824. At that time Congress appropriated $75,000 to improve navigation on the Ohio and Mississippi rivers by removing sandbars, snags, and other obstacles. Like when first passed, the legislation was to be administered by the United States Army Corps of Engineers (USACE), under its Chief Engineer and the Secretary of War (more recently the Secretary of the Army).

In a landmark case, the Supreme Court ruled in Gibbons v. Ogden that federal authority covered interstate commerce including riverine navigation, under the Commerce Clause of the Constitution. This ruling in large part ended considerable divisiveness regarding transportation improvements between those supporting Federalism versus States rights advocates. Shortly thereafter (April, 1824), the General Survey Act authorized the president to have surveys made of routes for roads and canals "of national importance, in a commercial or military point of view, or necessary for the transportation of public mail." The President assigned responsibility for the surveys to the Corps of Engineers. To broaden the scope of possible improvements, Congress passed the first federal rivers and harbors legislation in May, again with the USACE charged to administer the work.

New river and harbor legislation in 1826, authorized the president to have river surveys made to clean out and deepen selected waterways and to make various other river and harbor improvements. That year Congress also authorized the first survey for a canal between Atlantic Ocean and Gulf of Mexico, and expanded the Army engineers' workload. Although the 1824 act to improve the Mississippi and Ohio rivers is often called the first rivers and harbors legislation, the 1826 act was the first to combine authorizations for both surveys and the projects themselves, thereby establishing a pattern that continues to the present day.

== Early legislation ==
Many of the early river and harbor legislation included authorizations for initial surveys of the navigation safety of rivers then used for transportation; as these were developed, authorizations for specific improvements were added. Many of these improvements were driven by the rapid growth in the use of steamboats on inland waters and the great commercial success of the Erie Canal, financed solely by the state of New York.

In 1828 the Corps conducted an initial survey of the Tennessee River, and in 1829 the first steam-powered snagboat was launched at New Albany, Indiana, on the Ohio River. The Cumberland River in Tennessee and Kentucky was authorized for development in 1832, and the Hudson River in New York was authorized in 1834. While other works were being implemented by the individual states, the panic of 1837 led to a near collapse of federal waterway improvement program. In 1852 the Tennessee River was authorized for development, as was the Illinois Waterway, downstream of the state-constructed Illinois and Michigan Canal. While the federal government and the Corps concentrated on navigable rivers, it also assisted in canal work, mostly constructed by individual states. For example, the River and Harbor Act of August 11, 1858, pursuant to the report of the engineers, provides $102,000 for improving the Muskingum River in Ohio with construction of a lock at Taylorsville and the reconstruction of the lock at Zanesville. It also includes an early reference to water power associated with, and subservient to, the water's usage for navigation. The act includes that the Secretary of War is (hereby) authorized and empowered to grant leases or licenses for the use of the water powers on the Muskingum River at such rate and on such conditions and for such periods of time as may seem to him just, equitable, and expedient. Provided, that the leases or licenses shall be limited to the use of the surplus water not required for navigation, and he is also empowered to grant leases or licenses for the occupation of such lands belonging to the United States on the Muskingum River as may be required for mill-sites or for other purposes not inconsistent with the requirements of navigation. All moneys received under such leases or licenses shall be turned into the Treasury of the United States, and the itemized statement shall accompany the annual report of the Chief of Engineers. But nothing in this act shall be construed to affect any vested rights, if such there be, of any lessee of water power on said river.

The Civil War ended civil works on rivers and harbors from 1861.

== (Partial) List of early Acts ==
- An Act to improve the navigation of the Ohio and Mississippi rivers. (4 Stat. 32), passed May 24, 1824, appropriating $75,000.

== Later legislation ==
Following the Civil War, railroads became recipients of federal funding; funding for river and harbor improvements increased sharply. The 1869 appropriations for rivers and harbors exceeded $2 million, and rapidly grew to tens of millions of dollars per year by the close of the 19th century; the Rivers and Harbors Acts between 1869 and 1930 are illustrative. Each of these acts identifies hundreds of projects to be built by the Secretary of War under the supervision of the Army Corps of Engineers. The pattern established the Corps' close connection to civil works construction.

Gifford Pinchot observed that, "Under the powers granted or applied in the Constitution of the United States, the federal government has control over navigatable rivers and their tributaries. Yet for a hundred years after the Constitution was adopted, Congress left the regulation of water power entirely to the states... Federal stream legislation at its beginning had to do chiefly with preventing or removing obstructions to navigation." This changed over the later periods, with the construction of dams and locks for greater navigation improvement. With the advent of Edison's DC light bulb the early 1880s, and the later use of AC, with its superior ability to be transmitted great distances, the demand for electricity rose rapidly. Starting about this time, river and harbor legislation had to deal with a proliferation of hydroelectric plants and other competing modern multipurpose improvements.

The Rivers and Harbors Appropriation Act of 1899, like earlier appropriations acts, began with a long list of navigational improvement projects (section 1), funded a survey program for said projects (section 2) and authorized the President to "make full and complete investigation of the Isthmus of Panama" with a view to constructing the Panama Canal (section 3). Section 9 of the act established congressional authority over bridges, dams, dikes, and causeways and Section 10 established authority over un-authorized obstructions in navigable waters and requires authorization for "any wharf, pier, dolphin, boom, weir, breakwater, bulkhead, jetty, or other structures". The depositing of refuse in navigable waters is forbidden in Section 13, with provisos and permits as exceptions. Additional sections address the use or alteration of various public works related to navigation, anchored or sunken vessels, and surveys for improvements to existing harbors. This act is the basis for some U.S. Army Corps of Engineers permit requirements.

== List of later acts ==
- "Act to Improve Rivers and Harbors for fiscal year ending June 30, 1869 and 1870", (16 Stat. 44), passed April 10, 1869, appropriating $2 million.
- "Act to Improve Rivers and Harbors for fiscal year ending June 30, 1871", (16 Stat. 223), passed July 11, 1870, includes $3.9 million appropriated for a long list of projects specified for completion and Congress identifies particular projects across the nation. This act begins the age of dam construction on the inland rivers. Prior to this act, all river improvements had been directed toward enhancing the existing channel by removing obstructions and redirecting flows with dikes or weirs. With this act, dams and locks began to be constructed that raised the level of the river in an effort to deepen the river for larger vessels and provide deep water during drought conditions. Work on the Warrior-Tombigbee River in Alabama is authorized for development; in 1872 the Monongahela River in Pennsylvania, the Houston Ship Channel, and the Delaware River are authorized for development.
- "Act to Improve Rivers and Harbors for fiscal year ending June 30, 1873", (17 Stat. 370), passed June 10, 1872, appropriating $5.8 million. The Kanawha River in West Virginia is authorized for development, and Congress authorized the first survey of inland waterway west of Mississippi.
- "Act to Improve Rivers and Harbors", (18 Stat. 237), passed June 23, 1874, appropriating $5.15 million.
- "Act to Improve Rivers and Harbors", (19 Stat. 132), passed August 14, 1876, concerning (South Pass/Eads), as well as the authorization for development of the Missouri River, and the San Joaquin River in California.
- "Act to Improve Rivers and Harbors", (20 Stat. 152), passed June 18, 1878.
- "Act to Improve Rivers and Harbors", (21 Stat. 180), passed June 14, 1880.
- "Act to Improve Rivers and Harbors", (21 Stat. 468), passed March 3, 1881.
- River and Harbor Act of 1882, an appropriations act (like the next in 1884), signaled congressional intent to improve waterways to benefit nation by promoting competition amongst transportation modes (particularly railroads). It was the first act passed by Congress to combine appropriations for development of nation's waterways with a reaffirmation of the policy of freedom from tolls and other user charges; that policy had been established almost one hundred years earlier, before the Constitution, by the Northwest Ordinance. The act was passed over President Arthur's veto.
- River and Harbor Act of 1884, (23 Stat. 133), passed July 5, 1884. This appropriations act authorized the James River in Virginia for development, and made the first appropriation for improving the Black Warrior River. Preventing and removing obstructions to navigation was also a purpose of this act, for it authorized the Secretary of War to remove unauthorized obstructions to navigation, including dams, bridges and causeways."
- River and Harbor Act of 1886, (24 Stat. 310), passed August 5, 1886, authorized the Allegheny River in Pennsylvania for development. A year earlier the Corps of Engineers completed their first lock built at Davis Island near Pittsburgh.
- River and Harbor Act of 1888, (25 Stat. 400), passed August 11, 1888, authorized the Green and Barren rivers in Kentucky for development; in 1889 the Columbia River on the Washington-Oregon border is similarly authorized.
- River and Harbor Act of 1890 (26 Stat. 426), again tightened restrictions on unauthorized obstructions to navigation. This act forbade "the creation of any obstructions, not affirmatively authorized by law, to the navigable capacity of any waters, in respect of which the United States has jurisdiction." The act also required that dam sites and development plans on navigable rivers be approved by the Secretary of War and the Corps of Engineers before construction.
- River and Harbor Act of 1892, (27 Stat. 88), passed July 12, 1892.
- River and Harbor Act of 1894, (28 Stat. 338), passed August 18, 1894.
- River and Harbor Act of 1896, (29 Stat. 202), passed June 3, 1896.
- Rivers and Harbors Appropriation Act of 1899, "An Act Making appropriations for the construction, repair, and preservation of certain public works on rivers and harbors, and for other purposes", Mar. 3, 1899, ch. 425, 30 Stat. 1121, is the oldest federal environmental law in the United States; this act also made it illegal to dam navigable streams without a license (or permit) from Congress; this included for the purposes of hydroelectric generation, at a time when the electric utility industry was expanding rapidly.
- River and Harbor Act of 1902, (32 Stat. 331), passed June 13, 1902.
- River and Harbor Act of 1905, (33 Stat. 1117), passed March 3, 1905.
- River and Harbor Act of 1907, (34 Stat. 1073), passed March 2, 1907.
- River and Harbor Act of 1909, (35 Stat. 815), passed March 3, 1909, set national policy for an intracoastal waterway from Boston to the Rio Grande.
- River and Harbor Act of 1910, June 25, 1910, ch. 382, 36 Stat. 630, authorized a 9-foot x 100 ft channel on the Gulf Intracoastal Waterway between the Apalachicola River and St. Andrew Bay, Florida, as well as a study of the most efficient means to move cargo.
- River and Harbor Act of 1911, Feb. 27, 1911, ch. 166, 36 Stat. 933
- River and Harbor Act of 1912, July 25, 1912, ch. 253, 37 Stat. 201
- Rivers and Harbors Act of 1913, appropriated money for various Congressional river and harbor improvement projects, the most prominent of which was Indiana Harbor, Indiana
- River and Harbor Act of 1914, Oct. 2, 1914, ch. 313, 38 Stat. 725
- Rivers and Harbors Appropriation Act of 1915, establishment of anchorage grounds and harbor regulations generally, codified in 33 USC 471.
- River and Harbor Act of 1916, July 27, 1916, ch. 260, 39 Stat. 391
- River and Harbor Act of 1917, Aug. 8, 1917, ch. 49, 40 Stat. 250
- River and Harbor Act of 1918, July 18, 1918, ch. 155, 40 Stat. 904
- River and Harbor Act of 1919, Mar. 2, 1919, ch. 95, 40 Stat. 1275
- River and Harbor Act of 1920, June 5, 1920, ch. 252, 41 Stat. 1009
- River and Harbor Act of 1922, Sept. 22, 1922, ch. 427, 42 Stat. 1038
- River and Harbor Act of 1925, (43 Stat 1186), passed March 3, 1925, ordered the Corps of Engineers to determine the cost to do surveys of the nation's rivers and recommend ways to improve them.
- River and Harbor Act of 1927, passed January 21, 1927, ordered the Corps of Engineers to conduct the surveys costed out in RHA1925. It also directed the Corps to build a dam at Hastings, Minnesota, to increase the water depth of the Mississippi River to 9 feet in spite of the fact that the Chief of Engineers General Taylor refused to say whether the cost was commensurate with the benefit gained.
- River and Harbor Act of 1930, July 3, 1930, ch. 847, 46 Stat. 918
- Rivers and Harbors Act of 1935, Pub. L. 74–409, was passed August 30, 1935, after months of debate. Although other projects were included with then-standard documentation, the House of Representatives had insisted on voting separately for Grand Coulee and Parker dams. These dams were planned for broader purposes and different funding, which include "controlling floods, improving navigation, regulating the flow of the streams of the United States, providing for storage and for the delivery of the stored waters thereof, for the reclamation of public lands and Indian reservations, and other beneficial uses, and for the generation of electric energy as a means of financially aiding and assisting such undertakings..."
- River and Harbor Act of 1936, Pub. L. 74–738, better known as the Flood Control Act of 1936, established a nationwide policy for flood control, provided by the Federal Government in cooperation with local entities.
- River and Harbor Act of 1938, Pub. L. 75–685, June 20, 1938, Authorizing the construction, repair, and preservation of certain public works on rivers and harbors, and for other purposes, the most significant being construction of the Bonneville Dam in the Columbia River.
- River and Harbor Act of 1940, Pub. L. 76–868, October 17, 1940, authorizing improvements of certain rivers and harbors in the interest of national defense and for other purposes.
- Rivers and Harbors Act of 1945, Pub. L. 79–14, March 2, 1945
- Rivers and Harbors Act of 1946, Pub. L. 79–525, July 24, 1946
- Rivers and Harbors Act of 1948, Pub. L. 80–858, June 30, 1948
- Rivers and Harbors Act of 1950, Pub. L. 81–516, May 17, 1950
- River and Harbor Act of 1954, Title 1 of Pub. L. 83–780, September 3, 1954, Authorizing and appropriated funds for the construction, repair, and preservation of certain public works on rivers and harbors for navigation, flood control, and for other purposes, to include beach erosion. Title 2 of PL 83-780 was the Flood Control Act of 1954.
- Rivers and Harbors Act of 1956, Pub. L. 84–455, March 29, 1956, authorized (among other things) the construction of the Mississippi River Gulf Outlet Canal, a shortcut between the Mississippi River and the Gulf of Mexico. MRGO has been considered a contributory factor in the flooding of New Orleans during Hurricane Katrina.
- River and Harbor Act of 1958, Pub. L. 85–500, July 3, 1958
- Rivers and Harbors Act of 1960, Pub. L. 86–845, July 14, 1960
- Rivers and Harbors Act of 1962, Pub. L. 87–874, October 23, 1962
- Rivers and Harbors Act of 1965, Pub. L. 89–298, October 27, 1965
- River and Harbor Act of 1966, Pub. L. 89–789, November 7, 1966, authorizing navigation and beach erosion projects.It also created an Interstate Compact between Illinois and Missouri for a commission for the Jefferson-Monroe Bridge and an Interstate Compact between Kansas and Oklahoma on the Arkansas River. Title 2 of PL 89-789 was the Flood Control Act of 1966.
- River and Harbor Act of 1968, Pub. L. 90–483
- River and Harbor Act of 1970, Pub. L. 91–611, December 31, 1970

NOTE: Titling of these acts over the years has been inconsistent. If the act itself is not self-titled, the convention used here ("River and Harbor Act of 19xx") is only for consistency of reference only with the US Code in the recognized database at the Legal Information Institute at Cornell University.

== See also ==
- Flood Control Act
- Water Resources Development Act
- Watershed Protection and Flood Prevention Act of 1954
