= Goethals =

Goethals is a Dutch surname originating in Flanders. It seems to be derived from Goedaels, meaning "good ale", and, equivalent to the English and German surnames Goodale and Gutbier, would have referred to a brewer. People with the surname include:

- Angela Goethals (born 1977), American actress
- Christian Goethals (1928–2003), Belgian racing driver
- Félix Goethals (1891–1962), French road bicycle racer
- Félix Victor Goethals (1798–1872), Belgian historian, librarian and genealogist
- George Washington Goethals (1858–1928), American army officer and civil engineer
- Guy Goethals (born 1952), Belgian football referee
- Henry Goethals (c.1217–1293), Flemish scholastic philosopher
- Lucien Goethals (1931–2006), Belgian composer
- Paul Goethals (1832–1901), Belgian Jesuit priest, first Catholic archbishop of Calcutta
- Pieter Goethals (1826–1860), Flemish victim of judicial error, beheaded for a murder he did not commit
- Raymond Goethals (1921–2004), Belgian football coach
- Robert Goethals (1922–2011), Belgian football coach
- Thomás Goethals (born 1983), Dutch/Mexican DJ

== Named after George Washington Goethals ==
- Goethals Bridge in New York City
- Goethals Medal, awarded by the Society of American Military Engineers
- USS General G. W. Goethals and USNS George W. Goethals, US Navy ships
- Goethals (dredge) US Army ocean-going hopper dredger

== Named after Paul Goethals ==
- Goethals Memorial School, administered by the Congregation of Christian Brothers in India
