= Battle of Saint-Mihiel =

1918 Battle of the First World War

- Part of the Western Front of World War I
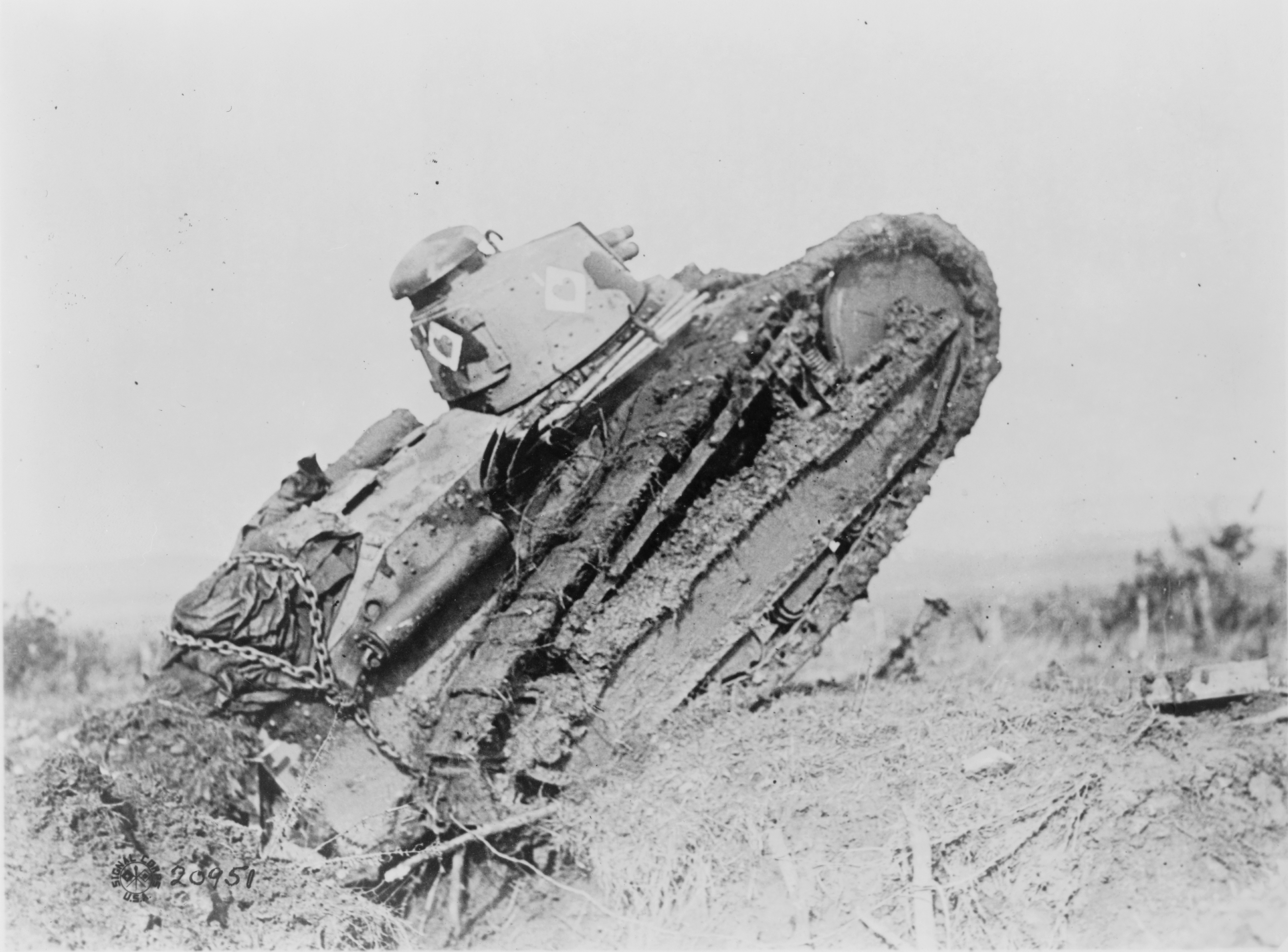
- A Renault FT tank ploughing its way through a trench and starting toward the German line near Saint Mihiel, France.
Date	12–16 September 1918
Location	Saint-Mihiel salient, France 48°53′21″N 05°32′37″E
Result	Allied victory

Belligerents
United States; France	German Empire; Austria-Hungary

Commanders and leaders
(United States) John J. Pershing (United States) Hunter Liggett (United States) Joseph T. Dickman (United States) George H. Cameron (French Third Republic) Ernest Joseph Blondlat	(German Empire) Max von Gallwitz (German Empire) Georg Fuchs (German Empire) Eduard von Below (Austria-Hungary) Ludwig Goiginger

Units involved
(United States) First Army: (United States) I Corps; (United States) IV Corps; (United States) V Corps; (French Third Republic) II Colonial Corps (French Third Republic) Division Aérienne	(German Empire) 5th Army

Strength
(United States) : 216,000 personnel 144 tanks (French Third Republic) : 110,000 personnel 275 tanks 1,481 aircraft 2,900 artillery pieces	(German Empire) : 75,000 personnel 213 aircraft

Casualties and losses
7,000	22,500 (2,000 KIA, 5,500 WIA, 15,000 POW); 450 guns captured

The Battle of Saint-Mihiel was a major World War I battle fought from 12 to 16 September 1918, involving the American Expeditionary Forces (AEF) and 110,000 French troops under the command of General John J. Pershing of the United States against German positions. The U.S. Army Air Service played a significant role in this action.

This battle marked the first use of the terms "D-Day" and "H-Hour" by the Americans.

The attack at the Saint-Mihiel salient was part of a plan by Pershing in which he hoped that the Americans would break through the German lines and capture the fortified city of Metz. It was the first large offensive launched mainly by the United States Army in World War I, and the attack caught the Germans in the process of retreating. This meant that their artillery was out of place and the American attack, coming up against disorganized German forces, proved more successful than expected. The Saint-Mihiel attack demonstrated the critical role of artillery during World War I and the difficulty of supplying such massive armies while they were on the move. The U.S. attack faltered as artillery and food supplies were left behind on the muddy roads. The attack on Metz was not realized, as the Supreme Allied Commander Ferdinand Foch ordered the American troops to march towards Sedan and Mézières, which would lead to the Meuse–Argonne offensive.

== Background: The Saint-Mihiel salient ==
Saint-Mihiel is a town in the Meuse department in northeastern France. After the end of the 1870–71 Franco-Prussian War, the town was no longer considered important strategically, and France did not develop military installations. This changed early in World War I, when the town was inside the battlefront.

In 1914, the German command wished to take the Verdun fortifications, which formed a strong point in the French lines. A first attempt, at Bois-le-Pretre (Priesterwald in German), failed, despite violent fighting. During two more attempts (Battle of Flirey), German troops took Saint-Mihiel and Fort du Camp-des-Romains, but they were ultimately stopped at Fort de Troyon to the south of Verdun.

During the course of the war, the front did not change much in this area. Saint-Mihiel formed a salient inside the French lines, blocking communications between Nancy and Verdun. The area near St. Mihiel suffered much fighting:

- The Crête des Éparges (Les Éparges crest): February–April 1915.
- At the Bois d'Ailly (Ailly Wood) and the Tranchée de la Soif (Trench of Thirst): isolated behind German lines, Commander d'André's men fought three days without food or water before surrendering in May 1915.
- At Bois Brûlé (The Burned Forest), the French suffered many casualties when German conquered a redoubt in December 1914. It was here that the sub-officer Jacques Péricard pronounced the famous words: "Debout les morts!" (Dead men, arise!) on 8 April 1915.
- The forêt d'Apremont (Apremont forest), the Tête à vache (Cow's head) trenches, Calonne trenches...

In spite of French attacks, the German forces were able to retain this strategic location until the last months of the war.

== Prelude ==
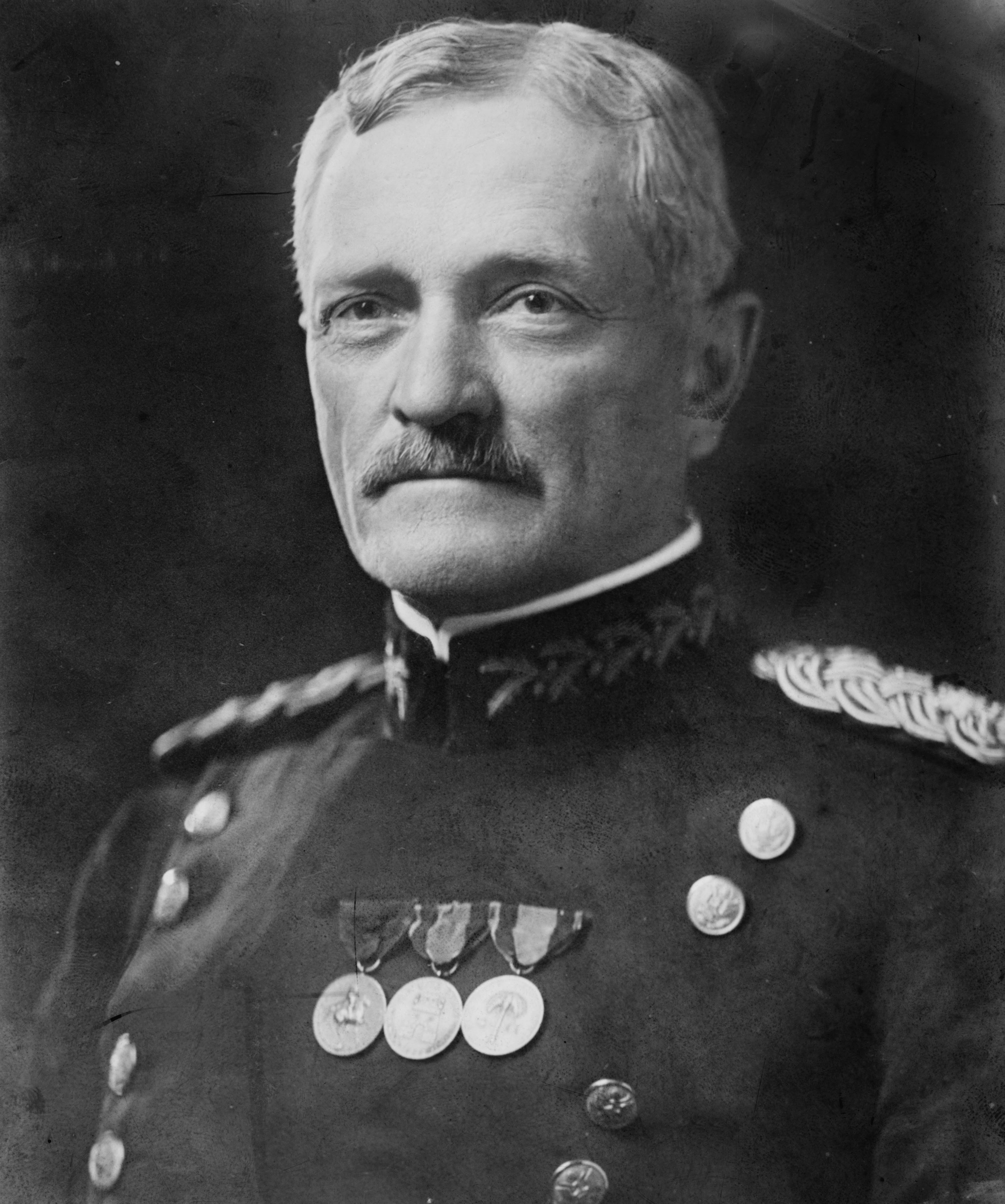
General Pershing

General John Pershing thought that a successful Allied attack in the region of St. Mihiel, Metz, and Verdun would have a significant effect on the German Army. General Pershing was also aware that the area's terrain setting first dictated that the restricted rail and road communications into Verdun (restrictions that had been imposed by the German attack during the Battle of Flirey) be cleared, and that a continuation of the attack to capture the Germany railroad center at Metz would be devastating to the Germans. For this, he placed his confidence in a young First Infantry Division Major, George Marshall, to move troops and supplies effectively throughout the battle. After these goals were accomplished, the Americans could launch offensives into Germany proper. The American First Army had been activated in August and taken over the sector of the Allied line. Pershing had to persuade Marshal Foch (the supreme Allied military commander) to permit an American attack on the salient.

=== Weather reports ===
The weather corps of Corps I Operation Order stated: "Visibility: Heavy driving wind and rain during parts of day and night. Roads: Very muddy." This would pose a challenge to the Americans when the order to advance was given. In some parts of the road, the men were almost knee-deep in mud and water. After five days of rain, the ground was nearly impassable to both the American tanks and infantry. Many of the tanks were wrecked by water leaking into their engines, while others got stuck in mud flows. Some of the infantrymen developed early stages of trench foot, even before the trenches were dug.

=== German defensive positions ===
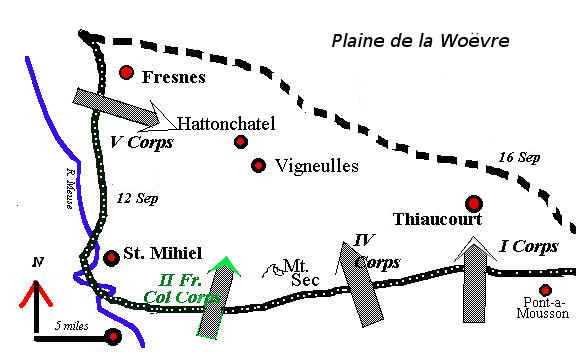
Map of the Battle

Prior to the American operation, the Germans installed many in-depth series of trenches, wire obstacles, and machine-gun nests. The battlefields' terrain included the nearby premises of three villages: Vigneulles, Thiaucourt, and Hannonville-sous-les-Cotes. Their capture would accelerate the envelopment of the German divisions near St. Mihiel. The American forces planned to breach the trenches and then advance along the enemy's logistical road network.

The Germans knew many details about the Allied offensive campaign coming against them. One Swiss newspaper had published the date, time, and duration of the preparatory barrage. However, the German Army stationed in the area of St. Mihiel lacked sufficient manpower, firepower and effective leadership to launch a counter-attack of its own against the Allies. With Allied offensives to the north, the Germans decided to pull out of the St. Mihiel Salient and consolidate their forces near the Hindenburg Line. The order to evacuate the area was given on 8 September. The Allied forces discovered the information on a written order to Army Group Gallwitz.

=== Allied tank support ===
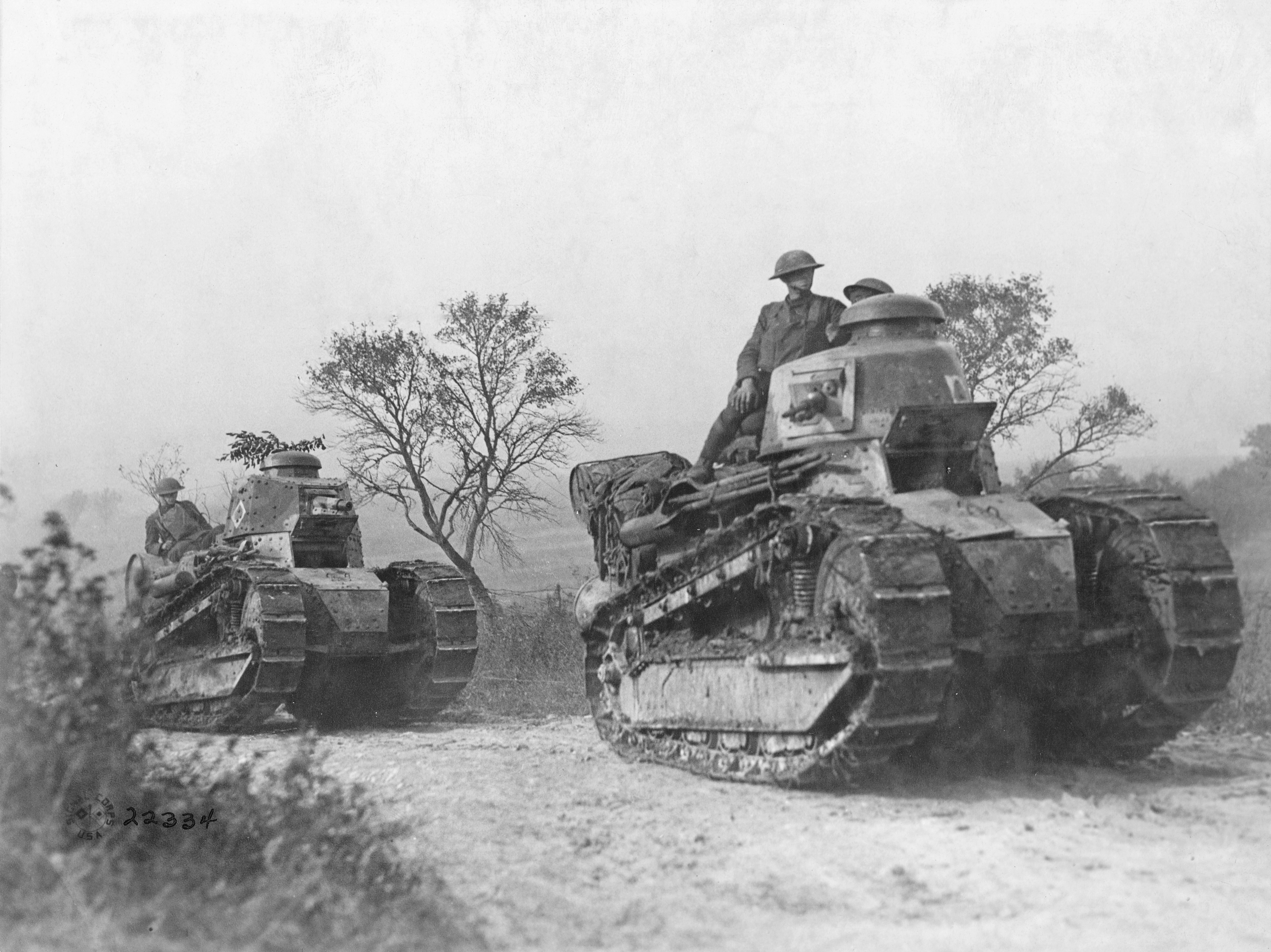
Renault FT (FT-17) Tanks in late September 1918.

Although the AEF was new to the French theater of war, it trained hard for nearly a year in preparation for fighting against the German armies. In June 1917 Pershing ordered the creation of a tank force to support the AEF's infantry. As a result, by September 1918, Lieutenant Colonel George S. Patton Jr. had finished training two tank battalions – 144 French-built Renault FT light tanks organized as the 344th and 345th Battalions of the United States Tank Corps – at Langres, France for an upcoming offensive at the St. Mihiel salient. "Due to the serious resistance of the enemy, especially along the eastern edge of the FORET d’ARGONNE and in the vicinity of CHEPPY and VARENNES, and due also the lack of support of the Infantry, all the Tanks had contrary to plan entered the action before evening of the first day. The 344th Battalion left the positions of departure and advanced ahead of the Infantry at H-hour (5:30 a.m.) On the morning of the 26th, Colonel G. S. Patton, Jr., commanding the Brigade of Tanks, was wounded while getting Tanks forward and rallying disorganized Infantrymen to attack enemy resistance. Major Sereno E. Brett, commanding the 344th Battalion, was then placed in command of the Brigade." Patton was awarded the Distinguished Service Cross for his "extraordinary heroism" that day. In addition to the 144 AEF tanks, the attack was joined by 275 French tanks (216 FTs and 59 Schneider CA1 and Saint-Chamond tanks) of the French 1st Assault Artillery Brigade; a total of 419 tanks.

=== Allied air support ===
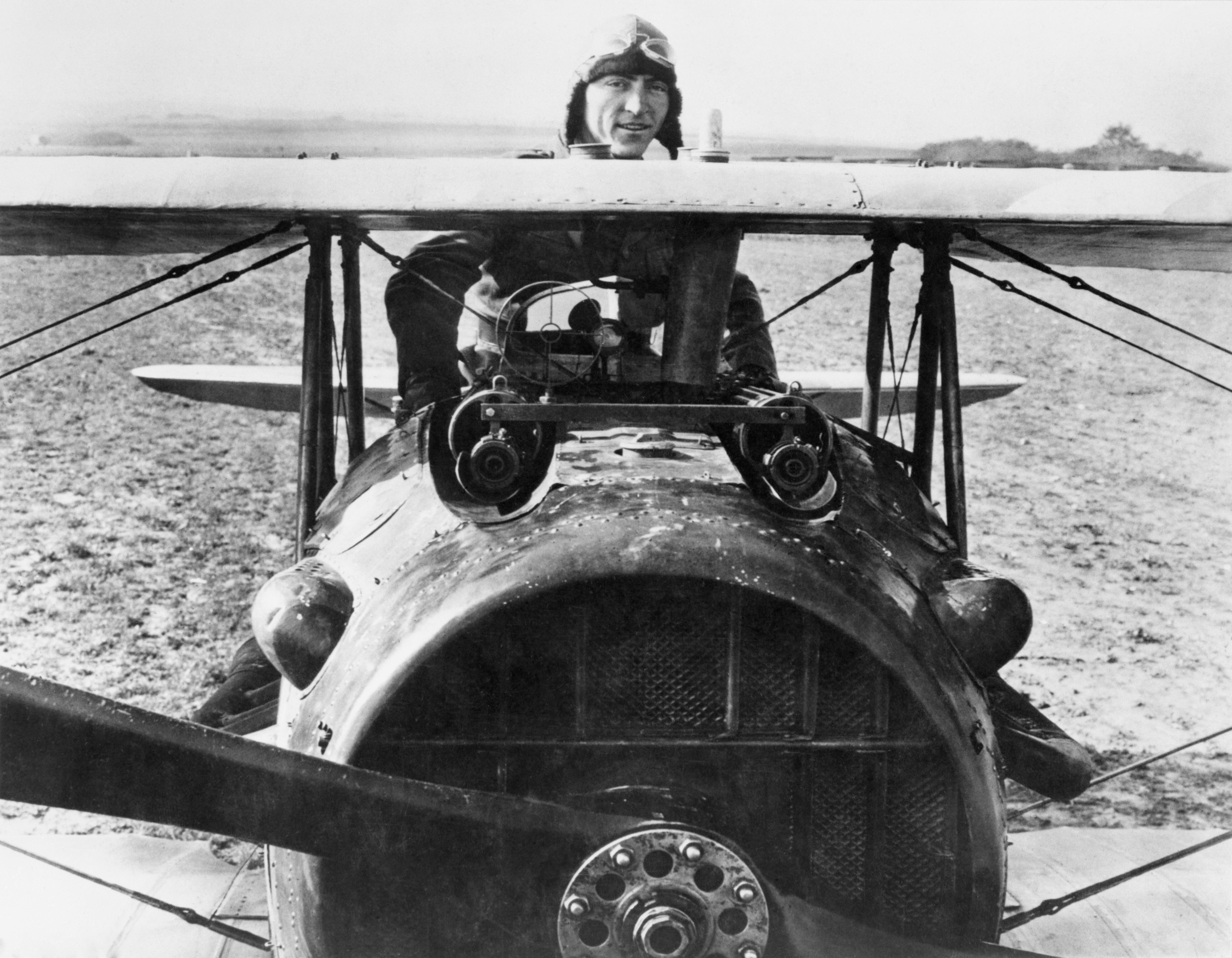
Lieutenant Eddie Rickenbacker at St. Mihiel.

Chief of the United States Army Air Service Mason Patrick oversaw the organization of 28 air squadrons for the battle, with the French, British, and Italians contributing additional units to bring the total force numbers to 701 pursuit planes, 366 observation planes, 323 day bombers, and 91 night bombers. The 1,481 total aircraft made it the largest air operation of the war. The French Army engaged the newly created Division Aérienne (Air Division), under command of General Duval, with a strength of 717 planes (24 fight squadron / 432 SPAD VII, 15 Close Air Support squadron / 225 BREGUET XIV, 4 reconnaissance squadron / 60 CAUDRON R XI). Five French fighter groups and 3 US Army fighter / bomber groups were also engaged.

== Battle ==
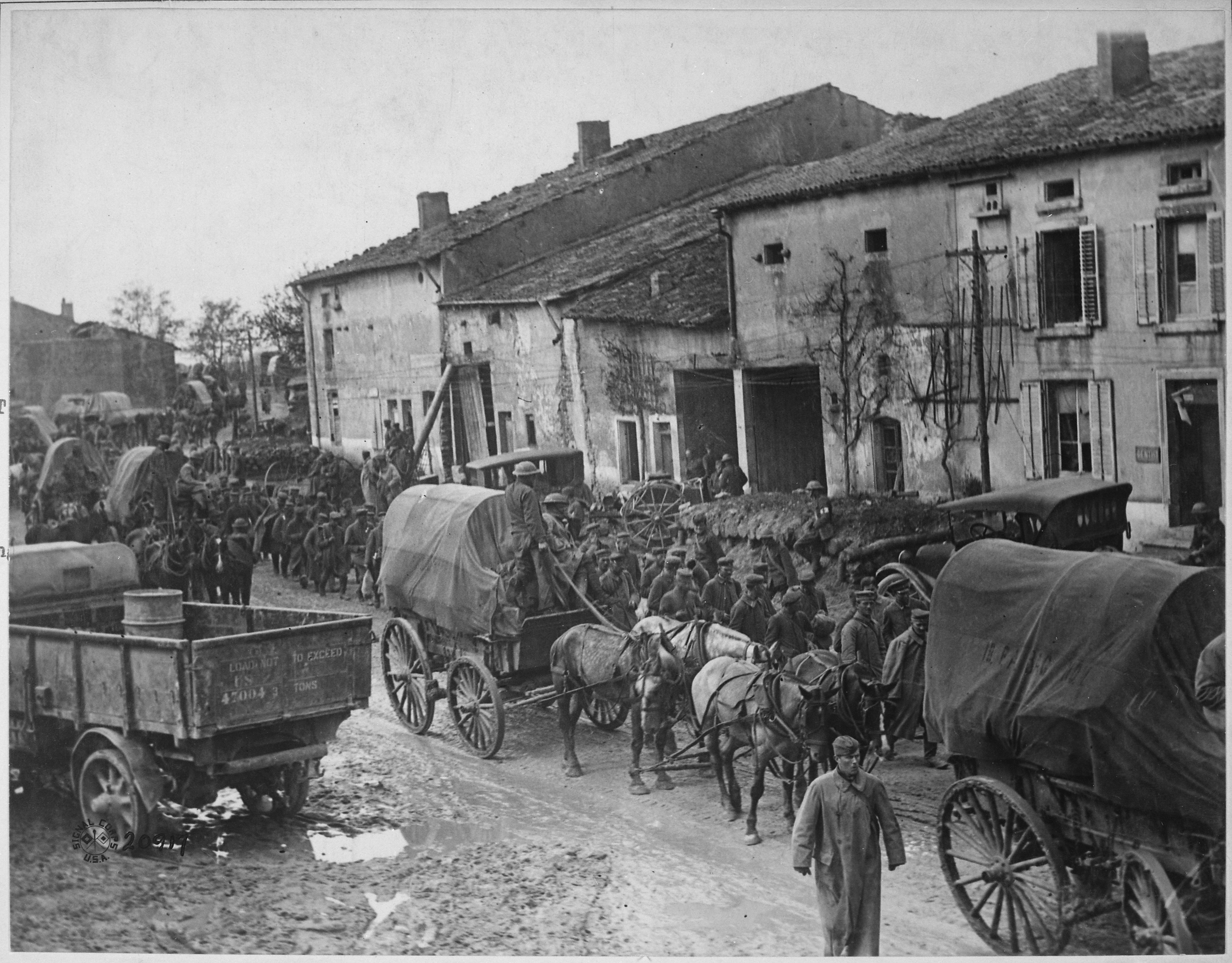
Columns of German prisoners taken by the Americans in the first day of the assault on the St. Mihiel salient, marching in the rain toward the prison pens prepared for them at Ansauville, France.

The Saint-Mihiel offensive began on 12 September with a threefold assault on the salient. The main attack was made against the south face by two American corps. On the right was the I Corps (from right to left the 82nd, 90th, 5th, and 2nd Divisions in line with the 78th in reserve) covering a front from Pont-à-Mousson on the Moselle west toward Limey; on the left, the IV Corps (from right to left the 89th, 42d, and 1st Divisions in line with the 3rd in reserve) extending along a front from Limey west toward Marvoisin. A secondary thrust was carried out against the west face along the heights of the Meuse, from Mouilly north to Haudimont, by the V Corps (from right to left the 26th Division, the French 15th Colonial Division, and the 8th Brigade, 4th Division in line with the rest of the 4th in reserve). A holding attack against the apex, to keep the enemy in the salient, was made by the French II Colonial Corps (from right to left the French 39th Colonial Division, the French 26th Division, and the French 2nd Cavalry Division in line). In First Army reserve were the American 35th, 80th, and 91st Divisions.

The American V Corps location was at the northwestern vertices, the II French Colonial Corps at the southern apex, and the American IV and I Corps at the southeastern vertices of the salient. Furthermore, General Pershing's intent was obvious; to envelop the salient by using the main enveloping thrusts of the attack against the weak vertices. The remaining forces would then advance on a broad front toward Metz. This pincer action, by the IV and V Corps, was to drive the attack into the salient and to link the friendly forces at the French village of Vigneulles, while the II French Colonial Corps kept the remaining Germans tied down. The French II Colonial Corps were successful in the attack on the apex and entered Saint-Mihiel on 15 September 1918, taking 4000 prisoners. They then pushed into the plain of Woëvre up to Haumont-Woël-Doncourt.

The Allies mobilized 1,481 aircraft to provide air superiority and close air support over the front. About 40% were American-flown in American units, the remainder were British, French, and Italian. Nine bomber squadrons of the British RAF, although provided for the battle, were not under Pershing's operational control.

Defending the salient was German "Army Detachment C", consisting of eight divisions and a brigade in the line and about two divisions in reserve. Now desperately short of manpower, they had begun a step-by-step withdrawal from the salient only the day before the offensive began.

Pershing's plan had tanks supporting the advancing infantry, with two tank companies interspersed into a depth of at least three lines, and a third tank company in reserve. The result of the detailed planning was an almost unopposed assault into the salient. The American I Corps reached its first day's objective before noon, and the second day's objective by late afternoon of the second. The attack went so well on 12 September that Pershing ordered a speedup in the offensive. By the morning of 13 September, the 1st Division, advancing from the east, joined up with the 26th Division, moving in from the west, and before evening all objectives in the salient had been captured. At this point, Pershing halted further advances so that American units could be withdrawn for the coming Meuse-Argonne Offensive.

=== Order of Battle, First Army, 12 September 1918 ===
Section source: OAFH

First United States Army – Gen. John J Pershing

- I Corps: Maj Gen Hunter Liggett
  - Headquarters Observation Group
    - 2nd Balloon Company
    - 5th Balloon Company
  - 82nd Division – Maj Gen William P. Burnham
    - 50th Aero Squadron (split duty)
    - 42nd Balloon Company (split duty)
  - 90th Division – Maj Gen Henry Tureman Allen
    - 50th Aero Squadron (split duty)
    - 42nd Balloon Company (split duty)
  - 5th Division – Maj Gen John E. McMahon
    - 12th Aero Squadron
    - 1st Balloon Company
  - 2nd Division – Maj Gen John A. Lejeune
    - 1st Aero Squadron
    - 1st Balloon Company
  - 78th Division (Corps Reserve) – Maj Gen James H McRae
- IV Corps – Maj Gen Joseph T. Dickman
  - Headquarters Observation Group
    - 69th Balloon Company
  - 89th Division – Maj Gen William M. Wright
    - 135th Aero Squadron
    - 43rd Balloon Company
  - 42nd Division – Maj Gen Charles T. Menoher
    - 90th Aero Squadron
    - 3rd Balloon Company
  - 1st Division – Maj Gen Charles Pelot Summerall
    - 8th Aero Squadron
    - 9th Balloon Company
  - 3rd Division (Corps Reserve) – Maj Gen Beaumont B. Buck
- V Corps – Maj Gen George H. Cameron
  - Headquarters Observation Group
    - 99th Aero Squadron
    - 7th Balloon Company
  - 26th Division – Maj Gen Clarence Ransom Edwards
    - 88th Aero Squadron
    - 104th Aero Squadron
    - 6th Balloon Company
  - 15th Colonial Division (French)
    - 8th Balloon Company
  - 4th Division – Maj Gen John L. Hines
    - 8th Brigade
    - 4th Field Artillery Brigade
    - remainder of Division in reserve
    - 12th Balloon Company
- US Army Reserve
  - 35th Division – Maj Gen Peter E. Traub
  - 80th Division – Maj Gen Adelbert Cronkhite
  - 91st Division – Maj Gen William H. Johnston
  - 2d Pursuit Group under First U.S. Army command
    - 13th Aero Squadron

=== Order of Battle, French Army, 12 September 1918 ===
- 2e corps d'armée colonial (2e CAC) - Gen Ernest Joseph Blondlat
  - 2e division de cavalerie à pied (2e DCP) - Gen Hennocque
  - 26e division d'infanterie - Gen de Belenet
  - 39e division d'infanterie - Gen Pougin
- Division Aérienne (France) – Gen Duval
  - 1st Air Brigade
  - 2nd Air Brigade

== Aftermath ==
One reason for the American forces' success at St. Mihiel was General Pershing's thoroughly detailed operations order. Pershing's operation included detailed plans for penetrating the Germans' trenches, using a combined arms approach to warfare. Another reason was the audacity of the small unit commanders on the battlefield. Unlike other officers who commanded their soldiers from the rear, Colonel George S. Patton and Brigadier General Douglas MacArthur and their subordinates would lead their men from the front lines. They believed that a commander's personal control of the situation would help ease the chaos of the battlefield.

American Captain Harry Truman, who commanded Battery D of the 129th Field Artillery Regiment during the battle, later became President of the United States.

== In popular culture ==
The Battle of Saint-Mihiel is depicted in the climax of the 1927 film Wings.

The battle is the subject of the song “The Yankee Division March” by the German death metal band Kanonenfieber.

The Battle of Saint-Mihiel is depicted as a playable map in the Roblox WW1 FPS Shooter "Entrenched".

== See also ==
- St. Mihiel American Cemetery and Memorial

== General and cited references ==
=== Books ===
- Bonk, David (2011). St. Mihiel 1918; The American Expeditionary Forces' trial by fire. Osprey Campaign Series #238. Osprey Publishing. ISBN 978-1-84908-391-1.
- Clodfelter, M. (2017). Warfare and Armed Conflicts: A Statistical Encyclopedia of Casualty and Other Figures, 1492-2015 (4th ed.). Jefferson, North Carolina: McFarland. ISBN 978-0-7864-7470-7.
- Hofmann, Donn Albert Starry (2012). Camp Colt to Desert Storm. The University Press of Kentucky. ISBN 978-0813128788.
- Yockelson, Mitchell (2016). Forty-Seven Days: How Pershing's Warriors Came of Age to Defeat at the German Army in World War I. New York: NAL, Caliber. ISBN 978-0-451-46695-2.

=== Websites ===
- Hanlon, Michael (1998). "St. Mihiel Offensive". Archived from the original on 8 April 2008.
- "St. Mihiel". Spartacus Educational. Archived from the original on 4 May 2008.
- Richard, J. (2007). "Battle of St. Mihiel". History of War. Archived from the original on 15 April 2008.
- "Robert Howard Gamble (1893–1918) 2nd Lieut. 11th Infantry U.S. 5th Division". Archived from the original on 16 May 2011.
