= Thomas Allen LeVesque =

American conspiracy theorist (1948–2018)

- Born: December 22, 1948; Lexington, Kentucky
- Died: December 21, 2018 (aged 69); Mariposa, California
- Other names: Jason Bishop III, Tal LeVesque
- Known for: Dulce Base conspiracy theories
- Spouse: Mary Jane Martin (m. July 8, 1973)
- Parents: Thomas Lewis LeVesque (1925–2003) (father); Mary Louise Gimball (1927–2000) (mother)

Thomas Allen LeVesque (1948–2018) was an American conspiracy theorist who promoted legends of the Hollow Earth, The Shaver Mystery, and Dulce Base. According to the author Adam Gorightly, in the final years of his life LeVesque confessed to fabricating his Dulce Base tales as a form of creative writing.

== Early life ==
Thomas Allen LeVesque was born to Thomas Lewis LeVesque and Mary Louise Gimball in Lexington, Kentucky. His father had served as a radio engineer on the USS Baldwin; he went on to a career in electrical engineering in the communication industry. On April 18, 1951, at the age of 2, LeVesque was a passenger aboard the USNS George W. Goethals. In 1965, Thomas Allen LeVesque, age 16, was arrested in Long Beach, California along with three other teens; the four were charged with placing explosives in a public building. On July 8, 1973, LeVesque wed Mary Jane Martin in Los Angeles, California.

== Promotion of conspiracy theories ==
LeVesque promoted multiple conspiracy theories about subterranean civilizations. Author Aaron Gulyas notes that LeVesque links the 19th-century Hollow Earth theories to late 20th-century conspiracy theories about UFOs and alien abductions.

=== Hollow Earth ===
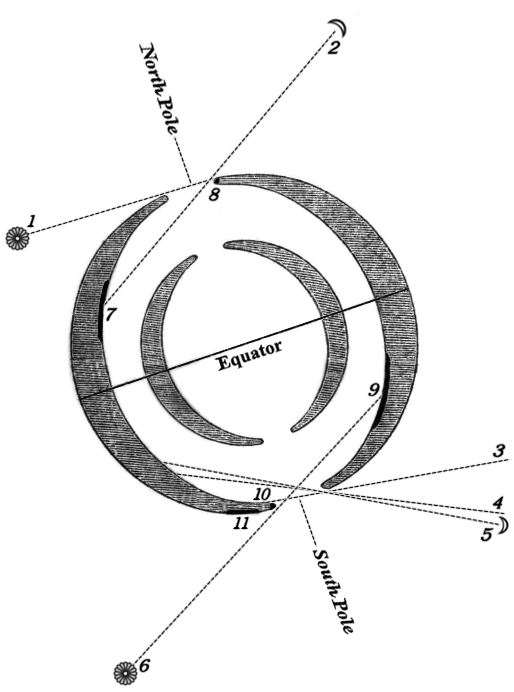
A cross-sectional drawing of a Hollow Earth from a book on Symmes's conspiracy theory.

In 1818, John Cleves Symmes, Jr. suggested that the Earth consisted of a hollow shell about 1,300 km (810 mi) thick, with openings about 2,300 km (1,400 mi) across at both poles with 4 inner shells each open at the poles. Symmes became the most famous of the early Hollow Earth proponents, and Hamilton, Ohio even has a monument to him and his ideas. He proposed making an expedition to the North Pole hole.

The Hollow Hassle was a subscription newsletter about Hollow Earth conspiracy theories that was maintained by Mary Jane Martin from the 1960s to the 1980s; LeVesque was described as the "driving force" behind the newsletter. LeVesque argued Bible verses revealed that the Earth is hollow.

=== The Shaver Mystery ===
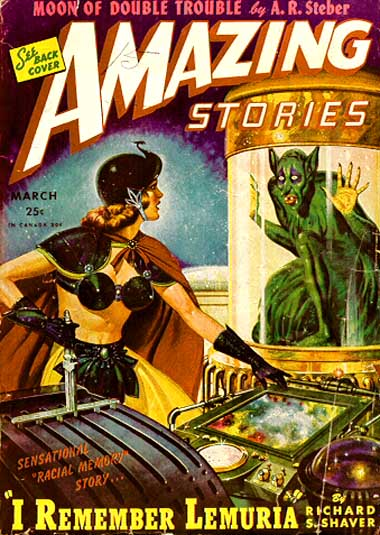
Shaver's first published work, the novella "I Remember Lemuria", was the cover story in the March 1945 Amazing Stories

Richard Sharpe Shaver (1907–1975) was an American writer who achieved notoriety in the years following World War II as the author of controversial stories that were printed in science fiction magazines (primarily Amazing Stories). In Shaver's story, he claimed that he had had personal experience of a sinister ancient civilization that harbored fantastic technology in caverns under the earth. The controversy stemmed from the claim by Shaver, and his editor and publisher Ray Palmer, that Shaver's writings, while presented in the guise of fiction, were fundamentally true. Shaver's stories were promoted by Ray Palmer as "The Shaver Mystery".

In 1970, LeVesque and Mary Jane Martin traveled to visit Richard Shaver and interviewed him about his claims. LeVesque argued that Schaver was a "normal guy who had data downloaded into his brain".

=== Dulce Base conspiracy theories ===
Starting in 1979, conspiracy theorist Paul Bennewitz became convinced he was intercepting electronic communications from alien spacecraft and installations outside of Albuquerque. By the 1980s he believed he had discovered a secret underground base near Dulce populated by grey aliens and humans. By 1983, Bennewitz's claims appeared in the popular press.

The story spread rapidly within the UFO community and by 1987, conspiracy author John Lear claimed he had independent confirmations of the base's existence.

In 1987, he visited Dulce along with Bill Hamilton. In 1989, LeVesque authored "The Dulce Base" under the pen name Jason Bishop III (LeVesque is French for "The Bishop"). Wrote LeVesque:

"Centuries ago, Surface People (some say the Illuminati) entered into a pact with an "Alien Nation" (hidden within the Earth). The U.S. Government, in 1933, agreed to trade Animals and Humans in exchange for High Tech Knowledge, and allow them to use (undisturbed) UNDERGROUND BASES, in the Western USA. A Special Group was formed to deal with the Alien Beings. In the 1940's, 'Alien Life Forms (ALF)' began shifting their focus of operations, from Central and South America, to the USA."

LeVesque claimed to relay stories from an informant supposedly named "Thomas Edwin 'TEC' Castello" who allegedly worked as a security guard at the base. LeVesque was named in the acknowledgements section of conspiracy theorist Bill Cooper's 1991 book Behold a Pale Horse.

== Confession of fabrication and death ==
LeVesque died on December 21, 2018 in Mariposa, California. Writer Adam Gorightly documented his interactions with LeVesque in his 2021 book Saucers, Spooks and Kooks; according to the book, LeVesque confessed that Castello never existed but instead was an example of "creative writing".
