= Forty-Seven Days =

Book by Mitchell Yockelson

Forty-Seven Days: How Pershing's Warriors Came of Age to Defeat the German Army in World War I
- First edition
- Author: Mitchell Yockelson
- Subject: Meuse-Argonne Offensive
- Genre: History
- Publisher: NAL Caliber/New American Library
- Publication date: 2016
- Pages: ix, 390 pages, 16 unnumbered pages of plates
- ISBN: 978-0-451-46695-2
- OCLC: 911068453

Forty-Seven Days: How Pershing's Warriors Came of Age to Defeat the German Army in World War I is a book by Mitchell Yockelson and published by NAL Caliber/New American Library about the Battles of the Meuse–Argonne offensive.

== Critical response ==
The Washington Independent Review of Books described it as a "must read" and a general introduction to the United States' involvement in World War I.

Kirkus Reviews described it as "accessible, elucidating study by a knowledgeable expert."
