= Riverton Lock =

Entrance to Colbert Shoals Canal

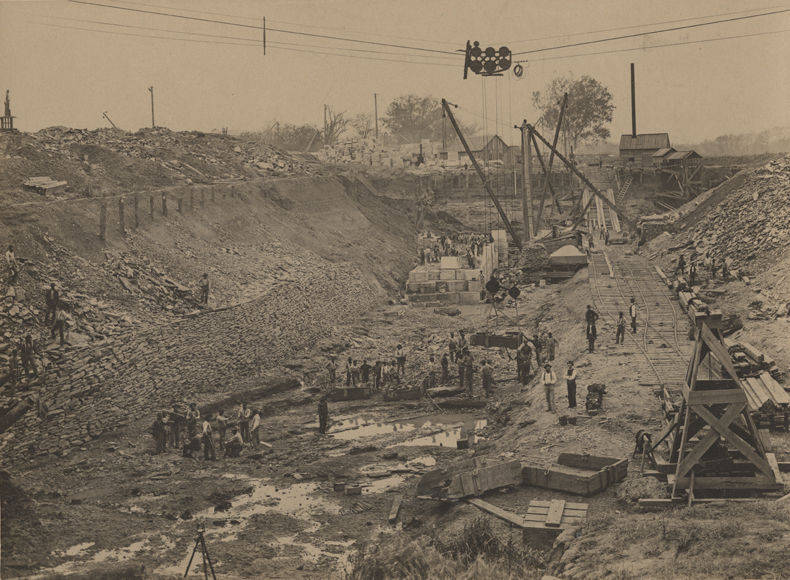
- Under construction, November 8, 1895

- Location within Alabama
- Alternative names: Colbert Shoals Lock

General information
- Type: Lock
- Coordinates: 34.89719°N 88.06528°W
- Opened: November 11, 1911
- Demolished: February 8, 1938

Height
- Height: 350 ft (110 m)

Dimensions
- Other dimensions: 80 feet wide

Design and construction
- Engineer: George Washington Goethals

Riverton Lock, also known as the Colbert Shoals Lock, was the entrance to Colbert Shoals Canal, a low water alternative route around Colbert and Bee Tree Shoals on the Tennessee River.

== History ==
The first major upstream landing on the Tennessee River after leaving Paducah, Kentucky, was Riverton, a former town site in Colbert County, Alabama. Riverton was located on the east side of the junction of the Tennessee River and Bear Creek, across Bear Creek from Eastport. Colbert and Bee Tree Shoals were immediately up river from Riverton and prevented major river traffic between Riverton and Florence, Alabama, for six months of the dry season.

In the late 1890s Muscle Shoals Canal was nearing completion; this traversed the other major shoals above Florence, Alabama, and Chattanooga, Tennessee. In 1891, George Washington Goethals, an engineer and US Army officer, was promoted to captain and was assigned the oversight of completing Muscle Shoals Canal. Goethals developed a design for a single high lift lock to be located at the downstream end of Colbert Shoals canal at Riverton. Goethals was successful in convincing the Army Corps of Engineers that the high lift lock was feasible and was eventually given the approval for its construction.

Riverton Lock began operation on November 11, 1911, and at its completion was the highest lift lock in the world. Completed dimensions are 80 feet (24 m) wide and 350 feet (110 m) inside the miter sills with a lift of 26 feet (7.9 m).

After the success Goethals had with the design and construction of Riverton Lock, he was transferred to Panama and given the responsibility of designing and constructing the Panama Canal. Many of the principles developed at Riverton Lock were applied to the Panama Locks. Goethals later became the first Governor of the Panama Canal Zone.

Riverton Lock was flooded when Pickwick Landing Dam was completed on February 8, 1938.
