= The Rhinemann Exchange =

1974 novel by Robert Ludlum

- The Rhinemann Exchange first edition cover.
- Author: Robert Ludlum
- Cover artist: Bob Giusti
- Language: English
- Genre: Spy novel
- Publisher: Dial Press
- Publication date: 1974
- Publication place: United States
- Media type: Print (Hardback & Paperback)
- Pages: 402 pp (first edition)
- ISBN: 0-8037-7532-6
- OCLC: 922791
- Dewey Decimal: 813/.5/4
- LC Class: PZ4.L9455 Rh PS3562.U26

The Rhinemann Exchange is a novel of suspense by Robert Ludlum, set in the middle of the Second World War.

== Plot summary ==
On the eve of the Second World War, David Spaulding, a radio voice actor, is recruited by Colonel Ed Pace to run a secret network in Lisbon.

The plot advances to 1943. Both the Allies and the Axis find themselves facing key shortages that impede their ability to win the war. The Allies lack gyroscopes capable of operating at high altitudes; thus they are losing an unacceptably high number of bombers. If they do not procure gyroscopes soon, Operation Overlord will need to be postponed. Meanwhile, the Germans find themselves without high quality diamonds, which are necessary for the V-weapons development program at Peenemünde.

Ironically, each side has what the other needs: the Allies control access to high quality diamonds from the Belgian Congo; the Germans have a design for a gyroscope able to operate at high altitudes. The German intelligence agency, the Nachrichtendienst, discovers that the Allies are in need of gyroscopes, and proposes an exchange, to take place in neutral territory: Buenos Aires, Argentina.

David Spaulding has, in the meantime, become an invaluable spy for the Allies. His Lisbon network ferries agents and defectors back and forth from German-occupied territory. He is selected, however, to oversee the receipt of the gyroscopes – critically, he does not know that diamonds are being exchanged for the gyroscopes.

The Germans select the exiled industrialist Erich Rhinemann to supervise the exchange at their end. They choose him because, he is although Jewish, he is committed to German victory and believes that he will be welcomed back after a German victory. Rhinemann is immensely influential and powerful in Buenos Aires.

Although puzzled at his assignment away from Lisbon, Spaulding accepts his new assignment. However, there are several attempts made on his life: one occurring at an airfield in the Azores, another in New York City. While he is in New York, awaiting details on his assignment, he encounters an old flame, Leslie Jenner Hawkwood who, having drawn him away from his apartment, seemingly vanishes into thin air. Spaulding's mentor, Ed Pace, is meanwhile murdered.

Upon arrival in Buenos Aires, Spaulding meets and falls in love with Jean Cameron, a woman employed by the embassy. Attacks on him continue, and he suspects he is being trailed by the Gestapo. He meets with Rhinemann to acquire the gyroscopes, but tries to draw out his mysterious assailants – Rhinemann and the other Germans are adamant that the Gestapo is not active in Buenos Aires.

To his profound shock, Spaulding discovers that the people trying to stop him work for the Haganah, a Jewish paramilitary organization set on stopping the exchange. When he captures Asher Feld, the Haganah leader, Feld informs him that he is a party to an exchange of diamonds for gyroscopes. From then on, Spaulding decides that the exchange must be stopped. He pretends to carry out his end, all the while facilitating a Haganah attack on Rhinemann's estate. Spaulding succeeds in killing Rhinemann (who had planned to kill him after the exchange) and Rhinemann's Nazi controller. Having acquired incriminating evidence about the exchange, Spaulding blackmails the Americans who had arranged it and arranges to retire with his beloved Jean.

== Characters ==
- David Spaulding – a deadly and clever agent for American intelligence
- Erich Rhinemann – the devious German industrialist dedicated to carrying out the exchange
- Jean Cameron – a resourceful woman working for the American embassy in Buenos Aires
- Eugene Lyons – a haunted scientist working with Spaulding to check the gyroscope design. Lyons, having struggled with alcoholism, has caused severe damage to his throat and is barely able to speak. He forms a surprisingly tight bond with Spaulding and becomes a valuable ally.
- Brigadier Alan Swanson – the American general masterminding the exchange. Although a novice at intelligence, Swanson is nonetheless ruthless and commands, at the outset, that Rhinemann must be killed.
- Franz Altmüller – the vicious Nazi counterpart to Swanson.
- Walter Kendall – a clever but rather ill-kept accountant who works with Swanson to arrange the deal. As indicated in the novel, Kendall does not bathe frequently.
- Ed Pace – the man who recruited Spaulding to the intelligence services
- Leslie Jenner Hawkwood – an old flame of Spaulding, who - having married into a Jewish family - is aware of the full extent of the Nazi genocide and who has joined the Haganah.

== Notes ==
- The Rhinemann Exchange features the Nachrichtendienst, a mysterious World War 2-era German intelligence agency. This organization is also featured in The Holcroft Covenant.
- Although the plot is fiction, it may have been inspired by a similar Faustian bargain which was contemplated by the British and the Germans in World War I whereby British rubber would have been traded for German optical instruments via a series of Swiss intermediaries. In the end this deal did not go ahead.
- In addition to dismissing as unsubstantiated allegations that De Beers continued to supply the Germans during World War II, Edward Jay Epstein confirms that industrial diamond supply was a major headache for the Nazi war machine – but also to a lesser degree for the US.

== Television adaptation ==
In 1977 the book was adapted as a five-hour, three-part mini-series, directed by Burt Kennedy, and starring Stephen Collins (as David Spaulding), Lauren Hutton (as Leslie Hawkewood), Vince Edwards (as General Swanson), José Ferrer (as Erich Rhinemann), Larry Hagman (as Colonel Pace), John Huston (as Ambassador Granville), Roddy McDowall (as Bob Ballard), René Auberjonois (as Dr Lyons), Werner Klemperer (as Franz Altmuller), Claude Akins (as Walter Kendall), and Jeremy Kemp (as Geoffrey Moore).

== Publication history ==
- 1974, US, Dial Press ISBN 0-8037-7532-6, Pub date 1974, Hardback
- 1975, US, Dell Publishing ISBN 0-440-15079-5, Pub date July 15, 1975, Paperback
- 1975, UK, Grafton ISBN 0-246-10848-7 Pub date March 17, 1975, Hardback
- 1992, UK, HarperCollins ISBN 0-586-04202-4, Pub date May 21, 1992, Paperback

== Sources ==
- The Secret War Report of the OSS by Edward Jay Epstein
