= First World War glass–rubber exchange =

British-German proposed materials exhange

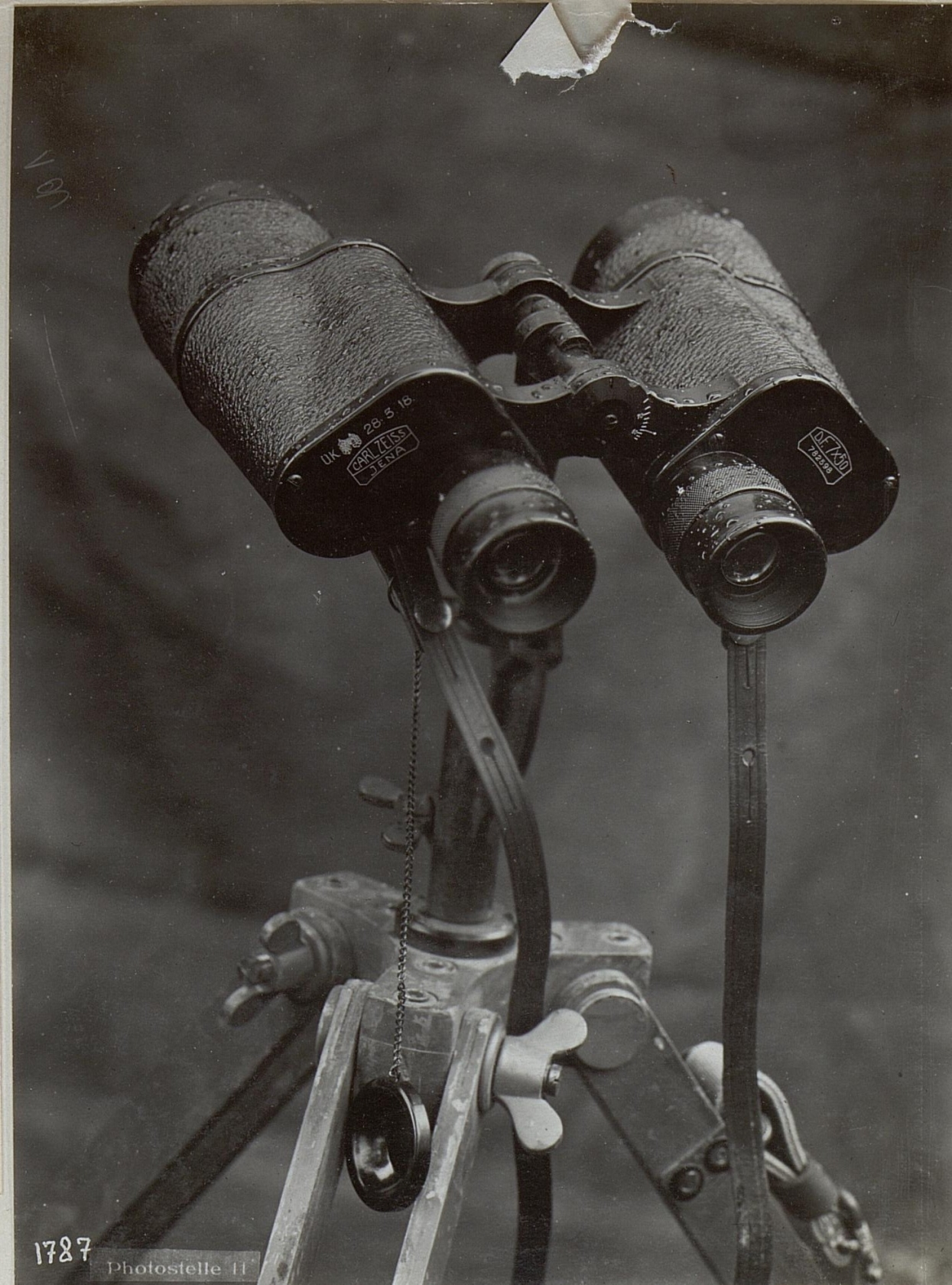
First World War era Zeiss binoculars

An exchange of rubber for optical glass was proposed by Britain and Germany during the First World War. Optical glass was vital to the warfare of this era for binoculars and gunsights and rubber was needed for tyres and communications cables. Britain had sourced the majority of its pre-war optical glass from the German company of Carl Zeiss AG and by early 1915 was suffering from a shortage. Germany, with its sea trade blockaded by allied forces, was unable to import natural rubber and found it could not create enough high-quality synthetic rubber to replace it. The British Ministry of Munitions proposed an exchange of British-sourced rubber for German optical instruments through intermediaries in Switzerland. Terms were agreed for tens of thousands of pairs of binoculars to be exchanged but sources differ on whether any actual trade took place. By early 1916, British investment and technological improvements had increased production of optical glass such that any need for an exchange was removed. By the late war German production of optical glass was itself failing to keep up with high demand from the army.

== Background ==
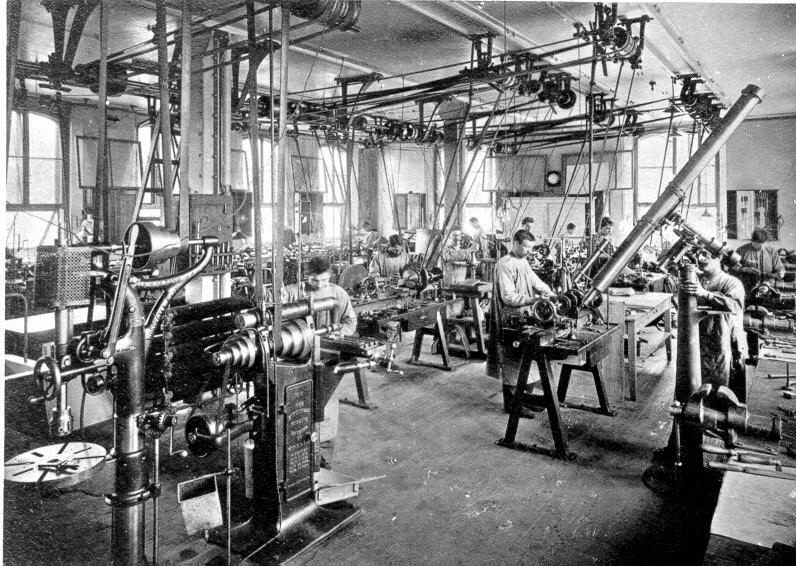
Pre-war Zeiss optical workshop

The First World War was the first major conflict where more gun laying was made by optical equipment such as binoculars and rangefinders than by unaided eye. These tools were essential for the accurate fire control of artillery pieces which were now shooting at ranges of up to 40,000–60,000 yards (37–55 km). With the advent of widescale trench warfare binoculars became vital tools for infantry officers looking to discern the position of enemy snipers and machine guns. Optical lenses were also required for aerial cameras, periscopes and telescopic rifle sights. Pre-war Germany had been a major supplier of optical equipment to the world, with production centred on the city of Jena. Carl Zeiss AG was a particularly prominent company in this field. In 1913 60% of British optical glass was manufactured in Jena and 30% by Parra Mantois in France. After the start of the war France struggled to meet its own requirements and very little was made available for export to Britain.

The rapid expansion of the British Army required many times more optical instruments than before the war. British company Messrs Chance Brothers of Birmingham had previously supplied just 10% of pre-war demand but assured the War Office that they would be able to meet all demand for the war. Some progress was made in increasing manufacture of telescopic sights, which were of a smaller size and easier to manufacture, but British firms lacked the machinery and expertise required to make larger lenses in quantity. Glasgow firm Barr & Stroud was also able to expand production but by spring 1915 it became clear that domestic production was falling far short of the quantities required.

The British government sought to import optical instruments from the United States but these were generally small in quantity; an offer of binoculars from Bausch & Lomb was rejected due to an unsatisfactory design. An appeal was made to the British public to donate binoculars to the army - some 2,000 instruments were received (including four each from the king and queen) but this was far short of what was needed. By November 1915 the government had requisitioned all unsold stock held in shops across the country. As well as glass the allies were short of other products that they had previously relied upon Germany to supply and had little to no domestic manufacturing capability; this included engine starters, uniform dyes and laboratory apparatus.

Germany, under allied naval blockade, was also short of key military supplies. Lacking a supply of natural rubber it was unable to produce the quantities of communications cables, tyres and fan belts required for its operations. Germany had attempted to manufacture synthetic rubber but at this early stage quantities produced were low and the product was of poor quality. Britain and France, by contrast, had access to large quantities of natural rubber from their African and Asian colonies. By early 1915 the German army was so desperate for tyres that it was considering running its supply trucks on steel tyres, which severely damaged road surfaces.

== Negotiations ==
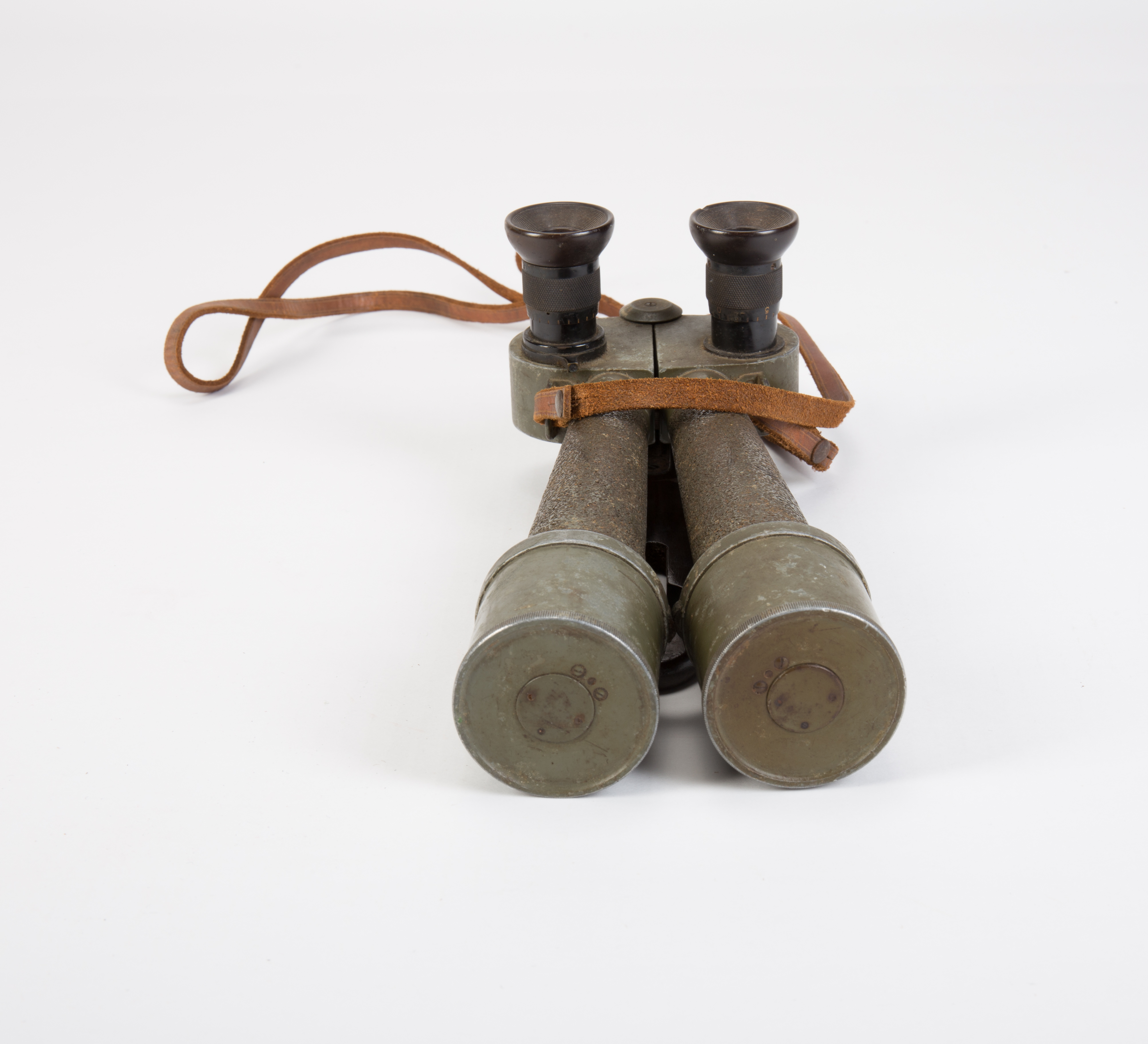
Zeiss trench periscope used by Major General William Sinclair-Burgess of the First Australian Imperial Force

An agent from the British Ministry of Munitions was sent to neutral Switzerland to carry out secret negotiations with the Germans, through Swiss intermediaries, for the exchange of optical instruments for natural rubber. It was agreed with the German War Office that they would supply 8–10,000 each of two types of binoculars - one specification for infantry officers and one for artillery officers. The Germans responded that they could supply a greater quantity direct from their current stockpiles and offered 10–15,000 of each type to be delivered within six weeks of a contract being signed. They also stated that 10–12,000 binoculars of a lower grade, suitable for use by non-commissioned officers, could be made available immediately and thereafter supplied at a rate of 5,000 pairs per month. Additionally 5–10,000 gun sights per month and as many range finders as desired could be produced. To meet the increased demand the Germans were willing to release workers who had been conscripted into the armed forces back to Zeiss. It was suggested that, in lieu of samples being provided for inspection, that the British examine the quality of equipment captured from German forces in the field. In exchange the British were to ship natural rubber from Africa and South-East Asia to Switzerland which would then be transported across the German border.

There are differing opinions on whether the physical exchange ever occurred. Adam Hochschild claims in his 2011 work To End All Wars: A Story of Loyalty and Rebellion, 1914–1918 that 32,000 pairs of binoculars were exchanged in the first month of the agreement (August 1915) but that no records survived of any subsequent shipments or the supply of rubber. Alan Simmonds states in his 2013 work Britain and World War One that 30,000 pairs of binoculars were supplied by the end of 1915; historian Guy Hartcup came to the same conclusion after analysis of British archive material. However, John L. Heilbron, in his 2003 work Ernest Rutherford: And the Explosion of Atoms, and Stewart Wills writing in the Optics & Photonics journal in 2016, claim that no exchange was made.

== Aftermath ==
Britain made efforts to rapidly increase its outputs of optical glass, bringing all production under the control of the Optical Munitions and Glassware Department of the Ministry of Munitions (working with the Royal Society's Advisory Council for Scientific and Industrial Research) in July 1915. An offer was made to Chance Brothers of government funding and guaranteed future orders which allowed them to expand their factory and purchase new machinery to increase production to 70,000 lb (32,000 kg) of glass per year by November 1916 and to 92,000 lb (42,000 kg) by 1918. There remained a difficulty in supplying enough potash to meet the manufacturing demand. The British made several technological breakthroughs, making improvements to existing German patents, and by 1916 had almost made good on their supply deficit. Self-sufficiency was never quite achieved but by the war's end a top-quality and high-volume optical industry had essentially been created from scratch. Chance, along with many other British companies, suffered a huge decline in trade at the end of the war but survived until the 1980s.

In Germany Zeiss later found itself struggling to keep up with increased demand for its products from the army. Despite expansion programmes in 1914 and 1915 increasing the workforce from 5,200 to 9,800 persons, the government was forced to intervene to allow other companies into the market. By the late war shortages of glass instruments were apparent.

The 1974 novel The Rhinemann Exchange explores a similar theme, but is set in the Second World War with an exchange of industrial diamonds for gyroscopes between the United States and Germany.
