= George Washington Goethals =

United States Army general (1858–1928)

- Goethals c. 1919

1st Governor of Panama Canal Zone
- In office 1914–1917
- Succeeded by: Chester Harding

State Engineer of New Jersey
- In office 1917–1917

Acting Quartermaster General of the United States Army
- In office 1917–1919

President of George W. Goethals & Co.
- In office 1919–1923

Personal details
- Born: June 29, 1858 Brooklyn, New York, U.S.
- Died: January 21, 1928 (aged 69) Manhattan, New York City, U.S.
- Resting place: West Point Cemetery
- Spouse: Effie Rodman (m. 1884)
- Children: 2
- Education: College of the City of New York; United States Military Academy
- Awards: Public Welfare Medal (1914); Cullum Geographical Medal (1917); John Fritz Medal (1919); Distinguished Service Medal
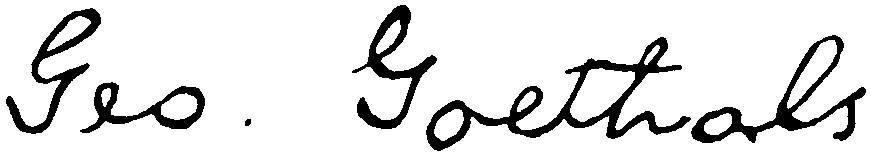
- Signature

Military service
- Rank: Major General

George Washington Goethals (/ˈɡoʊθəlz/ GOH-thəlz June 29, 1858 – January 21, 1928) was an American military officer and civil engineer, best known for his administration and supervision of the construction and the opening of the Panama Canal. He was the first Governor of Panama Canal Zone from 1914 to 1917, and was also the State Engineer of New Jersey and the Acting Quartermaster General of the United States Army.

== Early life and education ==
Portrait of Goethals as a young man c. 1880

Goethals was born in Brooklyn, New York, to Flemish immigrants from Stekene, Belgium, Johannes Baptista (John Louis) Goethals, a carpenter, and wife Marie Le Barron. Aged 14, he entered the College of the City of New York. In April 1876, after three years of college, he won an appointment to the United States Military Academy (USMA) at West Point, New York and entered there in June. He graduated second in his class of 52 in June 1880, and was commissioned as a second lieutenant in the Corps of Engineers of the United States Army.

== Military career ==
Goethals remained at the military academy during the summer and fall of 1880 as an assistant instructor in practical astronomy. In 1881, he attended the Engineer School of Application at Willets Point, New York. His first field assignment came in 1882 with his appointment as engineer officer of the Department of Columbia in Vancouver, Washington. His routine duties included reconnaissance, surveys, and astronomical work, while his most consequential project was the replacement of a 120-foot bridge across the Spokane River.

From 1885 to 1889, he taught civil and military engineering at West Point. He returned to the field in 1889 to assist Colonel John W. Barlow with navigational improvements on the Cumberland River and Tennessee River.

While an instructor at West Point, Goethals agreed to tutor Charles Young, the third African-American graduate of West Point; Young had failed an engineering class but – after being tutored by Goethals – passed and graduated in 1889.

In 1891, Goethals was promoted to captain. He soon was placed in charge of the completion of the Muscle Shoals Canal along the Tennessee River near Florence, Alabama. This was his first independent command, and his responsibilities included the design and construction of the Riverton Lock at Colbert Shoals. His recommendation of a single lock with an unprecedented lift of twenty-six feet was initially opposed by his superiors in Washington, and he was forced to persuade the conservative army engineers of the merits of his design. The lock's successful construction set a world record for lock height. The success of the Riverton Lock inspired the eventual adoption of high-lift locks elsewhere, including those for the Panama Canal.

During the Spanish–American War, he was lieutenant colonel and chief of engineers of United States Volunteers. In 1903, Goethals became a member of the first Army General Staff in Washington, D.C., and served as coastal defence expert.

== Construction of the Panama Canal ==
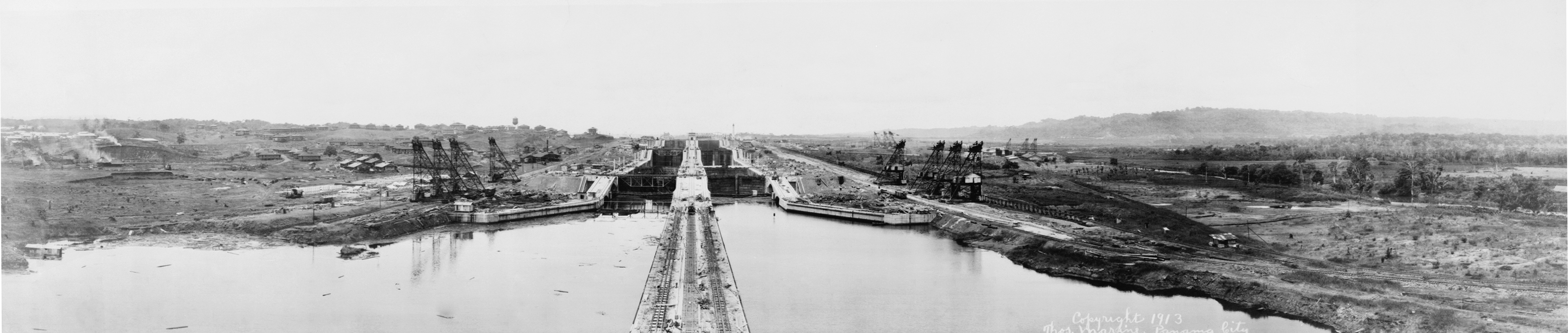
Construction of locks on the Panama Canal, 1913

Theodore Roosevelt believed that a US-controlled canal across Central America was a vital strategic interest of the country. Roosevelt encouraged the acquisition of the French Panama Canal effort. The purchase of the French-held land for $40 million was authorized by the June 28, 1902, Spooner Act. Since Panama was then part of Colombia, Roosevelt began negotiating with that country to obtain the necessary rights. In early 1903 the Hay–Herrán Treaty was signed by both nations, but the Senate of Colombia failed to ratify the treaty.

Roosevelt implied to Panamanian rebels that if they revolted, the US Navy would assist their fight for independence. Panama declared its independence on November 3, 1903, and the USS Nashville impeded Colombian interference. The victorious Panamanians gave the United States control of the Panama Canal Zone on February 23, 1904, for $10 million in accordance with the November 18, 1903 Hay–Bunau-Varilla Treaty.

=== United States takeover ===
Goethals c. 1900s

The United States took control of the French property—after the bankruptcy of the French Compagnie Universelle du Canal Interocéanique de Panama that started constructions on The Panama Canal under Ferdinand de Lesseps— on May 4, 1904. The new Panama Canal Zone Control was overseen by the Isthmian Canal Commission (ICC) during construction.

The US inherited a small workforce and an assortment of buildings, infrastructure and equipment, much of which had been neglected for fifteen years in the humid jungle environment. There were no facilities in place for a large workforce, and the infrastructure was crumbling.

Although chief engineer John Findley Wallace was pressured to resume construction, red tape from Washington stifled his efforts to obtain heavy equipment and caused friction between Wallace and the ICC. He and chief sanitary officer William C. Gorgas were frustrated by delay, and Wallace resigned in 1905. He was replaced by John Frank Stevens, who arrived on July 26, 1905. Stevens' approach was to press ahead first and obtain approval later. He improved drilling and dirt-removal equipment at the Culebra Cut for greater efficiency, revising the inadequate provisions in place for soil disposal. In November 1906 Roosevelt visited Panama to inspect the canal's progress, the first trip outside the United States by a sitting president.

=== Chief engineer of the Panama Canal ===
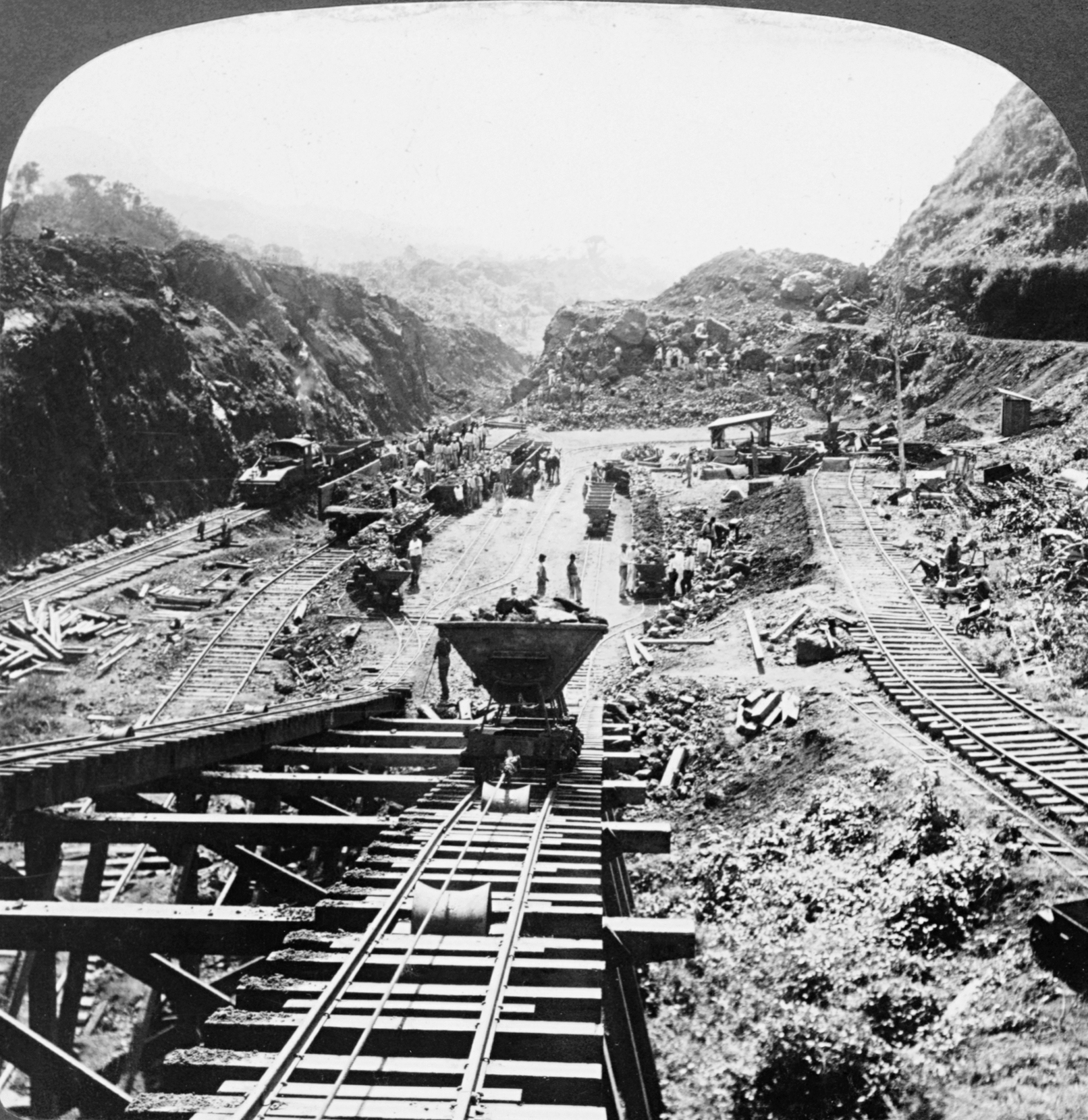
Panama Canal under construction, 1907

Whether contract employees or government workers would build the canal was controversial. Bids for the canal's construction were opened in January 1907, and Knoxville, Tennessee-based contractor William J. Oliver was the low bidder. Stevens disliked Oliver, and vehemently opposed his choice. Although Roosevelt initially favoured the use of a contractor, he eventually decided that army engineers should carry out the work. According to the book The Panama Canal: An Army's Enterprise, Goethals made such an impression on William Howard Taft, then Secretary of War, that Taft recommended him as an engineer for the Panama Canal. Stevens, frustrated by government inaction and the army involvement, resigned from his position.

In February 1907 US President Theodore Roosevelt appointed Colonel George Washington Goethals chief engineer of the Panama Canal. The building of the Canal was completed in 1914, two years ahead of the target date of June 10, 1916.

Colonel Goethals received unstinted praise from visiting engineers and from the technical press of the world. In 1913 the degree of LL.D. was conferred on him by the University of Pennsylvania, and in the spring of 1914 he was awarded medals by the National Geographic Society, the Civic Forum (New York), and the National Institute of Social Sciences. In 1914, Goethals and William Crawford Gorgas were awarded the inaugural Public Welfare Medal from the National Academy of Sciences. Also, Congress awarded Goethals their thanks and a promotion to major general.

President Wilson appointed Goethals as the first Civil Governor of the Panama Canal Zone. In Panama, his secretary from 1915 to 1917 was Sam Serling, a young man from Detroit who would become father of screenwriter Rod Serling.

== World War I ==
General Goethals resigned from the post of Governor of the Canal Zone in 1916. Soon he was made chairman of the board of inquiry in regard to the Adamson eight-hour law. His positions thereafter were: State engineer of New Jersey in 1917 and manager of the Emergency Fleet Corporation (briefly). George Washington Goethals was appointed as acting Quartermaster General of the United States Army during the most crucial period of World War I (December 19, 1917 to May 9, 1918) and was a member of the War Industries Board (1918).

=== Quartermaster General of the United States Army ===
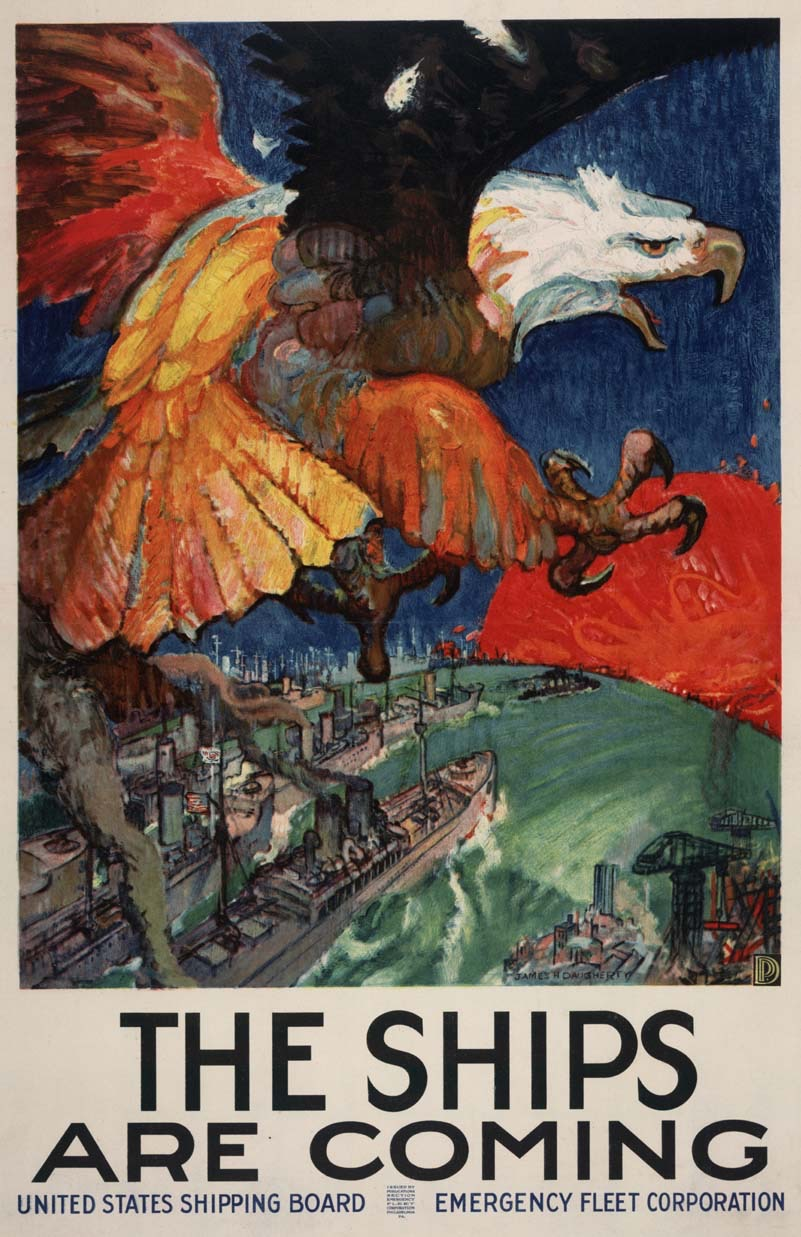
A World War I poster for the US Shipping Board, c. 1917–18

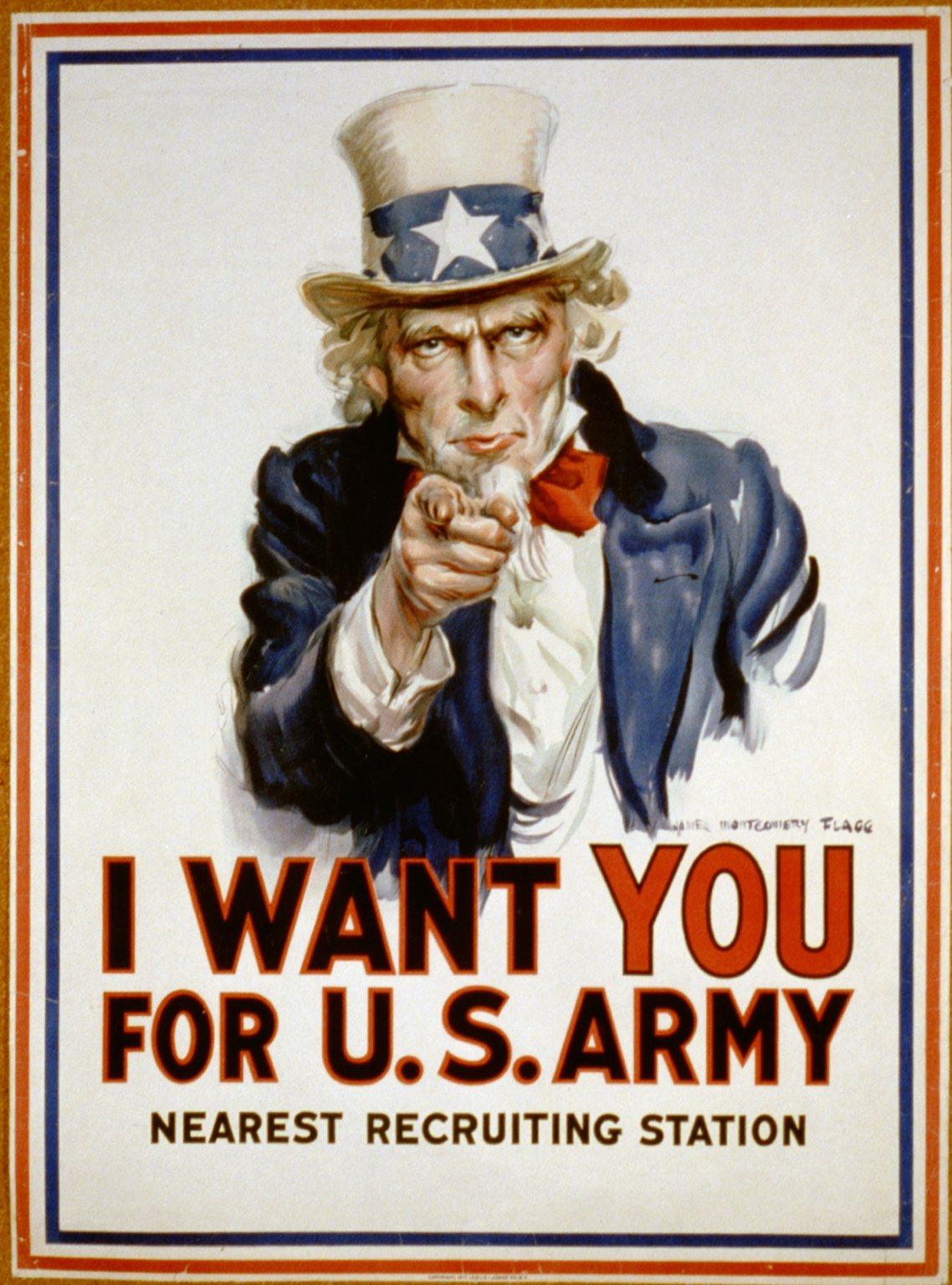
Uncle Sam pointing his finger at the viewer in order to recruit soldiers for the U.S. Army during World War I, 1917-1918

In April 1917 George W. Goethals was serving at President Woodrow Wilson's request, as General Manager and Director of the Emergency Fleet Corporation— charged with creating improvised ships, to carry the American army and its supplies to France, in the shortest possible time.

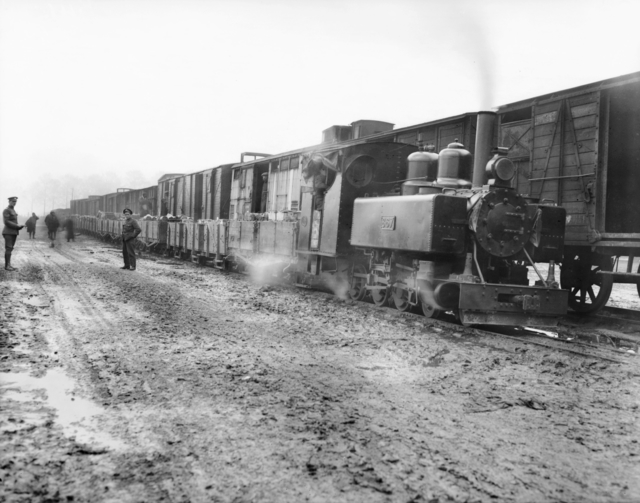
Transfer of ammunition from standard-gauge railway to trench railway during the Battle of Passchendaele

The United States as late as 1917 maintained only a small army, smaller than thirteen of the nations and empires already active in the war. After the passage of the Selective Service Act of May 1917, the U.S. drafted 4 million men into military service, the logistics demands were unprecedented. By the summer of 1918, about 2 million US soldiers had arrived in France and approximately 10,000 fresh soldiers were arriving in Europe each day.

Mainly as a result of supply blunders during the bitter winter of 1917, a Congressional investigation was under way, when General Goethals was recalled to active service, and was asked on December 19, 1917, to accept appointment as Acting Quartermaster General. Goethals did so only after Secretary of War Newton D. Baker had assured him full authority and that he would not be interfered with, nine days later he was appointed Director of the Storage & Traffic Service. Reaction to his appointment at home and overseas is illustrated by a message he is said to have received from former President Theodore Roosevelt: "I congratulate you, and thrice over I congratulate the country."

The Army's supply chain suffered from three main problems—a shortage of specialized personnel, decentralized organization and diverse uncoordinated functions. When the United States entered the war, the Quartermaster Corps had suffered a loss of personnel—most officers were sent to the front—this was the first problem demanding attention. Believing the Army's business could be best organized along civilian lines, he hired military men who could get along with industrialists and built with and around a number of highly trained executives and businessmen (among the new recruits were Hugh S. Johnson and Robert J. Thorne). Some of these men were commissioned and some were dollar-a-year-men, most of whom never collected the dollar. From General Goethals down, practically everyone was on the job from early morning to late at night, seven days a week.

Goethals reorganized the corps along functional lines and by January 26, purchasing had been taken away from outside agencies, and placed under his control. The functions of each division and branch were specifically set forth and the personnel in charge was officially designated.

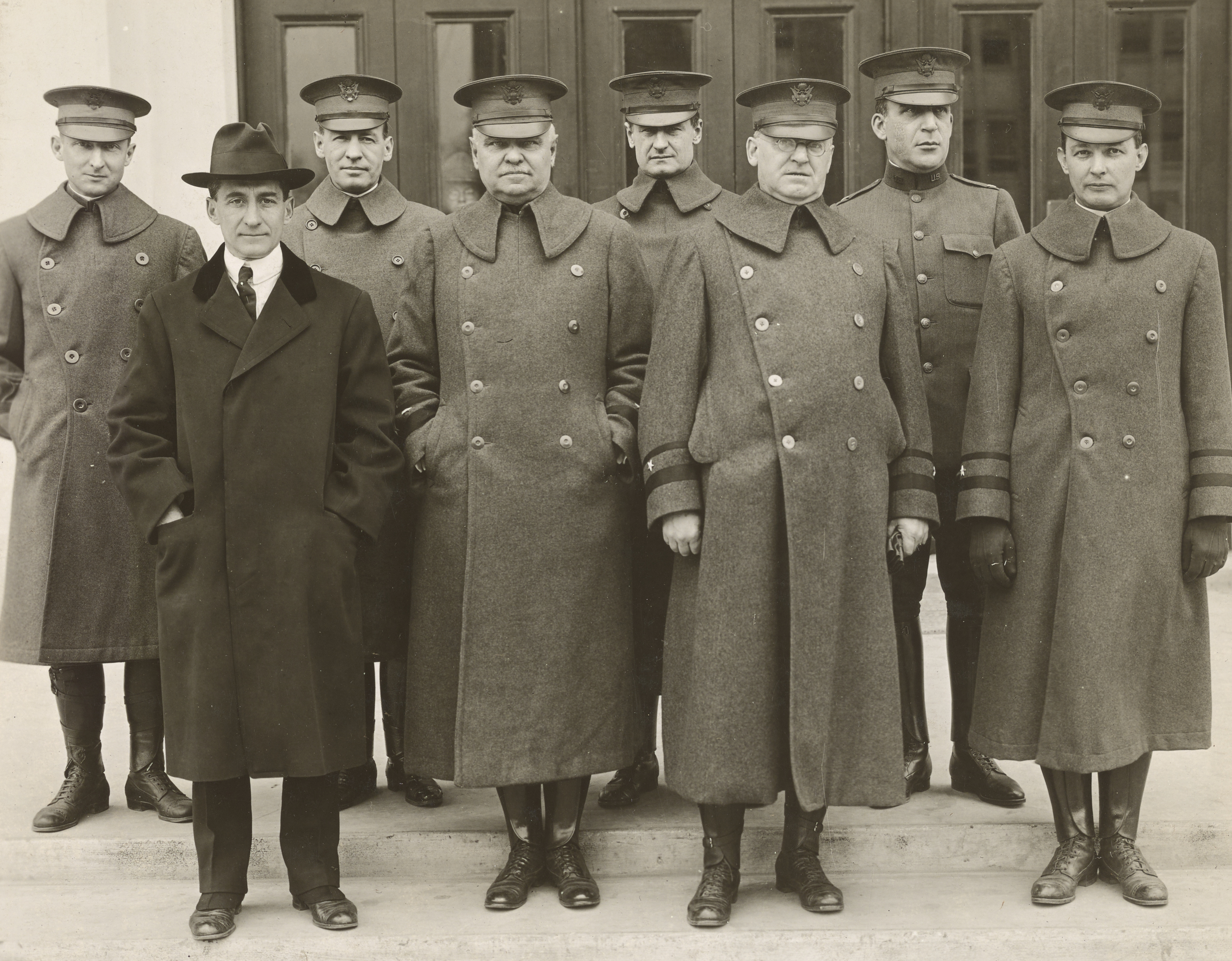
Major General George W. Goethals and members of his staff, December 7, 1918. Front row, left to right: Mr. Gerard Swope, Major General George W. Goethals, Brigadier General Herbert Lord, Brigadier General William H. Rose. Back row, left to right: Edwin W. Fullam, Brigadier General Frank T. Hines, Brigadier General Robert E. Wood, Colonel F. B. Wells.

The Overman Act, a result of the Congressional investigations started in December 1917, authorized what became known as the "interbureau procurement system," and was to make the Quartermaster Corps the most important War Department purchasing agency. Goethals established a system of standardization of bureau record keeping and supply chain planning. He also worked on installing uniform procurement policies, with the goal of presenting consolidated estimates to congress.

In April 1918 a further reorganization of the General Staff led to the creation of the Purchase, Storage, & Traffic Division, with General Goethals as Director and Assistant Chief of Staff of the Army. Its creation was the result of protests by General Goethals, to the effect that, though coordination in the handling of Army logistics problems had been a major objective when the General Staff was created in 1903, coordination was practically nonexistent. In the months to come, his division took control of purchasing and storage by the Army as a whole and of transportation over land and water. Now one person coordinated all supply bureaus, which had previously competed for the nation's resources, in a system that had inevitably slowed down input of war supplies.

At a meeting of quartermaster personnel in Washington, on August 8, 1918, Secretary of War Baker said:

How fortunate this great army is to have so good and able a provider. Indeed, when the history of this war comes to be written, there will be chapters which have, up to now, almost escaped .... Today, I had a letter from General John J. Pershing in which he was commenting upon the perfection of supplies on the other side....

France and England were not the only overseas destinations for quartermaster supplies. Among others were Italy, Hawaii, the Philippines, Puerto Rico, China, Russia, and Siberia. In a talk General Wood made at this meeting he mentioned that:

... to handle this task, there are now in the Quartermaster Corps over eight thousand officers, one hundred and fifty-five thousand enlisted men, and sixty-five thousand civilian employees, and that number is being increased all the time to keep pace with the wants of our constantly increasing Army.

In 1919, Goethals requested his release from active service.

=== Honors and awards ===
For his World War I service General Goethals, who retired March 1, 1919—and whom General Peyton C. March, the Army Chief of Staff, called "a great engineer, a great soldier, and the greatest Chief of Supply produced by any nation in the World War "—was awarded the Army Distinguished Service Medal; was named Commander of the Legion of Honor by France and Honorary Knight Commander, by Great Britain; and was awarded the British Order of St. Michael & St. George and the Grand Cordon of the Order of Wen Hu by China. Previously he had been awarded many medals by scientific and geographic societies and some fifteen honorary degrees by universities and colleges. The citation for his Army DSM reads:

The President of the United States of America, authorized by Act of Congress, July 9, 1918, takes pleasure in presenting the Army Distinguished Service Medal to Major General George Washington Goethals, United States Army, for exceptionally meritorious and distinguished services to the Government of the United States, in a duty of great responsibility during World War I, in reorganizing the Quartermaster Department and in organizing and administering the Division of Purchase, Storage, and Traffic during the war.

== Civilian life ==
Later on, he headed an engineering and construction firm. He became the first consulting engineer of the Port of New York Authority (now the Port Authority of New York and New Jersey or PANYNJ). Both the original Goethals Bridge and the current Goethals Bridge, which the PANYNJ operates between New York and New Jersey, were named for him. Goethals was an elected member of the American Academy of Arts and Sciences, the American Philosophical Society, and the United States National Academy of Sciences.

== Personal life and death ==
In 1884, he married Effie Rodman; they had two sons. Goethals, after having been discovered to have terminal lung cancer in September 1927, died at the age of 69, "surrounded by his wife and two sons", at his apartment at 12 East 86th Street in Manhattan, New York City on January 21, 1928. He was buried at the cemetery of the United States Military Academy at West Point.

== Legacy and tributes ==
- In 1917, the American Society of Mechanical Engineers elected Goethals an honorary member.
- In World War II, the United States liberty ship, USNS George W. Goethals (T-AP-182), was named in his honor.
- The United States Army Corps of Engineers dredge Goethals, which operated 1937–1982, was named in his honor.
- The Goethals Medal was named after him, awarded by the Society of American Military Engineers for eminent contributions to engineering and related fields.
- The Goethals Bridge between Staten Island, New York City, and Elizabeth, New Jersey, also bears his name.
- Goethals Road North on Staten Island, New York City, bears his name.
- Goethals Avenue in Queens, New York City, bears his name.
- Streets are named for him in Richland, Washington, in Queens, New York City, at St. John's University, in Fort Leonard Wood and in Gamboa, Panama.
- His image is depicted on several US and Panama Canal Zone stamps.
- The Goethals Monument was built in Panama City in 1954.
- Goethalsia, a monotypic genus of flowering plants from Central America. Was named after him.
- He is the great-great-grandfather of actress Angela Goethals.
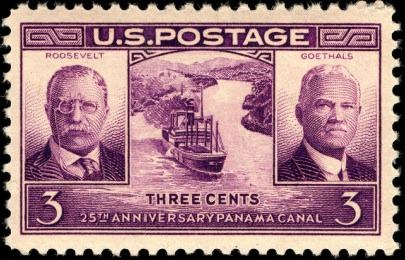
Roosevelt and Goethals on US stamp, 1939

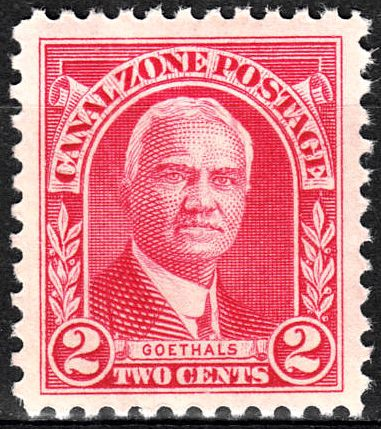
Goethals on Canal Zone postage stamp, 1928

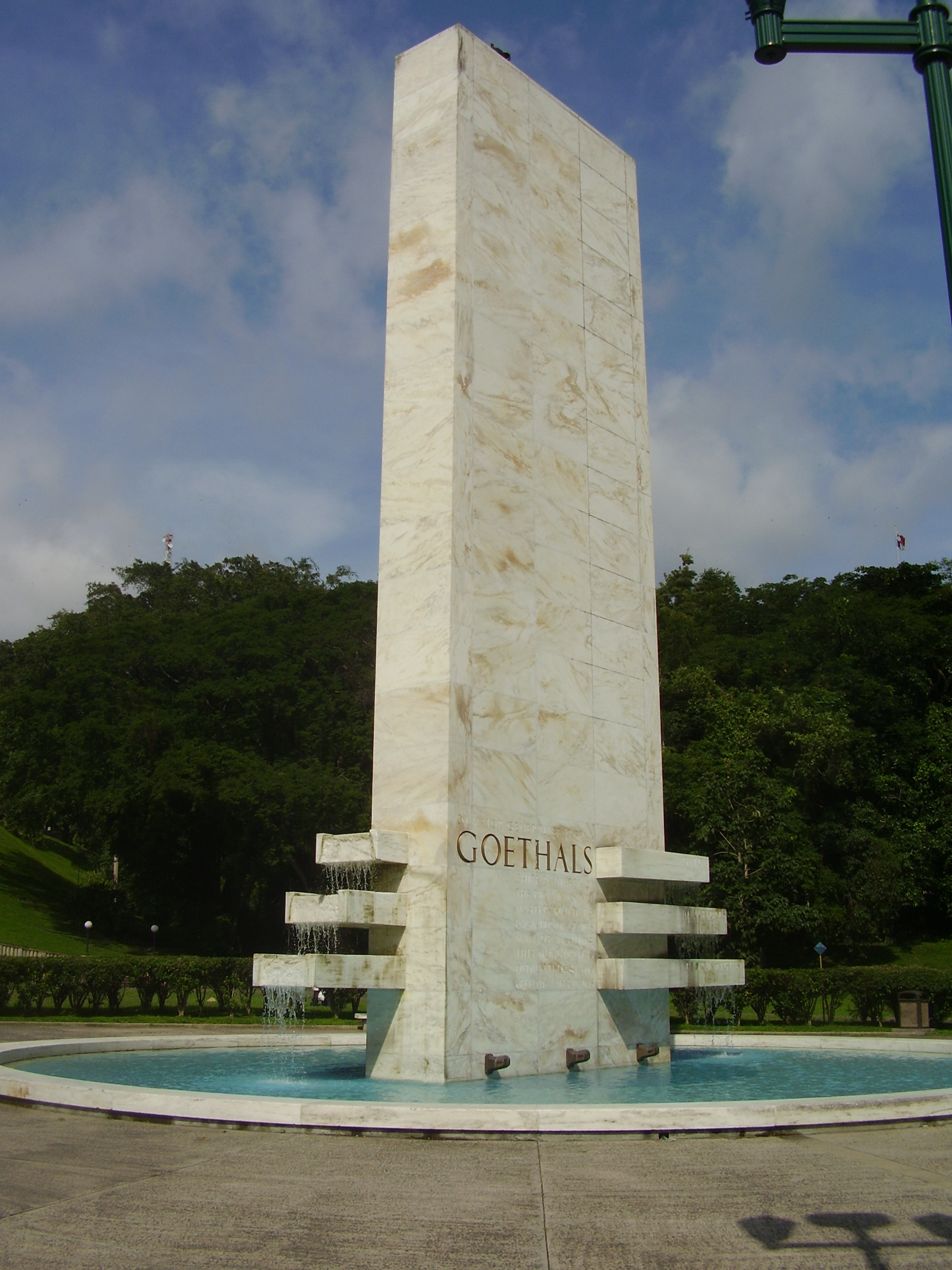
Goethals Monument, Panama City

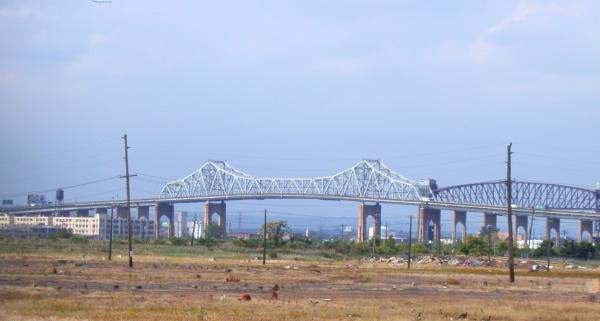
Goethals Bridge

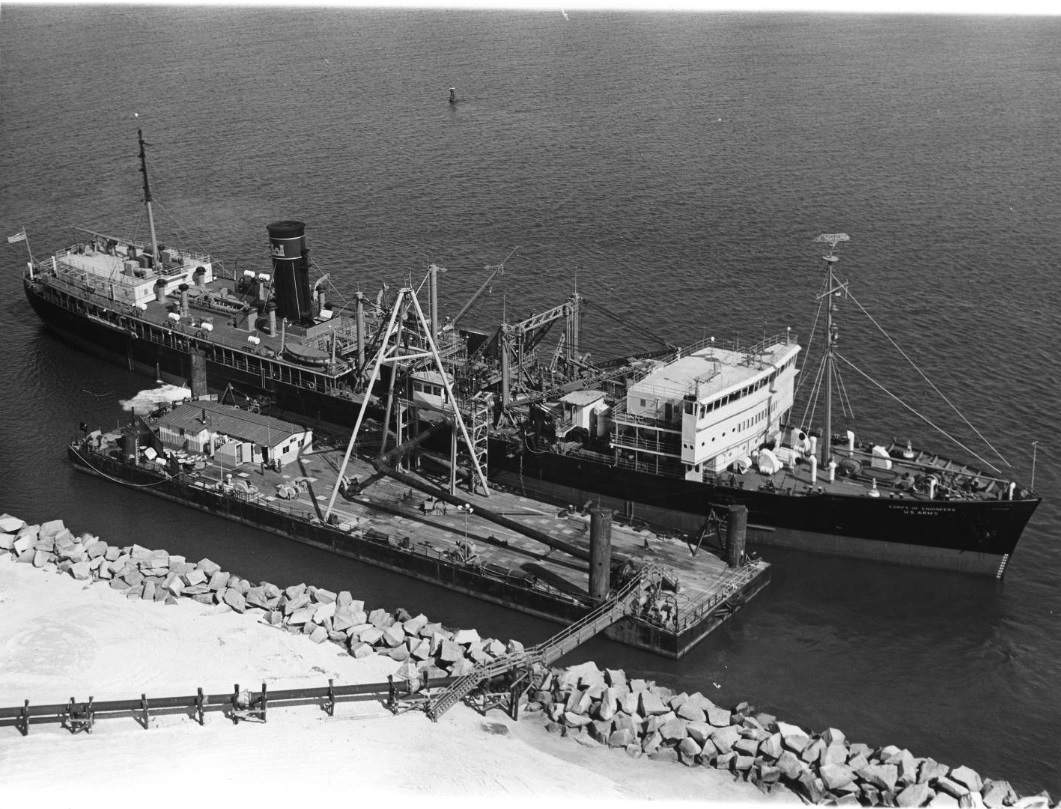
Dredge Goethals

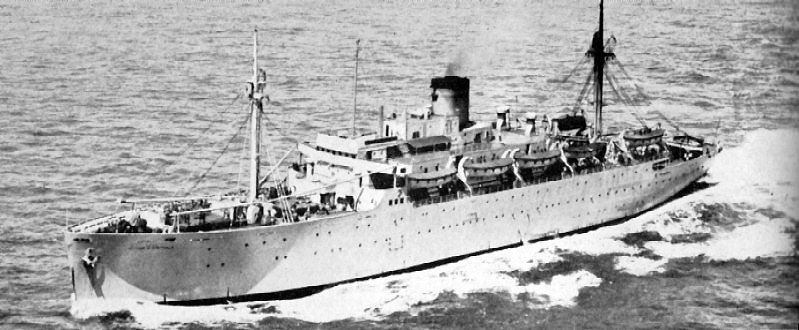
USNS George W. Goethals

== See also ==
- History of the Panama Canal
- Postage stamps and postal history of the Canal Zone

Preceded by Military Governor Richard Lee Metcalfe	Governor of Panama Canal Zone; 1914–1917	Succeeded by Chester Harding
