= Ernest Joseph Blondlat =

French divisional general (1862–1938)

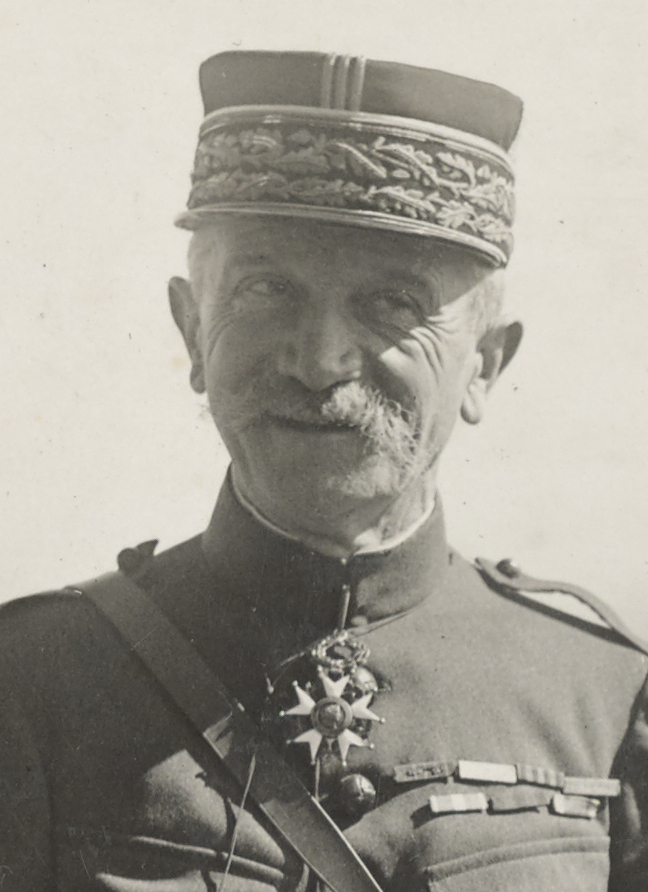
- General Blondlat in 1918
- Born: December 2, 1862; Charleville-Mézières, Ardennes, France
- Died: August 22, 1938 (aged 75); Menet, Cantal, France
- Education: École spéciale militaire de Saint-Cyr
- Military career
- Allegiance: France
- Branch: French Army
- Service years: 1881 – 1924
- Rank: Général de Division
- Commands: 2nd Colonial Army Corps; Moroccan Division
- Conflicts: Sino-French War; First Franco-Dahomean War; Second Franco-Dahomean War; World War I: Western Front; First Battle of the Marne; Battle of the Marshes of Saint-Gond; Second Battle of the Aisne; Battle of the Somme; Battle of Saint-Mihiel

Ernest Joseph Blondlat (2 December 1862 – 22 August 1938) was a French divisional general who participated in World War I. During the war, he was a commander of the 2nd Colonial Army Corps as well as the Moroccan Division.

== Early career ==
Ernest was born on December 2, 1862, as the son of Claude Nicolas and Marie Dumagnon at Charleville-Mézières.

Ernest Blondlat enlisted in the École spéciale militaire de Saint-Cyr as a student of the Class of Egypt from October 29, 1881, to October 1, 1883. He took part in the Sino-French War, the First Franco-Dahomean War and the Second Franco-Dahomean War. Major Blondlat then went to French Madagascar in 1899, where he served under the orders of General Hubert Lyautey. Seriously wounded during the Siege of Androy in October 1901, he later came back from January to April 1902, seizing 4,500 rifles. Blondlat was appointed colonel in 1905 and he commanded Tonkinese units in 1907. In Morocco, from August to September 1912, he commanded the column of the Zaers at the Battle of El-Fedj. He was promoted to brigadier general in 1913.

== World War I ==
At the outbreak of World War I, Blondlat was at the head of the 1st Brigade of the Moroccan Division with many reforms under his command as well as personally knowing all the men within his brigade. He took part in the First Battle of the Marne, fighting with his unit west during the Battle of the Marshes of Saint-Gond. He took command of the Moroccan Division from September 14, 1914 to June 26, 1915. He obtained two commands while at the 10th Army. In June 1915, he was in command of the 2nd Colonial Army Corps and participated at the head of his unit in the Champagne offensive of September 1915. Still in command of the 2nd Colonial Corps, he participated in the battles of the Somme, Second Aisne and the Battle of Saint-Mihiel.

== Post-war life ==
After the Armistice of 11 November 1918 signed, General Blondlat commanded the 1st French Military Region in Lille until October 1919. From April 1921 to December 1924, he was at the head of the troops of French Indochina.

=== General Blondlat's Flight ===
In April 1922, Major General Ernest Blondlat, now the superior commander of the troops of the Indochina soldiers, expressed the wish to go from Saigon to Hanoï by air with six Bréguet 14's. The first stage of Saigon to Quy Nhon was over 595 kilometers with a stopover in Phan Rang, was covered on April 4 aboard three seaplanes from the 2nd Squadron. The second stage of Qui Nhon to Huế was over 400 km with a stopover in Tourane and Lieutenant Dumas took the general to the capital of Annam where he stayed for two days. The third stage of Hué to Hanoï was over 600 km with a stopover in Vinh, involveing three land-based Bréguet 14s piloted by François Glaize who took General Blondlat on board. The two men landed in the morning of April 8 at the Bach Maï field where they were welcomed by Major General Jean-Paul Sicre, commander of the Annam-Tonkin division. Ernest Blondlat completed the 1,600 km trip in 14 hours and 35 minutes of flight with an average speed of 110 km/h.

== Awards ==
- Legion of Honor
  - Grand Officer (June 16, 1920)
  - Commander (August 10, 1914)
  - Officer (July 13, 1903)

=== Foreign Awards ===
- Russia: Order of St. George, 4th Class (January 1915)
- United States: Distinguished Service Medal (July 9, 1918)
