= Logistics in World War I =

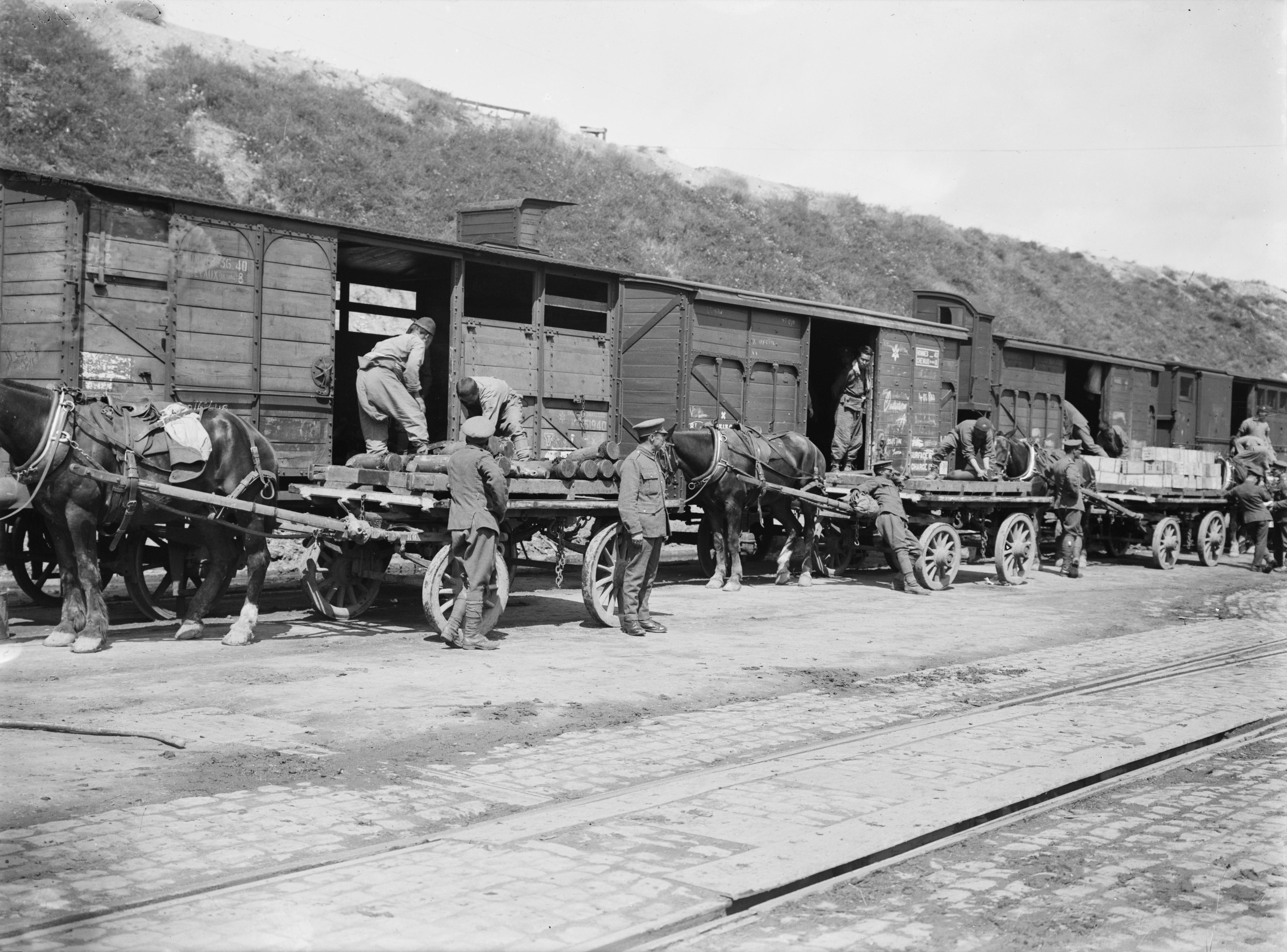
Members of the Chinese Labour Corps loading 9.2-inch (230 mm) shells onto a railway wagon at Boulogne for transport to the front line, August 1917

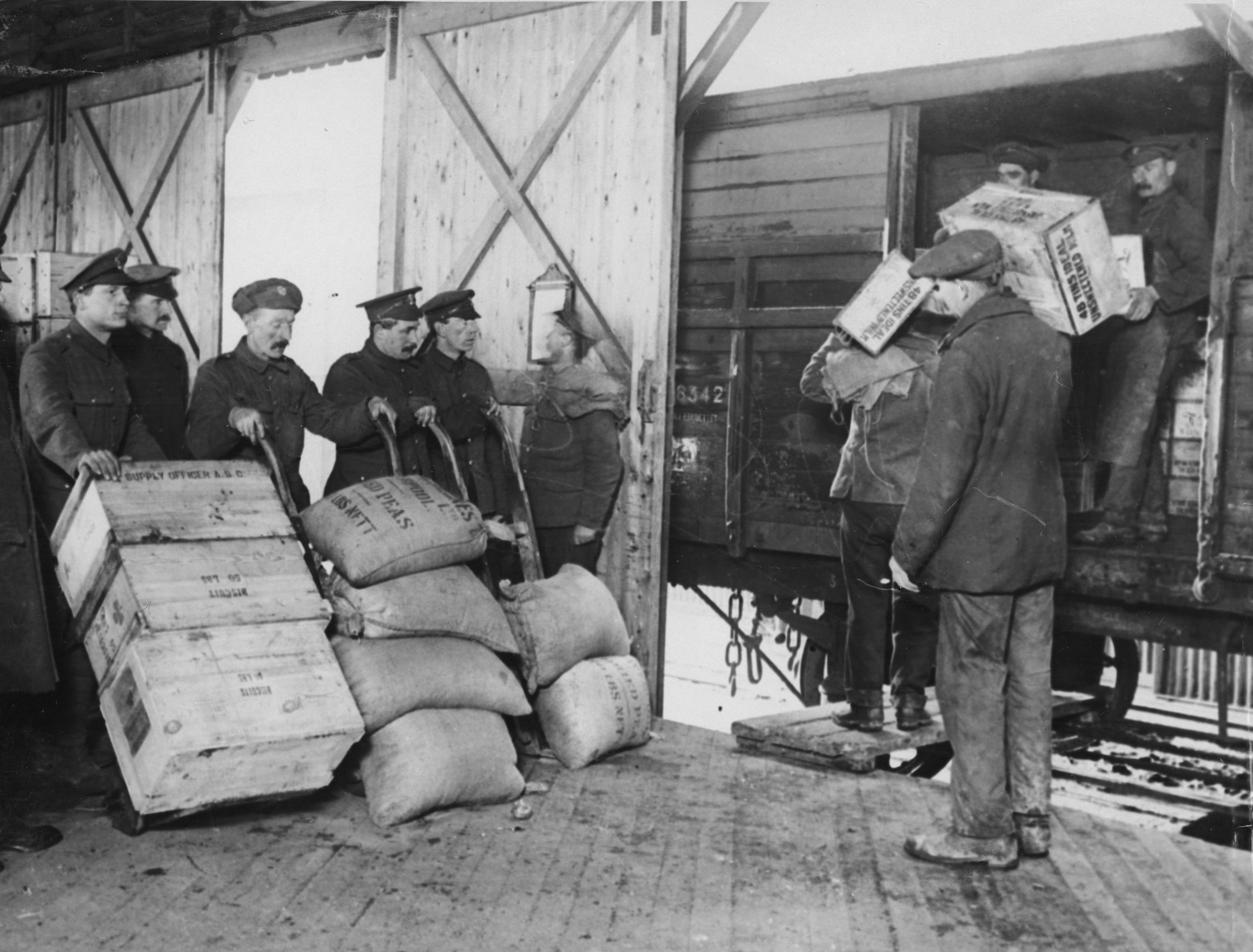
The Army Service Corps loading military rations from a shed into a train. The supplies include crates of biscuits, sacks of dried peas and boxes of tinned Ideal milk.

Logistics in World War I was the organising and delivery of supplies to the armed forces of World War I.

== Initial stages of the war ==
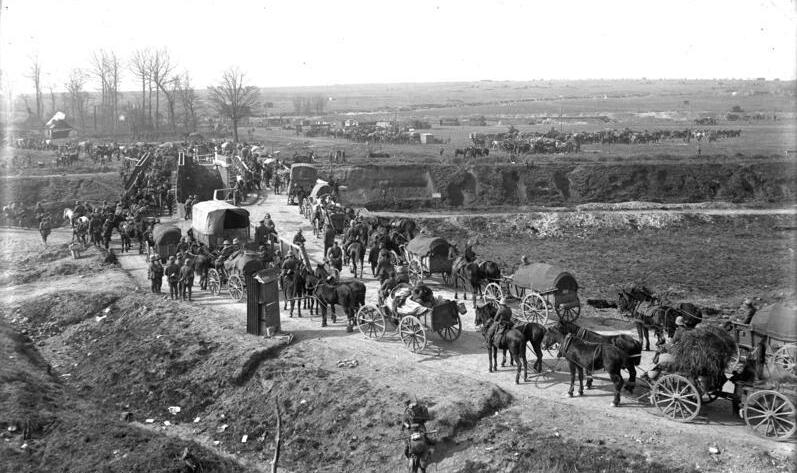
German supply train bottleneck in front of two provisional bridges near Étricourt, France, during Operation Michael, 24 March 1918

With the expansion of military conscription and reserve systems in the decades leading up to the 20th century, the potential size of armies increased substantially, while the industrialization of firepower (bolt-action rifles with higher rate-of-fire, larger and more artillery, plus machine guns) was starting to multiply the potential amount munitions they required. Military logistical systems, however, continued to rely on 19th century technology.

The main method of transportation of supplies at the start of the war was still by horse due to the lack of available alternatives in 1914, similar to that of the inclusion of cavalry within the armed forces, and the fast pace of the war in the first part of the war. When World War I started, the capabilities of rail and horse-drawn supply were stretched to their limits. As the war progressed it became increasingly difficult to supply soldiers in the traditional way by horse and carriage due to conditions at the front. The supply routes became muddy and impassable, improvement to artillery on both sides and other tactics meant that supplies became increasingly delivered under cover of night and were considerably slowed down.

== Trench warfare and blockade of Germany ==
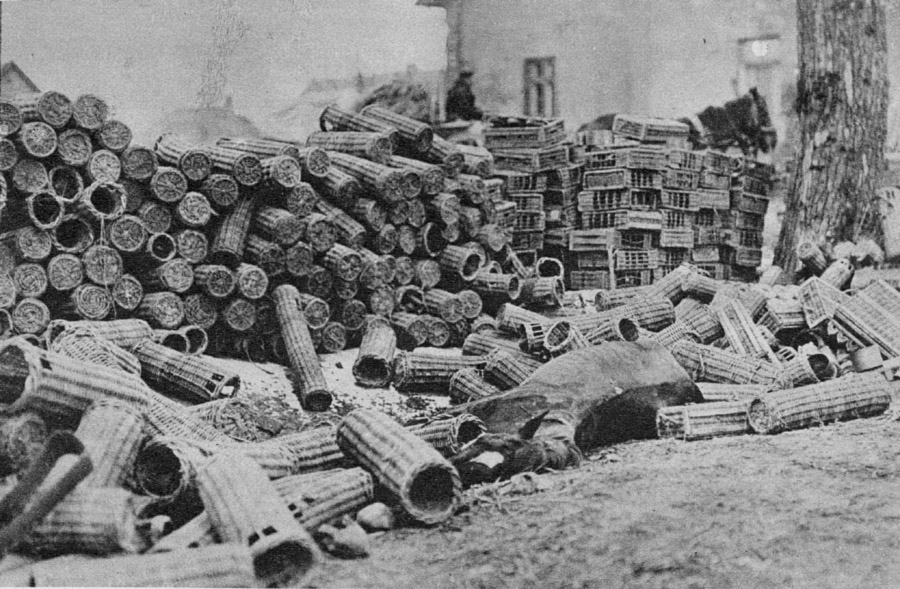
Russian ammunition baskets for heavy artillery shells. Supplying the artillery of WWI was a challenge which, for Britain, resulted in the Shell Crisis of 1915.

However, as the war ground down into static trench warfare it became easier for armies to support their troops with the use of the railway, especially for the artillery. This made the transportation of supplies easier and quicker to get from the factories to the front line. This did have problems of their own, as seen by the Shell Crisis of 1915. Where the stalemate of trench warfare took hold, special narrow gauge trench railways were built to extend the rail network to the front lines. The great size of the German Army proved too much for its railways to support except while immobile. Tactical successes like Operation Michael devolved into operational failures where logistics failed to keep up with the army's advance over shell-torn ground.

On the seas, the British blockade of Germany kept a stranglehold on raw materials, goods, and food needed to support Germany's war efforts, and is considered one of the key elements in the eventual Allied victory in the war. On the Allied Side a huge producer of supplies was the United States of America, meaning the supplies had to be transported over the Atlantic Ocean to England and France. At the same time, Germany's unrestricted submarine warfare showed the vulnerability of shipping lanes despite Allied naval superiority. This revolutionised how war shipping was conducted and saw the first use of military convoys to counter the threat caused by German U-Boats.

In June 1918 the Allies organized the Military Board of Allied Supply, which proved to be an invaluable mechanism for coordinating logistical requirements for armies working in close proximity during the final battles that autumn. The Board's report contains overviews of the logistical systems for the principal Allied armies.

== United States ==
The trans-Atlantic distances and the American inexperience at large scale operations combined to make support of the American Expeditionary Forces (AEF) extraordinarily difficult. Mass production of munitions, including cargo ships, did not reach full potential until near the end of the war. In the meantime, the United States relied upon European allies for most weapons and upon Britain for shipping. In France, the Americans built or improved ports, railroads, depots, and other facilities to move the supplies to the front. Slowly the Americans learned the multiple functions associated with supporting a large-scale conflict, which allowed the AEF to operate as an independent force. Experience gained in World War I proved invaluable during later conflicts.

== See also ==
- Military logistics
- Blockade of Germany
- First World War glass–rubber exchange
- Services of Supply, American Expeditionary Forces
