= Goethals (dredge) =

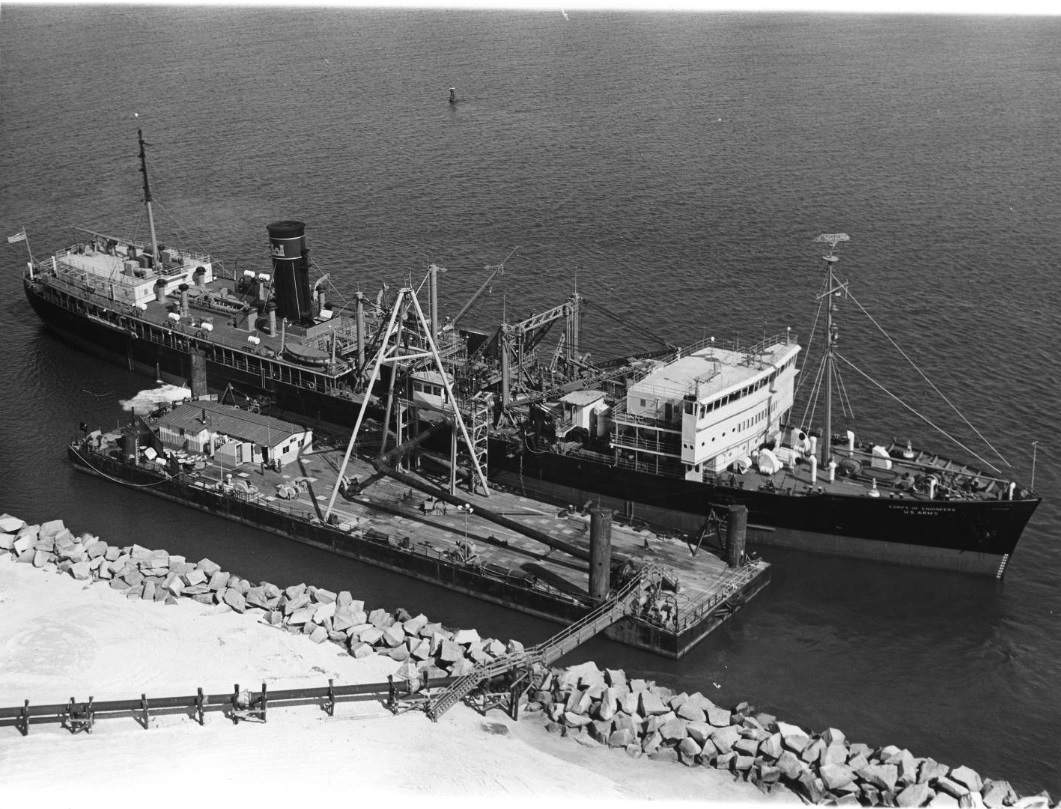

History
- Name: Goethals
- Owner: United States Army
- Operator: United States Army Corps of Engineers
- Laid down: 5 October 1936
- Launched: August 1937
- Completed: December 1937 (Delivered)
- Fate: Retired 1982

General characteristics
- Length: 476 ft (145.1 m)
- Beam: 69 ft (21.0 m)
- Draft: 29 ft (8.8 m)
- Depth: 36 ft (11.0 m)
- Propulsion: Twin screw, Turbo-electric, 6,000 hp.
- Capacity: 6,422 cubic yards (4,910.0 m^{3})
- Notes: 2 30 inch dredge pumps, 1,300 hp hopper, 3,000 hp pump out

Goethals was an ocean-going hopper dredge operated by the United States Army Corps of Engineers named for George Washington Goethals, who supervised much of the building of the Panama Canal.

The dredge's keel was laid at Bethlehem Shipbuilding Corporation's Fore River Plant, Quincy, Massachusetts, on 5 October 1936 with launch in August 1937 and delivery in December. The dredge was operated under the direction of the Philadelphia District of the United States Army Corps of Engineers until its retirement in 1982.
