= Guy Hartcup =

- Born: 13 May 1919
- Died: 18 March 2012 (aged 92)
- Occupation: Historian

Guy Hartcup (13 May 1919 – 18 March 2012) was an author and military historian. His published works focused on the history of 20th-century military technology.

== Publications ==
- The challenge of war: Britain's scientific and engineering contributions to World War Two, Taplinger Pub. Co, 1970, ISBN 0800814312
- Achievement of the airship : a history of the development of rigid, semi-rigid, and non-rigid airships, David & Charles, 1974, ISBN 0-7153-6551-7
- Camouflage : a history of concealment and deception in war, David & Charles, 1979, ISBN 0-7153-7733-7
- Code name Mulberry : the planning, building, and operation of the Normandy harbours, Hippocrene Books, 1977, ISBN 0-88254-443-8
- Effect of science on the Second World War, Macmillan, Palgrave, 2000, ISBN 0-333-67061-2
- Hartcup, Guy (1993), Silent revolution : the development of conventional weapons, 1945-85, Brassey's Defence Publishers, ISBN 0-08-036702-X
- Hartcup, Guy (1988), War of invention : scientific developments, 1914-18, Brassey's Defence Publishers, ISBN 0-08-033591-8
