= Mitchell Yockelson =

American military historian

Mitchell A. Yockelson
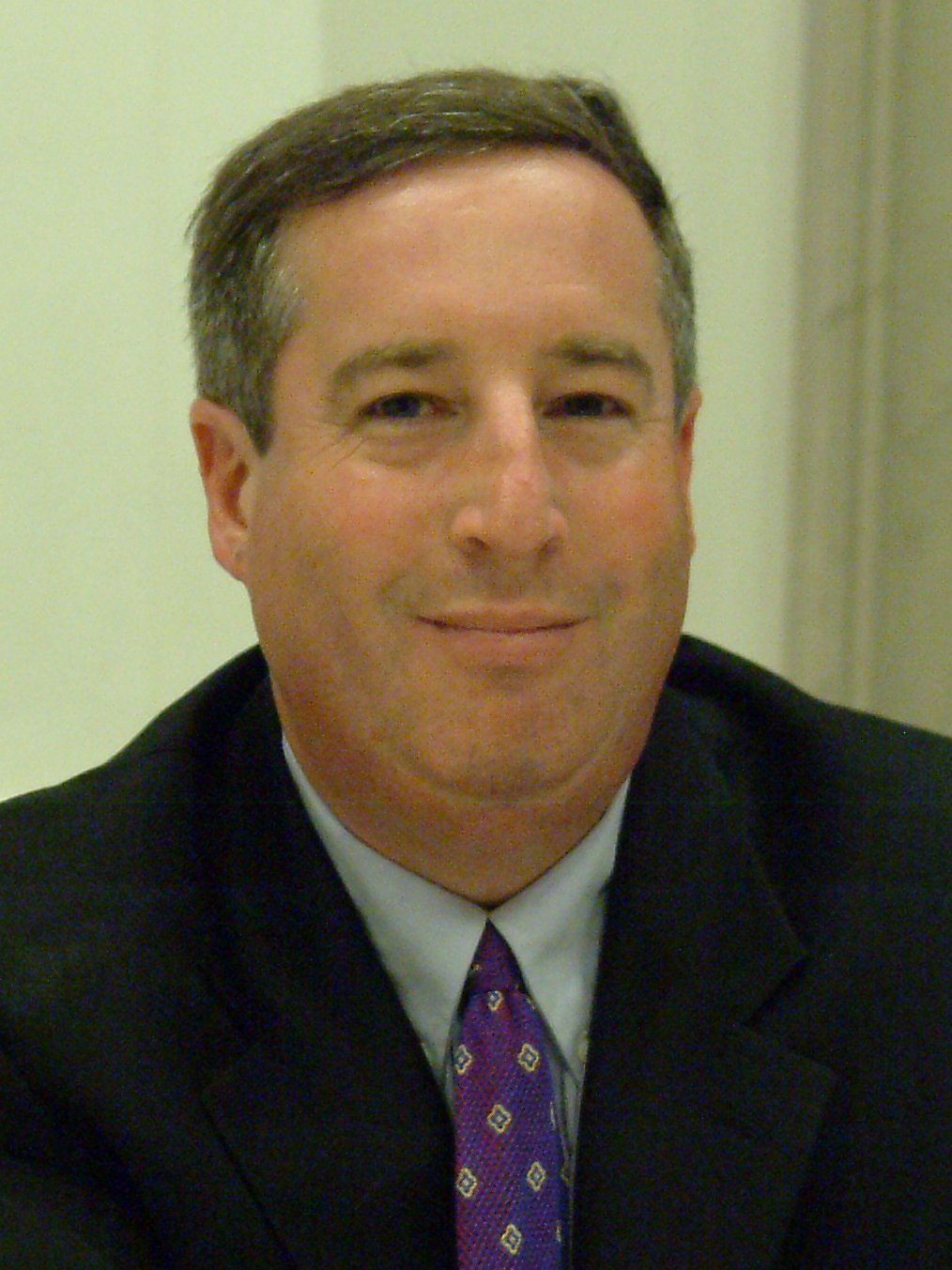
- Yokelson in 2008
- Born: 22 March 1962 (age 64)
- Education: History, Military History
- Alma mater: Frostburg State University (BS); George Mason University (MA); Royal Military College of Science, Cranfield University (Ph.D.)
- Occupations: Military historian, archivist, writer, and professor
- Writing career
- Subject: World War I

Mitchell "Mitch" A. Yockelson (born 22 March 1962) is a military historian and archivist. He has written four books including, Borrowed Soldiers: Americans Under British Command 1918, and numerous articles for well-known publications. Currently he teaches at Norwich University, and works as an Investigative Archivist at the National Archives and Records Administration. Yockelson resides in Annapolis.

== Education ==
In 1984, Yockelson graduated from Frostburg State University with his undergraduate degree in history. He earned his Master's degree in history from George Mason University. Afterwards Yockelson graduated from the Royal Military College of Science, Cranfield University with his Ph.D. in military history.

== Career ==
Yockelson began working at the National Archives and Records Administration (NARA) in 1988. He started off as a military history specialist in military records. He currently works as an investigative archivist in the Office of the Inspector General at NARA. His main duty is to investigate stolen historical document cases. He is also the head of the Archivist Recovery Team (ART) at NARA.

Previously Yockelson was a professor of military history at the United States Naval Academy. He currently teaches graduate programs in military history at Norwich University.

Yockelson is the author of four books. His first book, Borrowed Soldiers: Americans Under British Command 1918 was named by London Independent as one of the best books on military history in 2008. It originated from his dissertation on the United States Army during World War I. He is the recipient of the Army Historical Foundation's Distinguished Writing Award.

As an expert on World War I and military history, Yockelson lectures internationally and has acted as consultant for programs on the History Channel, PBS, 60 Minutes, Fox News, and The Pentagon Channel. He has also been featured in the Los Angeles Times, The New York Times, The Wall Street Journal, and The Washington Post. On a regular basis, Yockelson leads tours of World War I battlefields for the Smithsonian Journeys and New York Times Journeys.

Yockelson is an historical advisor to the U.S. World War I Centennial Commission.

== Published work ==
- Forty-Seven Days: How Pershing's Warriors Came of Age to Defeat the German Army in World War I. 2016. New American Library. ISBN 9780451466952. OCLC 911068453
- Grant: Savior of the Union. 2012. Thomas Nelson. ISBN 9781595554529. OCLC 759911876
- MacArthur: Defiant Soldier. 2011. Thomas Nelson. ISBN 9781595552921 OCLC 644683762
- Borrowed Soldiers: Americans Under British Command, 1918. 2008. University of Oklahoma Press. ISBN 9780806139197 OCLC 171287665
