= USNS George W. Goethals =

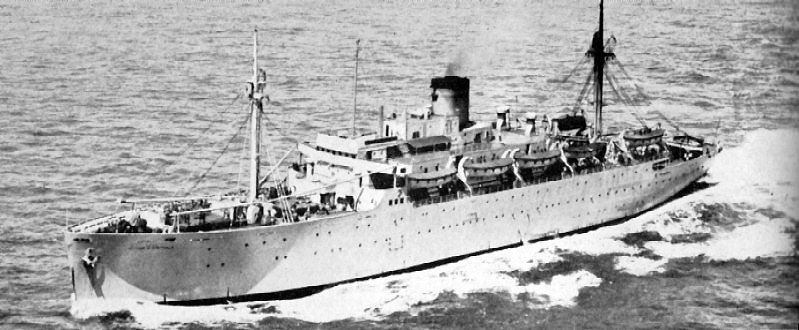
- USNS George W. Goethals (T-AP-182), c. 1952

History

United States
- Name: USNS George W. Goethals (T-AP-182)
- Namesake: U.S. Army General George W. Goethals
- Builder: Ingalls Shipbuilding
- Laid down: 7 January 1941
- Launched: 23 January 1942
- Sponsored by: Mrs Hermes F. Gautier
- Christened: Pascagoula
- Acquired: (By the Army): 18 September 1942
- In service: Army: 18 September 1942 - 1950; MSTS: 1 March 1950 - 29 September 1959
- Renamed: George W. Goethals (September 1942)
- Identification: MC hull type C3-IN P&C, MC hull no. 109
- Fate: Scrapped 1971

General characteristics
- Displacement: 10,418 tons
- Length: 489 ft
- Beam: 69 ft 6 in
- Draft: 27 ft 4 in
- Propulsion: Steam turbine, single propeller
- Speed: 16.5 knots
- Troops: 1,976

USNS George W. Goethals (T-AP-182) was a troop transport that served with the United States Military Sea Transportation Service (MSTS) during the 1950s. Prior to her MSTS service, she served as U.S. Army transport USAT George W. Goethals during World War II.

George W. Goethals was laid down under Maritime Commission contract 7 January 1941 by the Ingalls Shipbuilding Company of Pascagoula, Mississippi; launched as Pascagoula 23 January 1942; delivered to the Army 18 September 1942; and renamed after the builder of the Panama Canal George W. Goethals.

== World War II ==
During World War II George W. Goethals operated as an Army transport out of New York City, Boston, and Gulf Coast ports to ports in North Africa, France, and the United Kingdom. After the war, she continued transatlantic runs carrying military dependents between the United States and Europe.

== Postwar Navy service ==
Acquired by the U.S. Navy on 1 March 1950, the transport was assigned to MSTS. Crewed by civilians, George W. Goethals continued trooplift and passenger voyages out of New York.

During the Korean War she helped to maintain American military strength in Europe and the Middle East. Transporting troops and military cargo, she steamed to England, Germany, North Africa, Italy, Greece, and Turkey during European and Mediterranean deployments. In addition, she rotated troops to American bases in the Caribbean. In 1953, for example, she completed 12 round-trip voyages out of New York to Cuba, Puerto Rico, and the Canal Zone.

Between 1955 and 1959 George W. Goethals continued a busy, far-ranging deployment schedule. During this period she deployed 18 times to ports in Western Europe and three times to the Mediterranean, and she completed 30 round trips to the Caribbean. Placed in a ready reserve status from 15 December 1958 to 21 February 1959, she made a run to Bremerhaven and back during February and March. In the next 6 months, she deployed to the Caribbean seven times.

== Inactivation ==
After returning to New York 29 September 1959, she was inactivated. Transferred to the Maritime Administration 20 November 1960 she entered the National Defense Reserve Fleet, and was berthed in the Hudson River at Jones Point, New York. She was scrapped in 1971.
