= Flood Control Act =

Flood Control Acts
- Other short titles: Flood Control Act of 1917; Flood Control Act of 1928; Flood Control Act of 1936; Flood Control Act of 1938; Flood Control Act of 1941; Flood Control Act of 1944
- Long title: A collective series of Acts authorizing the construction of civil engineering public works on rivers and harbors for nationwide flood control, and for other purposes.

Legislative history
- Introduced in the House of Representatives; Signed into law by President Woodrow Wilson (1917); Calvin Coolidge (1928); Franklin D. Roosevelt (1936, 1938, 1941, 1944) on various

In the United States, there are multiple laws known as the Flood Control Act (FCA). Typically, they are enacted to control irrigation because of floods or other natural disasters and are administered by the United States Army Corps of Engineers. These laws were enacted beginning in 1917, with the most recent one being passed in 1965.

== Background ==
There were several major floods between 1849 and 1936 that moved Congress to pass legislation. The first significant federal flood control law was the Swamp Land Act of 1850. A flood on the Mississippi River in 1874 led to the creation of the Mississippi River Commission in 1879. Booming steamboat traffic on the Missouri River and a flood in 1881 led to the creation of the Missouri River Commission in 1884, but it was abolished by the River and Harbor Act of 1902. Floods on the Mississippi, Ohio, and other rivers in the Northeast led to the Flood Control Act of 1917, which was the first act aimed exclusively at controlling floods. The Great Mississippi Flood of 1927 led to substantial flood control funding. And a series of floods in 1935 and 1936 across the nation were critical in the passage of the Flood Control Act of 1936.

== List of Flood Control Acts ==
- Flood Control Act of 1917
- Flood Control Act of 1928, passed in the wake of the Great Mississippi Flood of 1927. FCA 1928 had three important effects. It increased public awareness of advances in flood control theory and practice. It put flood control on par with other major projects of its time with the largest public works appropriation ever authorized. And, FCA 1928 increased debate on local contributions to a new level.
- Flood Control Act of 1936. FCA 1936 was part of the profusion of important Depression Era legislation enacted by the 74th Congress in 1935–1936, including the Social Security Act, the National Labor Relations Act, the Banking Act of 1935, the Wealth Tax Act, the Public Utility Holding Company Act, the Rural Electrification Act, the Soil Conservation Service Act, and the $4.8 billion Emergency Relief Appropriation Act of 1935.
- Flood Control Act of 1937
- Flood Control Act of 1938
- Flood Control Act of 1939. FCA 1939 was instrumental in establishing the Federal policy of Cost-benefit analysis, the standard by which the government determines whether or not a project provides sufficient benefits to justify the cost of expending public funds. It specified the standard that "the benefits to whomever they accrue [be] in excess of the estimated costs.
- Flood Control Act of 1941
- Flood Control Act of 1944, also known as the Pick–Sloan Flood Control Act of 1944. The Lakota, Dakota, and Nakota tribes lost 202,000 acres (820 km^{2}). The Three Affiliated Tribes, specifically, lost 155,000 acres (630 km^{2}) in their Fort Berthold Reservation due to the building of the Garrison Dam. This project caused more than 1,500 American Indians to relocate from the river bottoms of the Missouri river due to the flooding.
- Flood Control Act of 1946
- Flood Control Act of 1948. FCA 1948 gave the Chief of Engineers the power to authorize minor flood control projects without having to get Congressional approval. It also authorized several larger flood control projects and amended the budget set forth in the Flood Control Act of 1946.
- Flood Control Act of 1950. The Act was prompted in part by floods that swept through the Columbia River watershed in 1948, destroying Vanport, then the second largest city in Oregon, and impacting cities as far north as Trail, British Columbia. By that time, local communities had become wary of federal hydroelectric projects, and sought local control of new developments; a public utility district in Grant County, Washington, ultimately began construction of the dam at Priest Rapids.
- Flood Control Act of 1965. Prior to 1965, the state of Louisiana designed and built its flood protection through its levee boards. After Hurricane Betsy, Congress gave control of the flood protection to the US Army Corps of Engineers in the Act which called for a flood protection system to protect south Louisiana from the worst storms characteristic of the region. When Katrina struck in 2005, the project was between 60–90% complete and the projected date of completion was estimated to be 2015. The initial scope of the project was to provide hurricane protection to areas around the lake in the parishes of Orleans, Jefferson, St. Bernard, and St. Charles with the federal government paying 70 percent of the costs and the state and local interests paying 30 percent, the typical cost-share arrangement.

== See also ==
- Rivers and Harbors Act
- Water Resources Development Act
- Watershed Protection and Flood Prevention Act of 1954
