= March 1917 =

Month in 1917

<<	March 1917					>>
Su	Mo	Tu	We	Th	Fr	Sa
				1	2	3
4	5	6	7	8	9	10
11	12	13	14	15	16	17
18	19	20	21	22	23	24
25	26	27	28	29	30	31

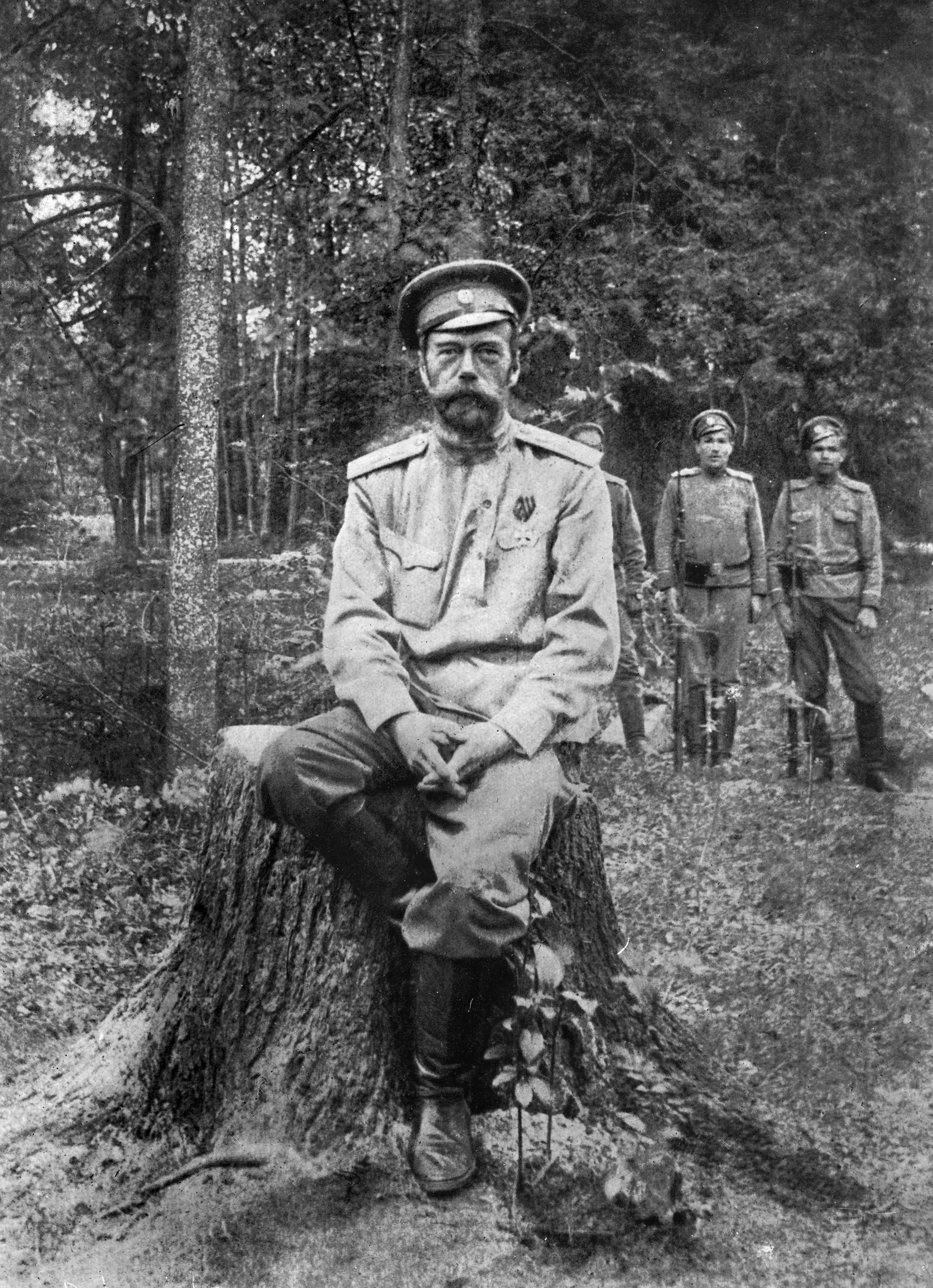
Tsar Nicholas after abdicating the throne of the Russian Empire.

The following events occurred in March 1917:

== March 1, 1917 (Thursday) ==
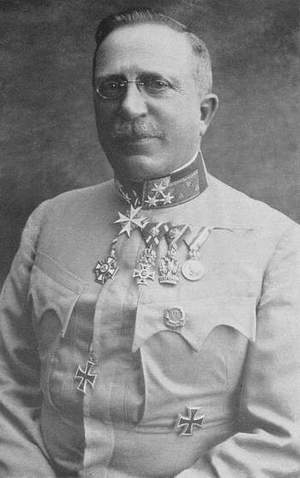
Arthur Arz von Straußenburg

- Colonel General Arthur Arz von Straußenburg replaced Field Marshal Franz Conrad von Hötzendorf to become the last Chief of the Austro-Hungarian General Staff. Conrad was given command of the South Tyrolean Army Group.
- Toplica Uprising – Serbian Chetniks occupied Lebane, Serbia as part of efforts to liberate the country from the Central Powers.
- Royal Navy destroyer HMS Pheasant struck a mine and sank in the Atlantic Ocean west of Orkney with the loss of 88 crew.
- British hospital ship HMHS Glenart Castle struck a mine and was damaged in the English Channel. She was repaired and returned to service.
- The U.S. government enacted the Flood Control Act in order to respond to costly floods in the Mississippi River and Ohio River between 1907 and 1913.
- Teatro Nacional de El Salvador, the oldest theater in Central America, was inaugurated in San Salvador.
- The Pontifical Catholic University of Peru was founded in Lima.
- Born:
  - Robert Lowell, American poet, 6th United States Poet Laureate; in Boston, United States (d. 1977)
  - Tom Keating, English art restorer and art forger, credited for creating 2,000 forgeries from over 100 artists; as Thomas Patrick Keating, in Lewisham, London, England (d. 1984)
  - Ralph J. Gleason, American music critic, founding editor of Rolling Stone and co-founder of the Monterey Jazz Festival; as Ralph Joseph Gleason, in New York City, United States (d. 1975)
- Died: Antonina Miliukova, 68, Russian matriarch, wife to composer Pyotr Ilyich Tchaikovsky (b. 1848)

== March 2, 1917 (Friday) ==
- The enactment of the Jones–Shafroth Act granted Puerto Ricans U.S. citizenship.
- The Guilford Courthouse National Military Park was established near Greensboro, North Carolina.
- The New Birmingham Orchestra was established in Birmingham, England and ran until 1919 before it was dissolved and replaced by the City of Birmingham Symphony Orchestra.
- Born:
  - Desi Arnaz, Cuban-American actor, musician, and television producer, co-founder of Desilu Productions, husband to Lucille Ball; as Desiderio Alberto Arnaz y de Acha III, in Santiago de Cuba, Cuba (d. 1986)
  - Harriet Frank Jr., American screenwriter, known for her screenplay collaborations with her husband Irving Ravetch for director Martin Ritt for The Long, Hot Summer, Hud and Norma Rae; as Harriet Goldstein, in Portland, Oregon, United States (d. 2020)
  - Laurie Baker, British-born Indian architect, pioneered cost-effective energy-efficient architecture; as Lawrence Wilfred Baker, in Birmingham, England (d. 2007)
  - John Gardner, English composer, known for his prolific output from orchestral, such as Symphony No 1 in D Minor, Op.2, to Christmas carols including the adaptation of "Tomorrow Shall Be My Dancing Day"; in Manchester, England (d. 2011)
  - P. N. Oak, Indian historian, known for his theories that Christianity and Islam originated from Hinduism; as Purushottam Nagesh Oak, in Indore, British India (present-day India) (d. 2007)

== March 3, 1917 (Saturday) ==
- Some 20,000 workers were locked out at the Putilov Plant, the largest factory in Petrograd, following disputes with plant authorities on the denial of a pay increase. The workers then organized a general strike to protest.
- Toplica Uprising – Serbian Chetniks freed Prokuplje, Serbia.
- Zimmermann Telegram – Arthur Zimmermann, State Secretary of Foreign Affairs for the German Empire, said to an American journalist about the intercepted coded telegram, "I cannot deny it. It is true."
- British troopship Connaught was torpedoed and sunk in the English Channel by German submarine SM U-48 with the loss of three crew.
- John Ford debuted as a director with the film The Tornado, with himself starring in the lead role. The film is now considered lost.
- New York City Subway stations for the IRT White Plains Road Line, including Allerton Avenue, Bronx Park East, Burke Avenue, East 180th Street, Gun Hill Road, Nereid Avenue, Pelham Parkway, 219th Street, 225th Street, and 233rd Street were opened for service.
- Born:
  - Sameera Moussa, Egyptian physicist, creator of the "Atoms for Peace" movement; as Sameera Moussa Ali, in El Gharbia, Sultanate of Egypt (present-day Egypt) (d. 1952, killed in a car accident)
  - Carmen Rosales, Filipino actress, known for film including Arimunding-Munding, Lambingan, and MN; as Januaria Constantino Keller, in Rosales, Pangasinan, Philippine Islands (present-day Philippines) (d. 1991)
  - Dave P. Tyndall Jr., Irish business leader, known for his supermarket chains in Ireland, held the title in the Guinness World Records for oldest person to pilot a helicopter solo; as David Patrick Tyndall Jr., in Ireland (d. 2006)
  - David Fairbairn, Australian air force officer and politician, commander of the No. 79 Squadron during World War II, member of the Parliament of Australia for Farrer from 1949 to 1975; in Surrey, England (d. 1994)

== March 4, 1917 (Sunday) ==
- The Central Council of Ukraine was established in Kiev with Mykhailo Hrushevsky as parliament head.
- French forces under the command of Louis Franchet d'Espèrey launched a limited attack against the Germans on the Western Front when it was apparent the army was withdrawing. While the attack had some success, it failed to disrupt the organized withdrawal as French commander-in-chief Robert Nivelle held resources back for a planned spring offensive.
- The first American Dog Derby was held in Ashton, Idaho. Subsequent races have been held annually during the third week of February.
- Born: Clyde McCullough, American baseball player, catcher for the Chicago Cubs and Pittsburgh Pirates from 1940 to 1956; in Nashville, Tennessee, United States (d. 1982)

== March 5, 1917 (Monday) ==
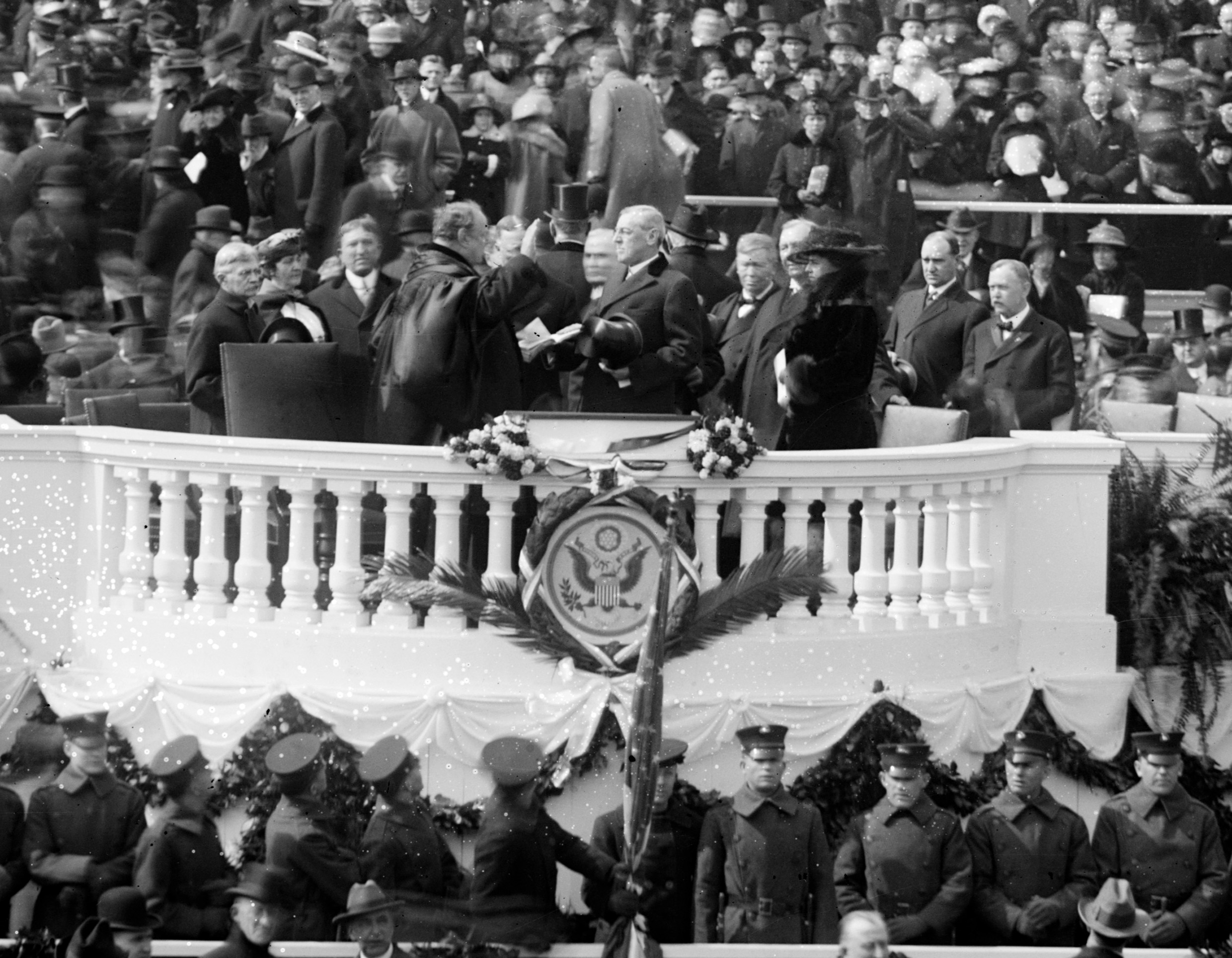
Woodrow Wilson is inaugurated for a second term as President of the United States.

- Woodrow Wilson was sworn in for a second term as President of the United States.
- Republican Jeannette Rankin of Montana became the first woman member of the United States House of Representatives.
- Toplica Uprising – Serbian Chetniks freed Blace, Serbia, and expanded the rebellion into the regions of West Morava and the Sokobanja and Svrljig areas.
- Mesopotamian campaign – A British force of 50,000 men under command of Lieutenant-General Stanley Maude began their march from Kut to Baghdad.
- Danish passenger ship Copenhagen was torpedoed and sunk in the North Sea by German submarine SM UC-61 with the loss of six lives.
- The 39 miles (62.8 km) of railroad from Izingolweni to Harding, South Africa was completed.
- Harry C. Wheeler, sheriff of Cochise County, Arizona, and his deputy were ambushed by Mexican bootleggers near the town of Gleeson, Arizona. Both lawmen traded gunfire with the gang, wounding one and forcing the rest to flee without their contraband alcohol. The gunfight was considered one of the last recorded Old West style gunfights.
- The comedy-drama The Poor Little Rich Girl, starring Mary Pickford and directed by Maurice Tourneur, was released. Screenwriter Frances Marion adapted it from the hit play by Eleanor Gates. The film was a box office success and became one of Pickford's trademark films. It is preserved by the National Film Registry and Library of Congress.
- Born:
  - István Fenyő, Hungarian mathematician, best known for his research into applied mathematics, author of On the theory of mean values; in Budapest, Austria-Hungary (present-day Hungary) (d. 1987)
  - Raymond P. Shafer, American politician, 39th Governor of Pennsylvania; as Raymond Philip Shafer, in New Castle, Pennsylvania, United States (d. 2006)
  - Mutsuo Toi, spree killer; in Okayama Prefecture, Empire of Japan (present-day Japan) (d. 1938)
- Died: Manuel de Arriaga, 76, Portuguese state leader, 1st President of Portugal (b. 1840)

== March 6, 1917 (Tuesday) ==
- British cargo ship Caldergrove was torpedoed and sunk in the Atlantic Ocean by German submarine SM U-44 with the loss of 19 crew.
- The Polish Executive Committee in Ruthenia, the Polish representative governing body in Ukraine, was established in Kiev.
- Born:
  - Samael Aun Weor, Colombian religious leader, founder of the Universal Christian Gnostic Movement; as Víctor Manuel Gómez Rodríguez, in Bogotá, Colombia (d. 1977)
  - Donald Davidson, American philosopher, leading expert of philosophy of language and philosophy of action including the slingshot argument; in Springfield, Massachusetts, United States (d. 2003)
  - Will Eisner, American comic book artist, creator of the Spirit, author of the graphic novel A Contract with God; as William Erwin Eisner, in New York City, United States (d. 2005)
  - Frankie Howerd, British comedian, known for comedic roles such as the British TV series Up Pompeii!; as Francis Alick Howard, in York, England (d. 1992)
- Died:
  - Jules Vandenpeereboom, 73, Belgian state leader, 17th Prime Minister of Belgium (b. 1843)
  - Valdemar Psilander, 32, Danish actor, best known for his film roles including the Danish version of The Picture of Dorian Gray, A Victim of the Mormons and The Secret of the Desert (b. 1884)
  - Cecil Brown, 66, Hawaiian politician, member of the Legislature of the Hawaiian Kingdom from 1876 to 1892 and Senator for the Territory of Hawaii from 1895 to 1913 (b. 1850)

== March 7, 1917 (Wednesday) ==
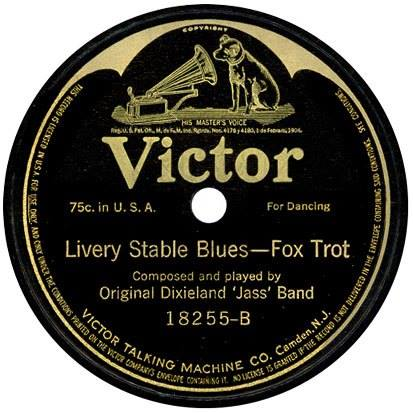
"Livery Stable Blues", the first commercial recording of jazz music released.

- British Prime Minister David Lloyd George announced that the United Kingdom was ready to confer self-government to the parts of Ireland that wanted it, adding the northeastern part (now Northern Ireland) would not be "coerced".
- The strike at the Putilov Plant expanded to 100,000 protesters in Petrograd.
- The Romanian Volunteer Corps in Russia was established using Romanian prisoners of war ordered to fight against Romania and would be involved in the battles of Mărăști and Mărășești.
- "Livery Stable Blues", by the Original Dixieland Jass Band, became the first jazz recording commercially released.
- Born:
  - Janet Collins, American ballet choreographer, pioneered ballet for African American dancers; in New Orleans, United States (d. 2003)
  - Ted W. Lawson, American air force officer, member of the Doolittle Raid and author of Thirty Seconds Over Tokyo, recipient of the Distinguished Flying Cross; as Ted William Lawson, in Fresno, California, United States (d. 1992)
  - Reginald Maudling, British politician, held several cabinet posts for the Winston Churchill, Edward Heath and Harold Macmillan administrations; in London, England (d. 1979)

== March 8, 1917 (Thursday) ==
- Fall of Baghdad – British forces reached the Diyala River 35 kilometers south of the city.
- February Revolution – Train delays delivering bread and flour to Petrograd due to weather and war conditions exasperated existing protests surrounding a strike at the Putilov Plant. Most of the 50,000 protesters for the bread and flour shortages were women who had gathered to celebrate International Women's Day.
- Scores of Romanian prisoners of war volunteered for Romanian Volunteer Corps in Russia to fight against the Central Powers.
- The United States Senate adopted the cloture rule in order to limit filibusters at the urging of U.S. President Woodrow Wilson, after a group of 12 anti-war senators managed to kill a bill that would have allowed Wilson to arm merchant vessels in the face of unrestricted German submarine warfare.
- British collier ship Storstad was sunk in the Atlantic Ocean by German submarine SM U-62 with the loss of three crew.
- The P. G. Wodehouse short story collection The Man with Two Left Feet was published in the United Kingdom by Methuen Publishing.
- Born: Leslie Fiedler, American literary critic, author of Love and Death in the American Novel; in Newark, New Jersey, United States (d. 2003)
- Died: Ferdinand von Zeppelin, 78, German inventor, developer of the famous Zeppelin airship (b. 1838)

== March 9, 1917 (Friday) ==
- February Revolution – Protests in Petrograd calling all for the end of the Russian autocracy grew to an estimated 200,000 to 500,000 people, bring all industrial activity in the city to a standstill by the following day.
- The Special Transcaucasian Committee was established by the authority of Grand Duke Nikolai Nikolaevich for all military and civil matters related to Transcaucasia region.
- Fall of Baghdad – Ottoman forces held off an initial attack by the British on Diyala River, causing command to shift most of its forces north of the city. Ottoman forces shifted in kind leaving a single regiment to defend the river banks.
- The Hell Gate Bridge in New York City was officially opened.
- Born:
  - Rafael Celestino Benítez, Puerto Rican-American naval officer, commander of the submarine USS Cochino during World War II, recipient of the Bronze Star Medal and two Silver Stars, vice-president of the Latin America regions for the Pan Am Airline; in Juncos, Puerto Rico (d. 1999)
  - Zuzanna Ginczanka, Polish poet, author of the poetry collection About the Centaurs, in Warsaw (d. 1945, executed); Algirdas Julien Greimas, Lithuanian-French linguist, developer of the semiotic square; as Zuzanna Polina Ginzburg, in Kyiv, Russian Empire (present-day Ukraine) (d. 1992)

== March 10, 1917 (Saturday) ==
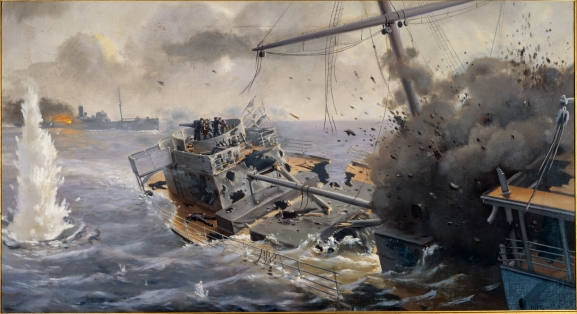
New Zealand ship Otaki sinks after fired upon by German cruiser SMS Möwe.

- February Revolution – Tsar Nicholas wired Sergey Semyonovich Khabalov, commander of all military forces in Petrograd, to use rifle fire and other means to suppress rioting. Meanwhile, Mikhail Rodzianko, Chairman of the State Duma) (Russian Parliament), called on the chairman of the Council of Ministers Nikolai Golitsyn to resign, only later to have Foreign Affairs Minister Nikolai Pokrovsky propose the resignation of the whole government.
- Fall of Baghdad – The Ottoman regiment on the Diyala River was defeated, leaving the southern edge of Baghdad undefended. All Ottoman forces were forced to withdraw into the city.
- German merchant raider ship SMS Möwe exchanged fire and sank armed New Zealand merchant ship SS Otaki in the Atlantic Ocean but was damaged as well. The German ship took over 200 prisoners from both Otaki and another ship it had scuttled earlier, as well as killing five sailors, but lost five crew and another 10 wounded.
- British submarine HMS G13 torpedoed and sank German U-boat SM UC-43 in the North Sea with the loss of all 26 crew.
- The Royal Navy destroyer Taurus was launched by John I. Thornycroft & Company in Southampton, England and would serve with the Harwich Force for the rest of World War I.
- 1917 Franco-Russian agreement confirmed but would be negated by the fall of both signatory governments within days.
- Born:
  - Zbigniew Ścibor-Rylski, Polish air force officer, member of the Polish resistance movement in World War II, recipient of the Cross of Valour and Virtuti Militari for service with the Polish Army; in Brovki-Pershi, Russian Empire (present-day Ukraine) (d. 2018)
  - William George Wilson, American cinematographer, pioneer of sports cinematography; in Phoenixville, Pennsylvania, United States (d. 2007)

== March 11, 1917 (Sunday) ==
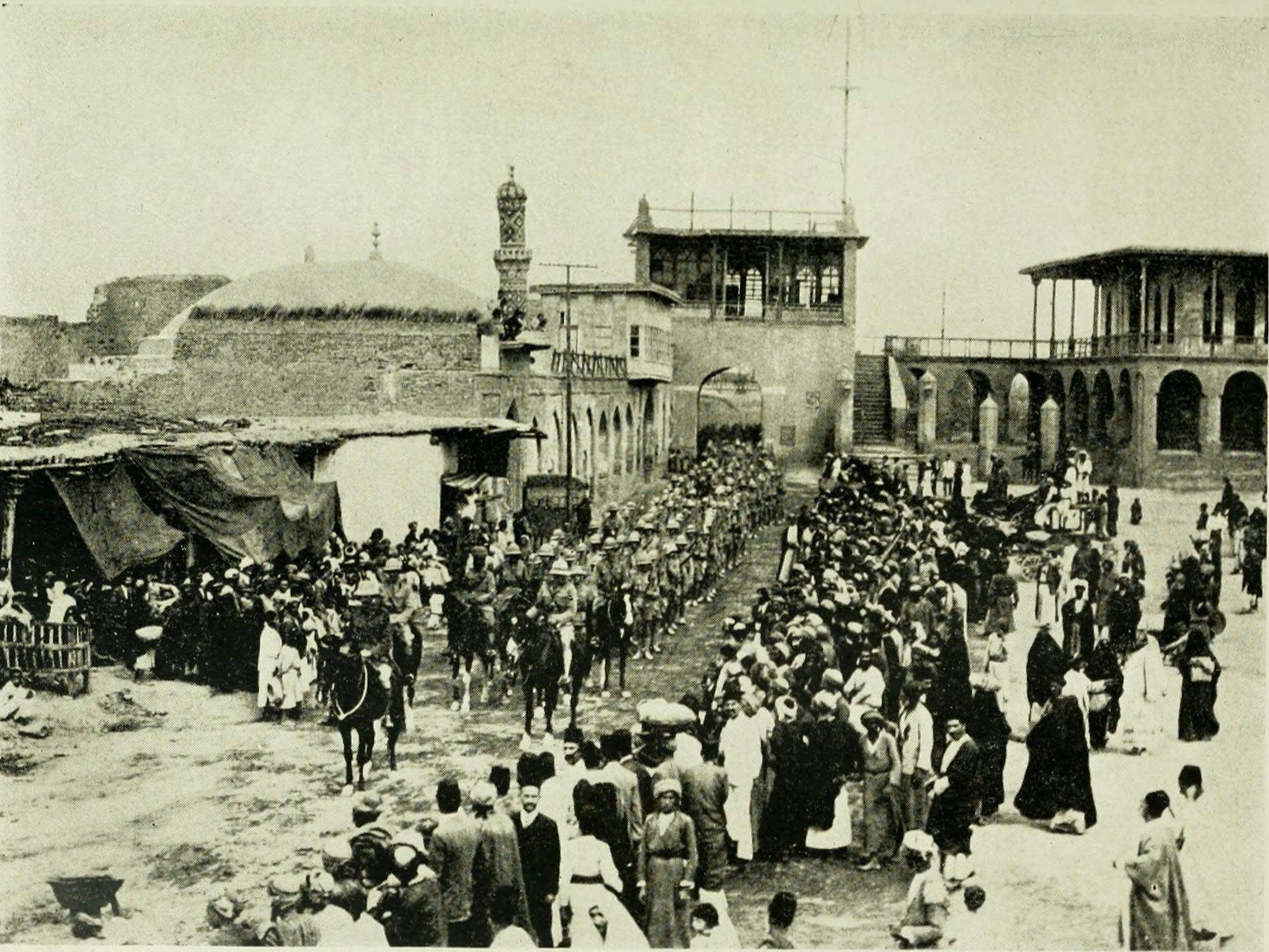
British troops enter Baghdad.

- Fall of Baghdad – Ottoman forces evacuated Baghdad, allowing the British to enter and occupy the city with little to no fighting. Some 9,000 Ottoman soldiers were captured.
- With no formal opposition against him, Venustiano Carranza was elected by concession to become the 37th President of Mexico.
- February Revolution – General Nikolai Ivanov was promoted to command the military forces in Petrograd, but already many soldiers with the Pavlovsky Regiment garrison in the city had mutinied following an incident where police shot into a crowd and killed 200 protesters. The mutinies spread and frustrated the general's chances with Minister of Interior Alexander Protopopov to suppress the unrest.
- Born:
  - Thomas Burton Adams Jr., American politician, 10th Lieutenant Governor of Florida, 15th Secretary of State of Florida; in Jacksonville, Florida, United States (d. 2006)
  - Robert L. Carter, American judge, presided the United States District Court for the Southern District of New York from 1972 to 2012; as Robert Lee Carter, in Caryville, Florida, United States (d. 2012)
- Died:
  - William Henry Hosking, 75, British-New Zealand physician, produced the first X-rays in New Zealand (b. 1841)
  - Yitzchok Friedman, 66-67, Jewish religious leader, first Rebbe of the Boyan Hasidic dynasty (b. 1850)
  - Jack Reynolds, 48, English football player, forward for many clubs including Aston Villa from 1886 to 1905, as well as both the Ireland and England national football teams (b. 1869)

== March 12, 1917 (Monday) ==
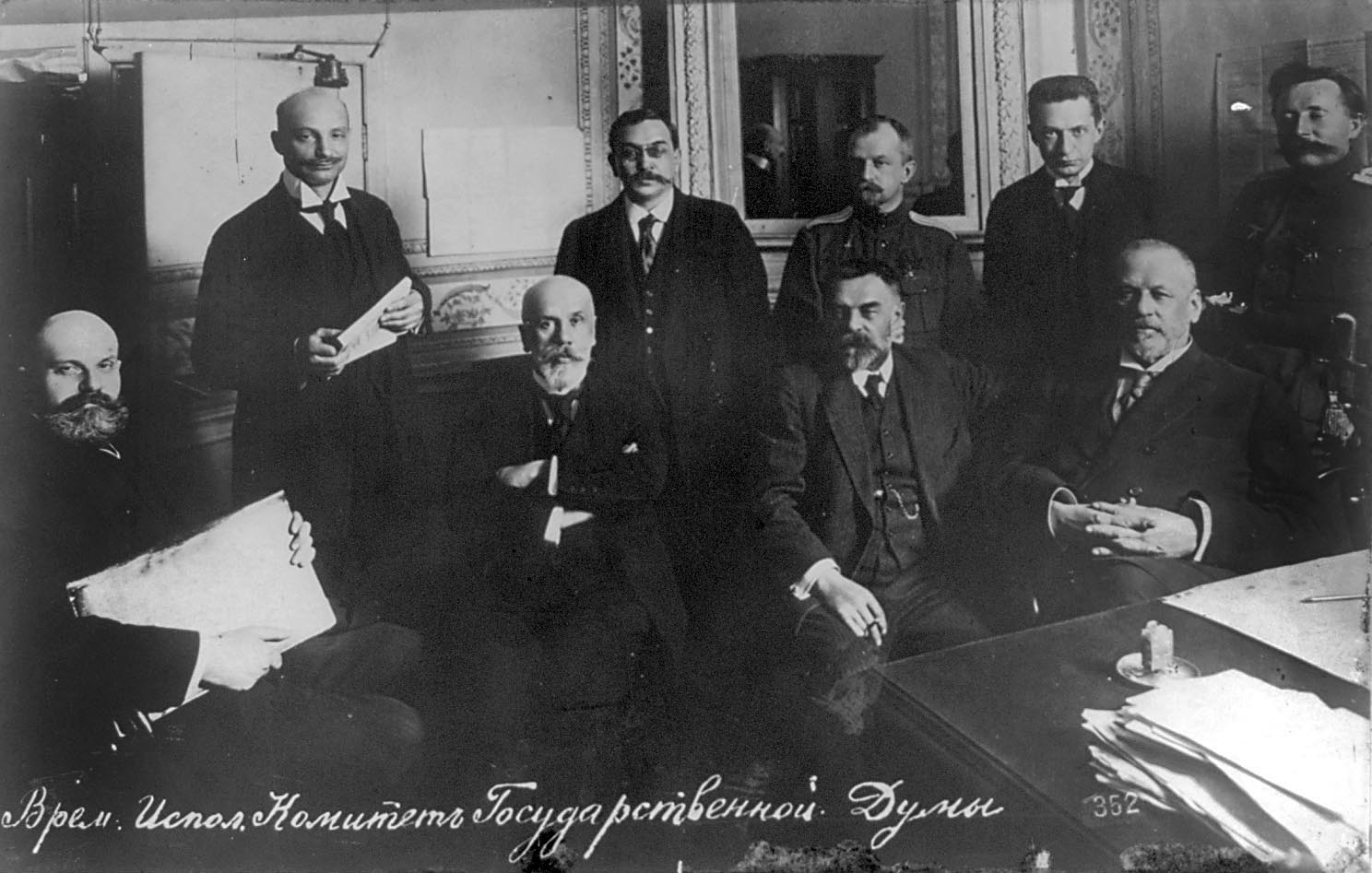
The interim committee of the Russian State Duma during the February Revolution.

- Battle of Monastir – A French force of five divisions under command of Maurice Sarrail attacked Bulgarian and German positions north and west of the city of Monastir, Serbia that the Allies had captured in December to ensure the city did not fall back into the hands of the Central Powers.
- Toplica Uprising – Combined Bulgarian and Austro-Hungarian forces counterattacked the Serbian Chetniks in efforts to quell the rebellion.
- February Revolution – Mikhail Rodzianko and others formed the Provisional Committee of the State Duma as the official government of Russia but were contested by the formation of the Petrograd Soviet. Meanwhile, the Council of Ministers of Russia met for the last time where Minister of Interior Alexander Protopopov and the rest agreed to dissolve the government. Rodzianko sent a telegram to Tsar Nicholas to notify him that the government was dissolving. Most of the remaining authorities retreated to safety to the Winter Palace as Petrograd went firmly into control of the revolutionaries.
- British submarine HMS E49 struck a mine and sank off Shetland with the loss of all 30 crew.
- Royal Navy destroyer HMS Skate was torpedoed and damaged in the North Sea by German submarine SM UC-69 with the loss of a crew member. She was repaired and returned to service.
- Born:
  - Leonard Chess, Polish-American music executive, co-founder of Chess Records; as Lejzor Szmuel Czyż, in Motal, Poland (present-day Belarus) (d. 1969)
  - Googie Withers, British actress, best known with her collaborations with husband and actor John McCallum; as Georgette Lizette Withers, in Karachi, British India (present-day Pakistan) (d. 2011)

== March 13, 1917 (Tuesday) ==
- Samarra offensive – A British force of 45,000 men under command of Stanley Maude launched an offensive to capture the 130 km (81 mi) railroad running north from Baghdad to Samarra to ensure Ottoman forces could not regroup and threaten British occupation of central Mesopotamia (now Iraq).
- February Revolution – The bulk of the Petrograd garrison mutinied, with 60,000 soldiers joining the revolutionaries and dispersing 40,000 rifles to street militias. Meanwhile, Minister of Interior Alexander Protopopov surrendered to revolutionaries at Tauride Palace.
- The British ended their raids on German-held territory around the Ancre Valley in France.
- British and German colonial forces clashed at Nambanje in German East Africa. The British were driven back and suffered 18 casualties.
- German submarine SM UC-68 accidentally struck one of her own mines and sunk off the coast of England with the loss of all 26 crew.
- The United States Army established the 6th Aero Squadron in Hawaii, with three Curtiss seaplanes in service.
- Al-Zaura, an official Baghdad newspaper for the Ottoman Empire in Mesopotamia, released its last edition before British authorities shut it down.
- Born: Robert Mark, English law enforcer, 19th London Police Commissioner; in Chorlton-cum-Hardy, Manchester, England (d. 2010)

== March 14, 1917 (Wednesday) ==
- The Republic of China terminated diplomatic relations with Germany.
- Toplica Uprising – Bulgarian forces wrested control of Prokuplje, Serbia back from the Serbian Chetniks.
- Battle of Monastir – French troops assaulted Hill 1248 held by Bulgarian forces north of Monastir, Serbia that was being used for artillery barrages.
- British ocean liner Orsova struck a mine and was damaged in the Atlantic Ocean with the loss of eight lives. She was beached off the coast of England but was later refloated.
- Born: Richard Rose, American philosopher, noted thinker on esotericism and investigator in paranormal phenomena; in Benwood, West Virginia, United States (d. 2005)
- Died:
  - Zenas Ferry Moody, 84, American politician, 7th Governor of Oregon (b. 1832)
  - Fernand Labori, 56, French lawyer, noted defender for Alfred Dreyfus (b. 1860)

== March 15, 1917 (Thursday) ==
- February Revolution – Tsar Nicholas abdicated his throne and his son's claims, sending in motion the end of the Russian Empire after 196 years.
- The 4th Infantry Brigade of New Zealand was established.
- The Ho Hong Bank was formally registered as a financial institution in Malaysia, and would provide services until 1932.

== March 16, 1917 (Friday) ==
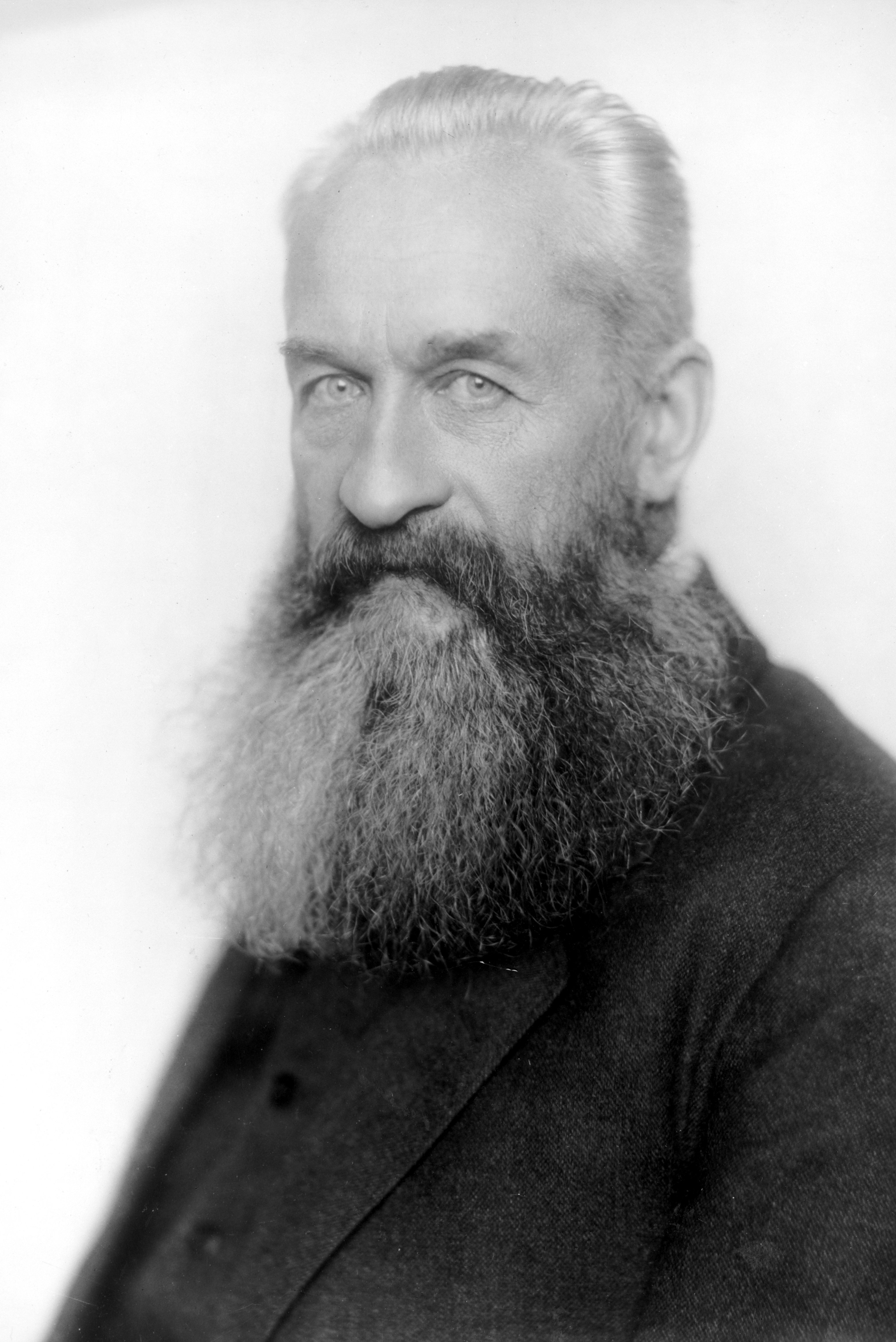
Prince Georgy Lvov, head of the Russian Provisional Government

- February Revolution – Grand Duke Michael Alexandrovich refused the throne of the Russian Empire, allowing power to be passed to the newly formed Russian Provisional Government under Prince Georgy Lvov. The Duma formally announced the new Russian Provisional Government to the public in the Russian daily newspaper Izvestia.
- German forces began an organized retreat 40 kilometres (25 mi) back to the proposed Hindenburg Line, which gave up more territory to the Allies than all its military operations could from 1914 to early 1917 but allowed better defense against future offensives.
- Toplica Uprising – Austro-Hungarian forces drove the Serbian Chetniks out of Kuršumlija, Serbia.
- British cruiser HMS Achilles and armed merchant ship SS Dundee sank German cruiser SMS Leopard with all 319 crew killed. British casualties included six boarding party members.
- Germany began Operation Türkenkreuz ("Turk's Cross"), a heavier-than-air bombing campaign against England.
- Royal Naval Air Service launched the first night bombings using Handley bombers to destroy naval bases, railways, and industrial targets in Germany.
- Died: John Studebaker, 83, American industrialist, co-founder of the Studebaker automobile company (b. 1833)

== March 17, 1917 (Saturday) ==
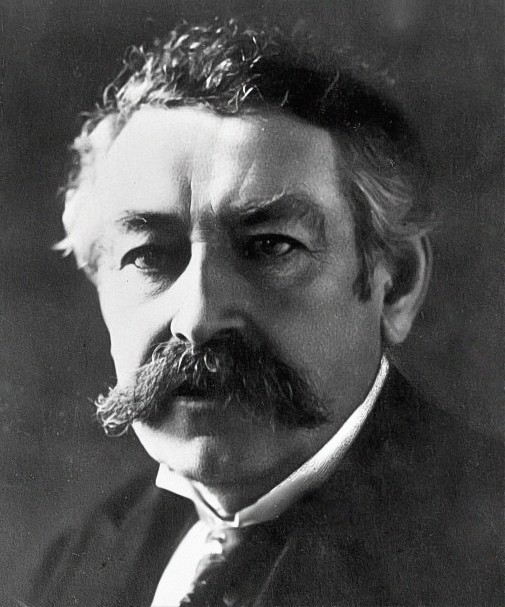
French Prime Minister Aristide Briand resigns.

- Aristide Briand resigned as Prime Minister of France and was replaced by Alexandre Ribot, making it the fourth and final time the French leader held the position.
- An Imperial German Navy squadron raided the British ports of Ramsgate and Margate, where in the ensuring battle with the Royal Navy, managed to torpedo and sink Royal Navy destroyer HMS Paragon before withdrawing.
- The Australian 6th Division was established, with units including the 16th, 17th and 18th Brigades. However, it was broken up in September before it formally saw actions and troops enlisted were redistributed into other units.
- British passenger ship Antony was torpedoed and sunk in the Irish Sea by German submarine SM UC-48 with the loss of 55 lives.
- Bir Hakeim rescue: Major Hugh Grosvenor, 2nd Duke of Westminster, led a force to rescue 92 British prisoners of war from Bir Hakeim in Italian Cyrenaica (modern-day Libya), killing the Senusiyya guards and their families.
- The sorority Delta Phi Epsilon was established at New York University School of Law.
- The Gaelic football club Dorsey Emmet was established in Dorsey, County Armagh, Ireland.
- Lea County, New Mexico, was incorporated, with its county seat in Lovington, New Mexico.
- Born:
  - Brian Boydell, Irish composer, known for compositions In Memoriam Mahatma Gandhi and String Quartet, op. 31; in Howth, Ireland (d. 2000)
  - Bernard Barker, Cuban-American intelligence officer, member of the Watergate burglaries; in Havana, Cuba (d. 2009)
  - Hans Philipp, German air force officer, commander of the Jagdgeschwader 1 and 54 squadrons for the Luftwaffe during World War II, recipient of the Knight's Cross of the Iron Cross; in Meissen, Kingdom of Saxony, German Empire (present-day Saxony, Germany) (d. 1943, killed in action)
- Died:
  - Franz Brentano, 79, German philosopher and psychologist, developed the concept of intentionality (b. 1838)
  - Hippolyte Blanc, 72, Scottish architect, best known for his churches in Scotland including the Mayfield Free Church (now Mayfield Salisbury Church) in Edinburgh (b. 1844)

== March 18, 1917 (Sunday) ==
- Battle of Monastir – French troops temporarily captured Hill 1248 and 1,200 Bulgarian prisoners.
- Royal Navy minesweeper PS Duchess of Montrose struck a mine and sank in the North Sea with the loss of 12 of her crew.
- German submarine SM UB-6 was scuttled after running aground at the mouth of the Maas (Meuse) in the Netherlands.
- The first edition of the daily newspaper Excélsior was distributed in Mexico City, making it the second-oldest Mexican paper after El Universal.
- The last edition of the Russian daily newspaper Russkoye Znamya was released, after which it was shut down by the Petrograd Soviet.
- Solidarity, a labor newspaper published by the Industrial Workers of the World, released its last edition, after which it was replaced by the Defense News Bulletin (which folded the following year).
- Born:
  - Riccardo Brengola, Italian violinist, considered one of the top Italian violinists in the 20th century for solo and collaboration work with conductors Carlo Maria Giulini and Igor Markevitch; in Naples, Kingdom of Italy (present-day Italy) (d. 2004)
  - Nan Huai-Chin, Chinese philosopher, major leader in the revival of Chinese Buddhism; in Wenzhou, Republic of China (present-day China) (d. 2012)
- Died: Károly Ferenczy, 55, Hungarian painter, known for such works as The Three Magi and Orpheus (b. 1862)

== March 19, 1917 (Monday) ==
- Lieutenant-General Stanley Maude, commander of British forces in newly occupied Baghdad, issued a proclamation to assure the city population that "Our armies do not come into your cities and lands as conquerors or enemies, but as liberators."
- Samarra offensive – British forces captured Fallujah.
- French battleship Danton was torpedoed and sunk in the Mediterranean Sea by German submarine SM U-64 with the loss of 296 of her 1,102 crew.
- The United States Supreme Court upheld the eight-hour workday for railroads.
- American fighter pilot James Rogers McConnell was shot down and killed while engaging two German planes over France. He was the last member of the Lafayette Escadrille to be killed in action prior to the United States entering World War I.
- The Ansaldo aircraft took flight.
- The comic opera Eileen, written by Victor Herbert and Henry Blossom, opened at the Shubert Theatre in New York City. It ran for 64 shows before going on tour. A fire destroyed the sets and costumes three months into the tour and the show wasn't revived until 1982.
- Born:
  - Dinu Lipatti, Romanian pianist, best known for live and recorded performances of Chopin; as Constantin Lipatti, in Bucharest, Kingdom of Romania (present-day Romania) (d. 1950)
  - Michael Bialoguski, Polish-Australian intelligence officer, participant in the 1954 Petrov Affair; in Kiev, Russian Empire (present-day Kyiv, Ukraine) (d. 1984)
  - Payton Jordan, American athletics trainer, coach of the 1968 U.S. Olympic track and field team which won a record total of 24 medals including 12 gold; in Whittier, California, United States (d. 2009)

== March 20, 1917 (Tuesday) ==
- Germany completed its withdrawal to the Hindenburg Line, which was 40–45 kilometres (25–28 mi) shorter than the previous one and could be defended with fewer units, freeing up 13 or 14 divisions for action on the Eastern Front.
- British hospital ship HMHS Asturias was damaged in the English Channel by German submarine SM UC-66 with the loss of 35 lives. She was beached and later salvaged.
- A motion to reduce the salary of the British Prime Minister by £100 was introduced in the House of Commons as a protest against the refusal to publish the proceedings of the courts-martial for participants in the Easter Rising that occurred last year in Dublin.
- Lieutenant Frank McNamara became the first, and only, Australian airman to receive the Victoria Cross during World War I.
- Japanese research institute Riken was established as a private foundation with Kikuchi Dairoku as the first director.
- Born:
  - Vera Lynn, English actress and singer, popular performer for Entertainments National Service Association during World War II with wartime hits "We'll Meet Again", "The White Cliffs of Dover", "A Nightingale Sang in Berkeley Square" and "There'll Always Be an England"; as Vera Margaret Welch, in East Ham, London, England (d. 2020)
  - Haddon Donald, New Zealand army officer and politician, commander of the 22nd Battalion during World War II, recipient of the Military Cross, Legion of Merit, and Distinguished Service Order, Member of New Zealand Parliament from 1963 to 1969; in Masterton, New Zealand (d. 2018)
  - Chaim Goldberg, Polish Jewish artist, known for works of pre-war daily Jewish life, survivor of The Holocaust; in Kazimierz Dolny, Poland (d. 2004)
  - Yigael Yadin, Israeli politician, 2nd Chief of the General of the Israel Defense Forces; as Yigael Sukenik, in Jerusalem, Ottoman Empire (present-day Israel) (d. 1984)

== March 21, 1917 (Wednesday) ==
- The United Kingdom formed an Imperial War Cabinet to coordinate all military action in the British Empire during World War I.
- Norwegian ship Najade was torpedoed and sunk in the Atlantic Ocean by German submarine SM U-59 with the loss of all 21 crew on board.
- Born:
  - Michael S. Davison, American army officer, commander of the Cambodian campaign during the Vietnam War; as Michael Shannon Davison, in San Francisco, United States (d. 2006)
  - Frank Hardy, Australian writer, author of Power Without Glory; as Francis Joseph Hardy, in Southern Cross, Victoria, Australia (d. 1994)
  - Anton Coppola, American conductor and composer, known for his collaborations with the New York City Opera and founder of Opera Tampa, uncle to Francis Ford Coppola and Talia Shire; as Antonio Francesco Coppola, in New York City, United States (d. 2020)
- Died: Alfred Einhorn, 61, German chemist, creator of procaine, known popularly by the brand Novocaine (b. 1856)

== March 22, 1917 (Thursday) ==
- The American Protective League was established to allow private citizens to report to U.S. federal enforcement agencies any suspicions of espionage during World War I, growing to 250,000 members in 600 cities.
- The borough Beachwood, New Jersey, was incorporated.
- Born: Virginia Grey, American actress, starred in over 100 films starting with the silent version of Uncle Tom's Cabin to Madame X; in Edendale, Los Angeles, California, United States (d. 2004)
- Died: Edward William Cornelius Humphrey, 72, American theologian, leading proponent of modernizing Presbyterianism in United States (b. 1844)

== March 23, 1917 (Friday) ==
- Royal Navy destroyer HMS Laforey struck a mine and sank in the English Channel with the loss of 59 of her 77 crew.
- A tornado struck New Albany, Indiana, killing 46 people and injuring 250 more. Over 300 homes were destroyed along with two schools and a factory. Another tornado struck Flat Rock, Illinois, damaging 40 farms and causing one fatality.
- The Nevada Department of Transportation was established in Carson City, Nevada.
- Born:
  - Kenneth Tobey, American actor, best known for lead roles in 1950s sci-fi thrillers including The Thing from Another World and It Came from Beneath the Sea; as Jesse Kenneth Tobey, in Oakland, California, United States (d. 2002)
  - Oscar Shumsky, Russian American violinist and conductor, considered one of the greatest American violinists with noted recordings on Bach, Beethoven and Mozart; in Philadelphia, United States (d. 2000)

== March 24, 1917 (Saturday) ==
- William Holman of the Nationalist Party beat Labor Party leader John Storey in the New South Wales state election. Holman was elected with 47 of the vote to become the 19th Premier of New South Wales.
- Born:
  - Constantine Andreou, Brazilian-born Greek artist, recipient of the Ordre des Arts et des Lettres and Legion of Honour; in São Paulo, Brazil (d. 2007)
  - John Kendrew, British molecular biologist, recipient of the Nobel Prize in Chemistry for research into heme-containing proteins; in Oxford, England (d. 1997)

== March 25, 1917 (Sunday) ==
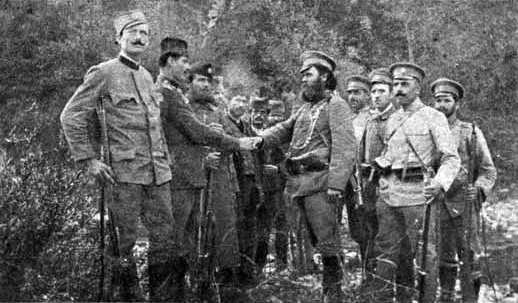
Chetnik commanders surrendering to Bulgarian commander Tane Nikolov.

- Toplica Uprising – The Central Powers regained full control of Serbia from the Chetniks, ending the rebellion.
- The Georgian Orthodox Church restored the autocephaly abolished by the Russian Empire in 1811.
- The sorority Sigma Delta Tau was established at Cornell University with all Jewish members, although from the start it was an inclusive sorority. It now has over 100 chapters and 60,000 initiates.
- Swedish football governing bodies Blekinge Fotbollförbund, Bohusläns Fotbollförbund, and Södermanlands Fotbollförbund were established to manage regional league clubs for the Swedish Football Association.
- Born: Barbara Jefferis, Australian writer, author of Undercurrent and Time of the Unicorn; in Adelaide, South Australia (d. 2004)
- Died: Alexander S. Williams, 77, Canadian-American law enforcer, police inspector for the New York City Police Department during the 1870s and 1880s (b. 1839)

== March 26, 1917 (Monday) ==
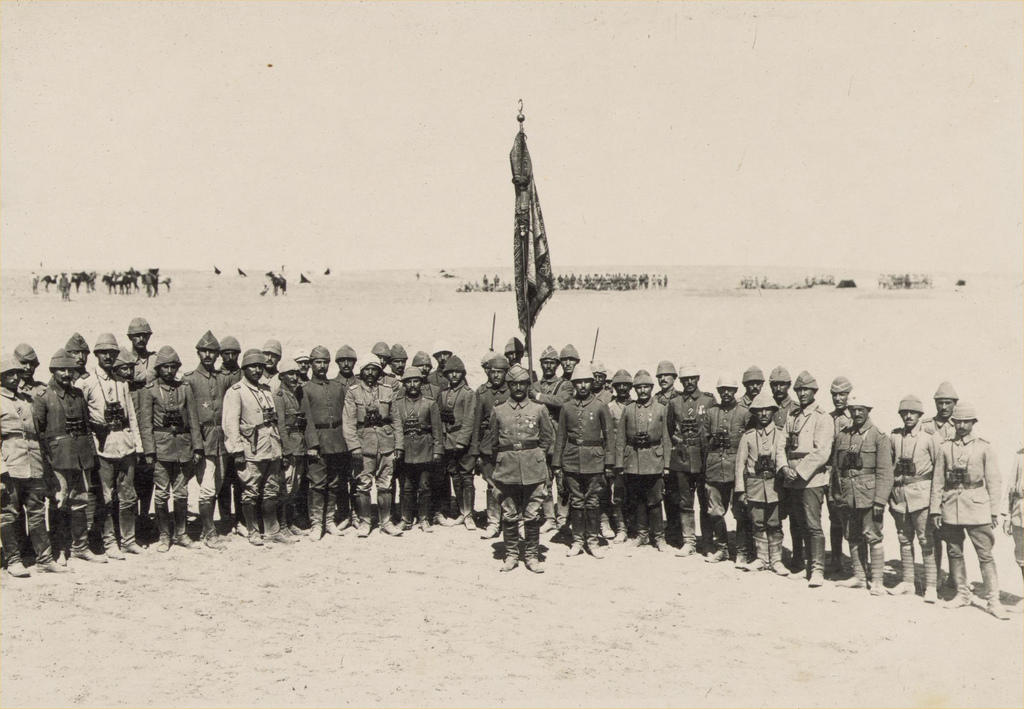
Ottoman officers oveseeing the defence of Gaza City under siege by the British.

- First Battle of Gaza – The Egyptian Expeditionary Force encircled the Gaza garrison but were then ordered to withdraw, leaving the city to the Ottoman defenders. British casualties included 523 killed, 2,932 wounded and 512 missing. Ottoman casualties were 300 dead, 750 wounded and 600 missing.
- The Seattle Metropolitans defeated the Montreal Canadiens in the Stanley Cup Final by three games to one.
- Chulalongkorn University was established in Bangkok, the oldest post-secondary institution in Thailand.
- The Imperial War Museum was established by the British Imperial War Cabinet.
- The boroughs of Keansburg and Teterboro, New Jersey, were incorporated.
- Born:
  - Rufus Thomas, American R&B musician, best known for his novelty dance records "Walking the Dog", "Do the Funky Chicken", and "(Do the) Push and Pull"; in Cayce, Mississippi, United States (d. 2001)
  - Ruth Gilbert, New Zealand poet, known for poem collections including Selected Poems, recipient of the New Zealand Order of Merit; in Greytown, New Zealand (d. 2016)

== March 27, 1917 (Tuesday) ==
- The No. 4 Squadron of the Australian Flying Corps was re-designated the No. 71 Squadron to avoid confusion with the existing No. 4 Squadron of the Royal Flying Corps.
- The comic opera La rondine by Giacomo Puccini premiered at the Opéra de Monte-Carlo.
- The Argentine sports club Obras Sanitarias was established in Núñez, Buenos Aires as a rugby club, but later became better known for its basketball team.
- The borough Barrington, New Jersey, was incorporated.
- Born:
  - Cyrus Vance, American politician, 57th United States Secretary of State; in Clarksburg, West Virginia, United States (d. 2002)
  - Harry West, Irish politician, leader of the Ulster Unionist Party from 1974 to 1979, member of Parliament of Northern Ireland from 1954 to 1974; as Henry William West, in Enniskillen, Ireland (d. 2004)
- Died:
  - Moses Jacob Ezekiel, 72, American sculptor, best known for his sculptures including Anthony J. Drexel, Homer and the Confederate Memorial in Arlington National Cemetery (b. 1844)
  - Joseph Braithwaite, 69, British-New Zealand politician, 30th Mayor of Dunedin (b. 1848)
  - Percy Cherry, 21, Australian army officer, recipient of the Victoria Cross; killed in action at Lagnicourt, France (b. 1895)

== March 28, 1917 (Wednesday) ==
- The British Women's Army Auxiliary Corps was established.
- Died: Albert Pinkham Ryder, 70, American painter, known for works including Siegfried and the Rhine Maidens and The Race Track (Death on a Pale Horse) (b. 1847)

== March 29, 1917 (Thursday) ==
- Zimmermann Telegram – Arthur Zimmermann, State Secretary of Foreign Affairs for the German Empire, publicly admitted in the Reichstag (German Parliament) that the telegram was genuine and it was the intention of Germany to propose a military alliance with Mexico against the United States.
- The United States Army formed the 7th Aero Squadron for service in the Panama Canal Zone.
- The Broadway musical Leave It to Jane premiered at the Longacre Theatre in New York City, with music by Jerome Kern and book and lyrics by Guy Bolton and P. G. Wodehouse, and based on the 1904 play The College Widow by George Ade.
- Stockholms Fotbollförbund was added to the growing association football governing bodies established within the Swedish Football Association.
- Born: Man o' War, champion thoroughbred racehorse, considered the greatest racehorse of all time with 20 wins including two Triple Crowns; in Lexington, Kentucky, United States (d. 1947)
- Died: Edvin Bergroth, 80, Finnish engineer, manager of the Hietalahti shipyard and Engineering Works and chairman of Tampella (b. 1836)

== March 30, 1917 (Friday) ==
- Hjalmar Hammarskjöld stepped down as Prime Minister of Sweden and was replaced by the right-wing businessman and politician Carl Swartz.
- The National Moldavian Party was formed following a four-day meeting organized by nationalist leader Vasile Stroescu among the political elite of Bessarabia in Eastern Europe.
- Born: Herbert Anderson, American actor, best known as Henry Mitchell in the 1959 television sitcom Dennis the Menace; in Oakland, California, United States (d. 1994)

== March 31, 1917 (Saturday) ==
- The United States took possession of the Danish West Indies after paying $25 million to Denmark, becoming the Virgin Islands.
- British hospital ship HMHS Gloucester Castle was torpedoed and damaged in the English Channel off the Isle of Wight by German submarine SM UB-32 with the loss of three crew. She was subsequently repaired and returned to service.
- Died:
  - Emil von Behring, 63, German chemist, recipient of the Nobel Prize in Physiology or Medicine for discovering an antitoxin for diphtheria (b. 1854)
  - James Fynn, 23, British soldier, recipient of the Victoria Cross; killed in action during the Mesopotamian campaign (b. 1893)
