= Flood Control Act of 1928 =

US federal law

- Long title: An Act For the control of floods on the Mississippi River and its tributaries, and for other purposes
- Nicknames: Jones-Reid Act
- Enacted by: the 70th United States Congress

Citations
- Public law: Pub. L. 70–391
- Statutes at Large: 45 Stat. 534

Codification
- Acts amended: Flood Control Act of 1917
- Titles amended: 33

Legislative history
- Introduced in the House as H.R. 8219 by Frank R. Reid; Committee consideration by House Flood Control; Passed the House on; Passed the Senate on; Signed into law by President Calvin Coolidge on May 15, 1928

Major amendments
- Flood Control Act of 1936

The Flood Control Act of 1928 (FCA 1928) (70th United States Congress, Sess. 1. Ch. 569, enacted May 15, 1928) authorized the United States Army Corps of Engineers to design and construct projects for the control of floods on the Mississippi River and its tributaries as well as the Sacramento River in California. It was sponsored by Senator Wesley L. Jones (R) of Washington and Representative Frank R. Reid (R) of Illinois, in response to the Great Mississippi Flood of 1927.

== Significance ==
FCA 1928 had three important effects. It increased public awareness of advances in flood control theory and practice. It put flood control on par with other major projects of its time with the largest public works appropriation ever authorized. And, FCA 1928 increased debate on local contributions to a new level.

== Section 1: Mississippi River Valley project ==
Authorized the project for the flood control of the Mississippi River in its alluvial valley and for its improvement from Head of Passes to Cape Girardeau, Missouri, in accordance with the engineering plan set forth and recommended in the report submitted by the Chief of Engineers of the U.S. Army Corps of Engineers.

Created a board consisting of the Chief of Engineers, the president of the Mississippi River Commission, and a civil engineer chosen from civil life appointed by the President of the United States. The board was to consider the engineering differences between the project adopted by the Act (the Chief of Engineers' plans) and plans recommended by the Mississippi River Commission. The project and the changes therein are to be executed in accordance with section 8 of the Act.

Directed surveys to be made between Baton Rouge, Louisiana, and Cape Girardeau, Missouri to ascertain and determine the best method of securing flood relief in addition to levees. These surveys were to be made before any flood-control works other than levees and revetments are undertaken on that portion of the river.

Directed the character of diversion works and outlets. They are to be built in a manner and of a character which will fully and amply protect the adjacent lands ensuring the same degree of protection on the east side as is afforded by levees on the west side of the river. Nothing in the Act was meant to prevent, postpone, delay, or in anywise interfere with the execution of that part of the project on the east side of the river.

Consolidated funding. All unexpended balances of previous appropriations for flood control on the Mississippi River under the Flood Control Act of 1917 and the Flood Control Act of 1923, were made available for expenditure except for work under section 13.

== Section 2: Local contribution and participation ==
Reiterated the soundness of the principle of local contribution toward the cost of flood-control work which had been incorporated in all previous national legislation, recognizing the special interest of the local population in its own protection, and as a means of preventing inordinate requests for unjustified items of work having no material national interest.

Recognized the expenditure estimated at approximately $292 million already made by the local interests; in view of the extent of national concern in the control of these floods in the interests of national prosperity, the flow of interstate commerce, and the movement of the United States mails; and, in view of the gigantic scale of the project, involving flood waters of a volume and flowing from a drainage area largely outside the States most affected, and far exceeding those of any other river in the United States, no local contribution to the project was required, and given.

== Section 3: Local entities must maintain completed projects ==
This section prohibited expending funds until the states or levee districts gave assurances that they would maintain all flood-control works after their completion, except controlling and regulating spillway structures, including special relief levees; would agree to accept land turned over to them, and provide without cost to the United States, all rights of way for levee foundations and levees on the main stem of the Mississippi River between Cape Girardeau, Missouri, and the Head of Passes.

=== Relief from liability ===
A key provision of FCA 1928 was that no liability of any kind would attach to or rest upon the United States for any damage from or by floods or flood waters at any place. The act also stated that, if on any stretch of the banks of the Mississippi River it was impracticable to construct levees (either because such construction is not economically justified or because such construction would unreasonably restrict the flood channel) and previously unaffected lands are subjected to overflow and damage by reason of the construction of levees on the opposite banks of the river, the government has a duty to acquire either ownership or flowage rights over such lands.

In January 2008, this liability provision played a controversial role concerning the legal cases resulting from the levee failures in New Orleans during the Hurricane Katrina disaster in 2005. Federal Judge Stanwood Duval, of the US District Court for Eastern Louisiana, held the US Army Corps of Engineers responsible for defects in the design of the concrete I-wall floodwall constructed in the earthen levees of the 17th Street Canal in the period following Hurricane Betsy (1965). However, he further stated that the agency could not be held financially liable due to the sovereign immunity provided by this legislation.

In April 2010, scholars with the Louisiana State Office of Historic Preservation approved the text for a Historic Plaque for the 17th Street Canal. After receiving permission from city agencies and the Corps of Engineers, the flood protection group Levees.org installed the Plaque at ground zero, on New Orleans city property, in the Lakeview neighborhood. The text of the plaque read as follows:

On August 29, 2005, a federal floodwall atop a levee on the 17th Street Canal, the largest and most important drainage canal for the city, gave way here causing flooding that killed hundreds. This breach was one of 50 ruptures in the federal Flood Protection System that occurred that day. In 2008, the US District Court placed responsibility for this floodwall's collapse squarely on the US Army Corps of Engineers; however, the agency is protected from financial liability in the Flood Control Act of 1928.

== Section 4: Flowage Rights ==
Provide Federal government flowage rights for additional destructive flood waters that will pass by reason of diversions from the main channel of the Mississippi River. Provided that any benefits to property from execution of the flood-control plan would be taken into consideration in reducing the amount of compensation paid for flowage rights.

Provided a method to obtain lands to execute the plan. The Government can acquire by condemnation, purchase, or donation any lands, easements, or rights of way which are needed in carrying out this project. Provisions of the Rivers and Harbors Act of 1918 were made applicable to the acquisition of lands, easements, or rights of way needed for works of flood control.

== Section 5: Surveys ==
The Secretary of War, on the recommendation of the Chief of Engineers, could engage the services and assistance of the Coast and Geodetic Survey, the United States Geological Survey, or other Government mapping agencies, in preparing maps required for this project.

== Section 6: Rights of Way ==
Authorized expenditure of funds up to $10 million for previously authorized flood control works on the Mississippi River, including levee work on the Mississippi River between Rock Island, Illinois, and Cape Girardeau, Missouri, and outlets and tributaries affected by the backwaters of the Mississippi. Stipulated that, between Rock Island, Illinois, and Cape Girardeau, Missouri, the States or levee districts are to provide rights of way at no cost to the United States, contribute one-third of the costs, and maintain them after completion.

Authorized emergency expenses. In an emergency, funds may be expended for the maintenance of any levee when it is demonstrated that the levee can not be adequately maintained by the State or levee district. Since Section 9 of the United States Constitution prohibits spending of public money except by the express direction of Congress, this authorization allows the Government to step in to assist local and state governments in an emergency.

== Section 7: Emergency fund ==
$5 million was authorized as an emergency fund in rescue work or in the repair or maintenance of any flood-control work on any tributaries of the Mississippi River threatened or destroyed by flood including the flood of 1927.

== Section 8: Work of the Mississippi River Commission ==
The Mississippi River Commission, under direction of the Secretary of War and supervision of the Chief of Engineers was to execute the project. For all other purposes, the existing laws governing the commission remained unchanged. The commission was to inspect frequently enough and hold hearings to enable it to acquire first-hand information as to conditions and problems of flood control within the area of its jurisdiction. It established that the president/executive officer of the commission is to qualifications prescribed by law for the Assistant Chief of Engineers and be given the rank, pay, and allowances of a brigadier general. It established the salaries for officers of the Commission.

== Section 10: Proceed speedily and provide reports on various rivers systems ==
Surveys of the Mississippi River and its tributaries were to be done as speedily as practicable.

Directed the Corps of Engineers to prepare and submit reports on projects for flood control on tributaries of the Mississippi River including

- The Red River and tributaries
- The Yazoo River and tributaries
- The White River and tributaries
- The Saint Francis River and tributaries
- The Arkansas River and tributaries
- The Ohio River and tributaries
- The Missouri River and tributaries
- The Illinois River and tributaries

The reports were to include

- the effect of further flood control of the lower Mississippi River through control of flood waters in tributary drainage basins by the establishment of a reservoir system
- the benefits that will accrue to navigation and agriculture
- capacity of local districts to receive and hold flood waters
- prospective income from reservoir waters (e.g., hydropower)
- use of reservoirs for public and private uses
- return flow of waters, and
- the stabilizing effect on stream flow to prevent erosion, siltage, and improve navigation.

This direction from Congress had the impact of forcing the balancing of competing interests when considering flood control projects.

Authorized $5 million to be used out of the appropriation authorized by the Act, in addition to amounts authorized in the Rivers and Harbors Act of 1927, to be expended for the projects authorized. Directed flood surveys to be made simultaneously with the flood-control work on the Mississippi River.

Directed that the United States Department of Agriculture and such other agencies determine how Mississippi Valley floods may be controlled by proper forestry practice.

== Section 11: Previous projects below Cape Girardeau ==
Directed the Mississippi River Commission to examine the Mississippi River below Cape Girardeau, Missouri, where levees had previously been constructed on one side of the river and adversely affected land on the other side of the river. Directed construction of levees possible to reduce the impact if economically justified.

Concerning a recommendation by the Mississippi River Commission in October 1912 to build a levee from Tiptonville, Tennessee, to the Obion River in Tennessee, the Commission was authorized to resurvey the proposed levee and relocate the same if necessary. If such levee was found feasible and approved by the board, it shall be built out of appropriations hereafter to be made.

== Section 12: All other laws inconsistent with this law are repealed ==
All laws or parts of laws inconsistent with FCA 1928 were repealed.

== Section 13: Sacramento River flood control ==
The project for the control of floods in the Sacramento River, California, adopted by section 2 of the Act approved March 1, 1917, entitled "An Act to provide for the control of the floods of the Mississippi River and of the Sacramento River, California, and for other purposes," is hereby modified in accordance with the report of the California Debris Commission, provided that the total amounts contributed by the Federal Government, including previous amounts contributed, shall not exceed $17.6 million.

== Section 14: Title 41 USC is applicable ==
In every contract or agreement to be made or entered into for the acquisition of land either by private sale or condemnation as in this Act provided the provisions contained in section 3741 of the Revised Statutes being section 22 of title 41 of the United States Code shall be applicable.

== See also ==
For related legislation which sometime also implement flood control provisions, see the following:

- Rivers and Harbors Act
- Water Resources Development Act
- Watershed Protection and Flood Prevention Act of 1954
