= Flood control channel =

Engineered canal for managing floodwater

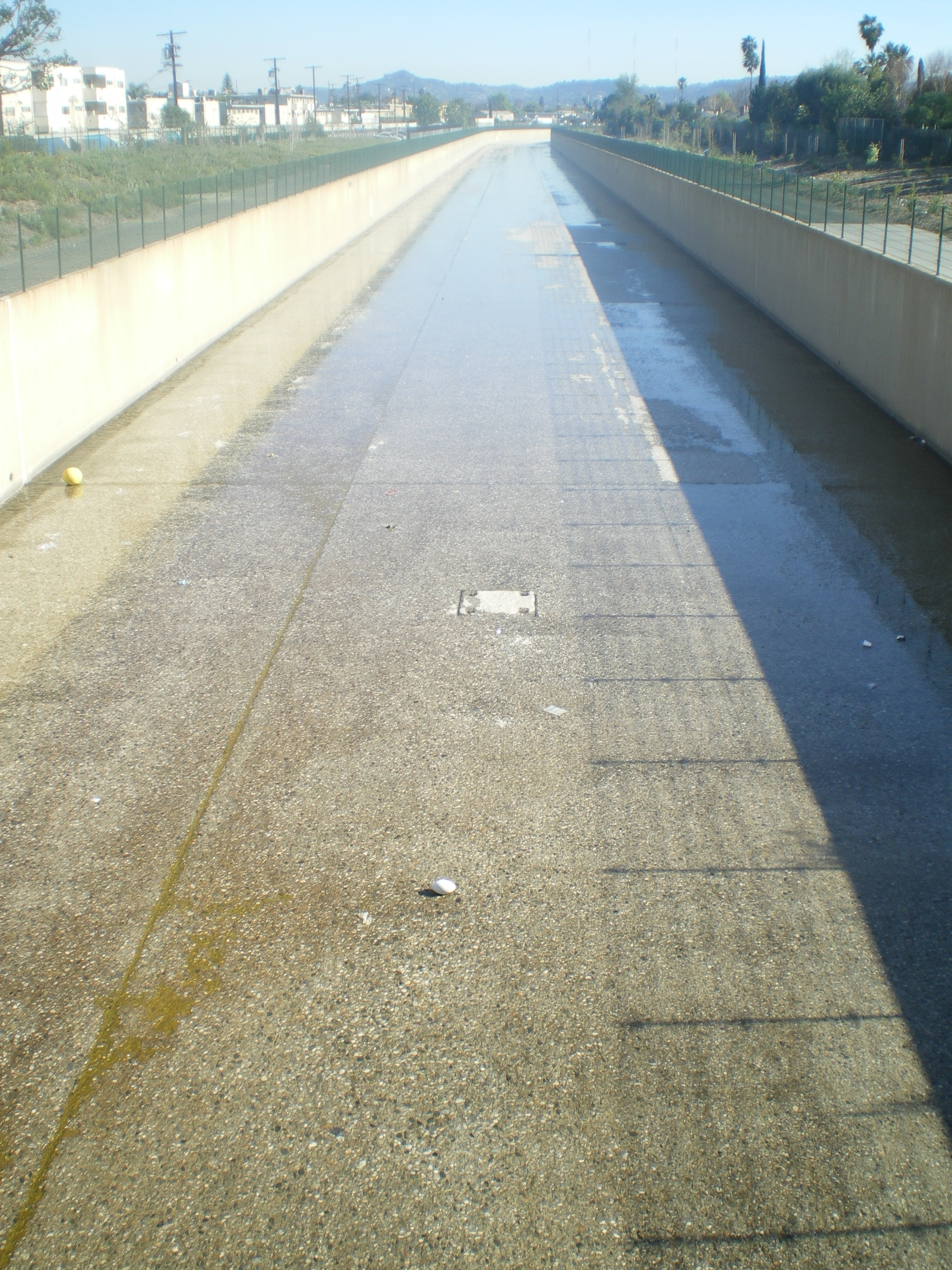
Tujunga Wash is an example of a concrete flood control channel. The concrete has previously failed during floods.

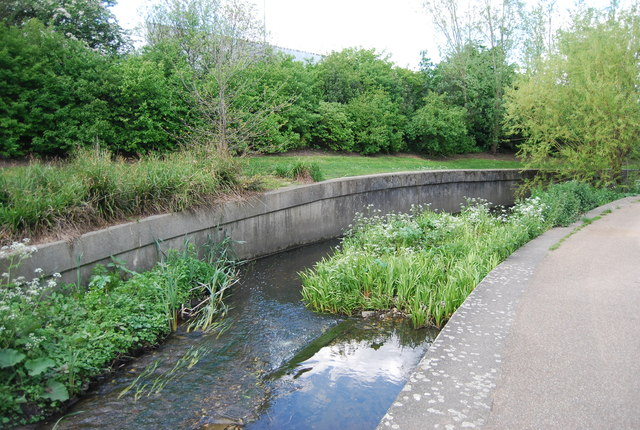
In contrast, a channelized part of the River Ravensbourne, with deliberate gravel shoals and plantings in its bed to make the flow meander and slow it down. This is cheaper than demolishing the concrete (see images below). The adjacent park also acts as a floodplain.

Flood control channels are large and empty basins where surface water can flow through but is not retained (except during flooding), or dry channels that run below the street levels of some larger cities, so that if a flash flood occurs the excess water can drain out along these channels into a river or other bodies of water. Flood channels are sometimes built on the former courses of natural waterways as a way to reduce flooding.

Channelization of this sort was commonly done in the 1960s, but is now often being undone, with "rechannelization" through meandering, vegetated, and porous paths. This is because channelizing the flow in a concrete chute often made flooding worse.

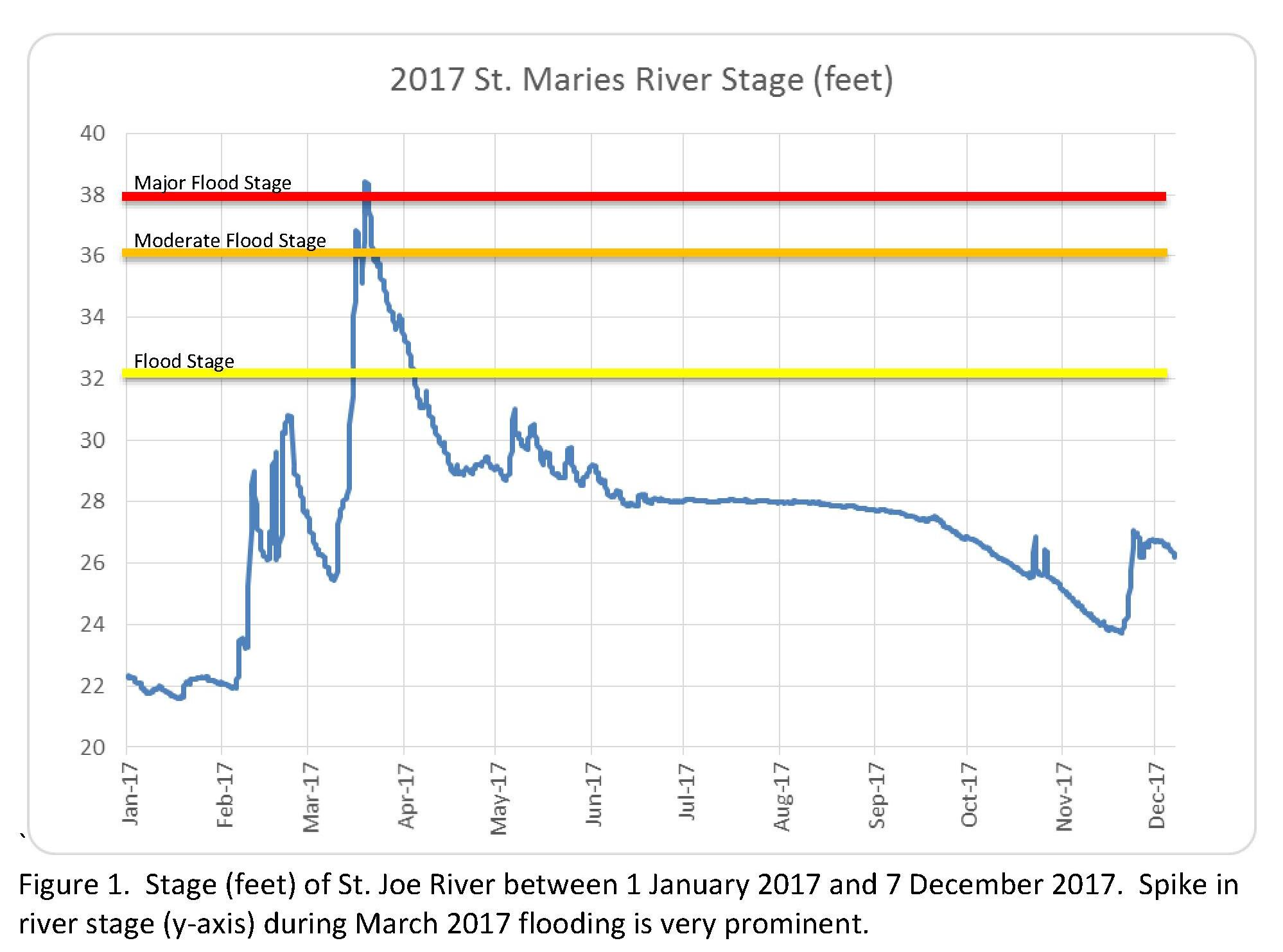
Really bad floods are caused by really brief spikes of river level. Channellization in concrete chutes speeds the water up and makes the flood peak higher, while slowing the water down spreads the flow out over time and blunts the flood peak.

Water levels during a flood tend to rise, then fall, exponentially. The peak flood level occurs as a very steep, short spike; a quick spurt of water. Anything that slows the surface runoff (marshes, meanders, vegetation, porous materials, turbulent flow, the river spreading over a floodplain) will slow some of the flow more than other parts, spreading the flow over time and blunting the spike. Even slightly blunting the spike significantly decreases the peak flood level. Generally, the higher the peak flood level, the more flood damage is done. Straight, clear, smooth concrete-walled channels speed up flow, and are therefore likely to make flooding downstream worse. Modern flood control seeks to "slow the flow", and deliberately floods some low-lying areas, ideally vegetated, to act as sponges, letting them drain again as the floodwaters go down.

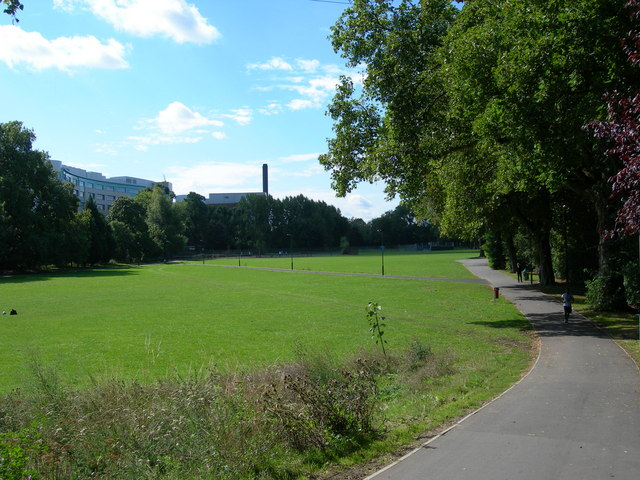
Before. Note chimney in this picture and next.

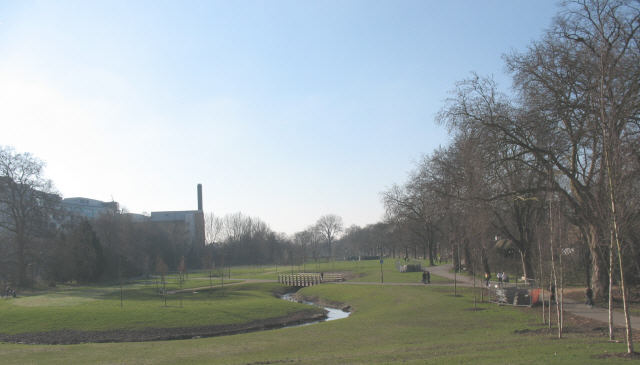
Immediately after re-meandering.

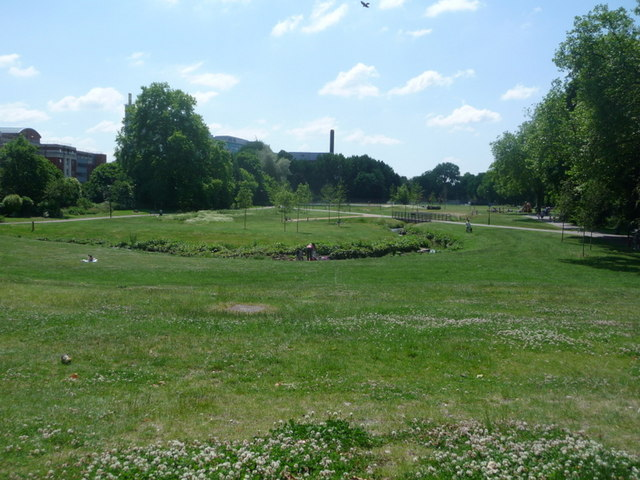
A year later, when the banks have renaturalized somewhat.

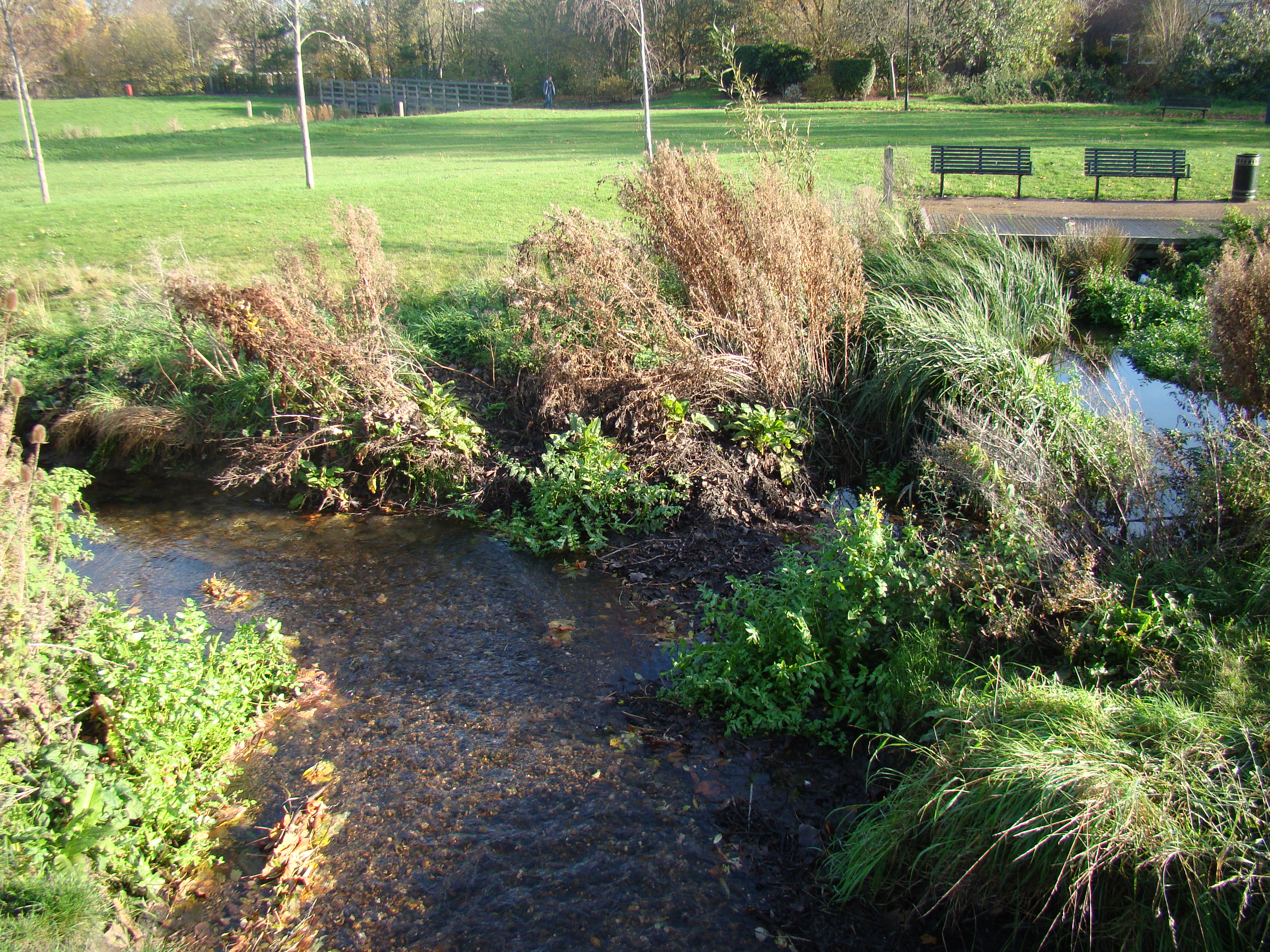
Three years after re-meandering.
Another part of the River Ravensbourne has been removed from the concrete and re-meandered. Park use more than doubled, and most people went from feeling unsafe there to feeling safe.
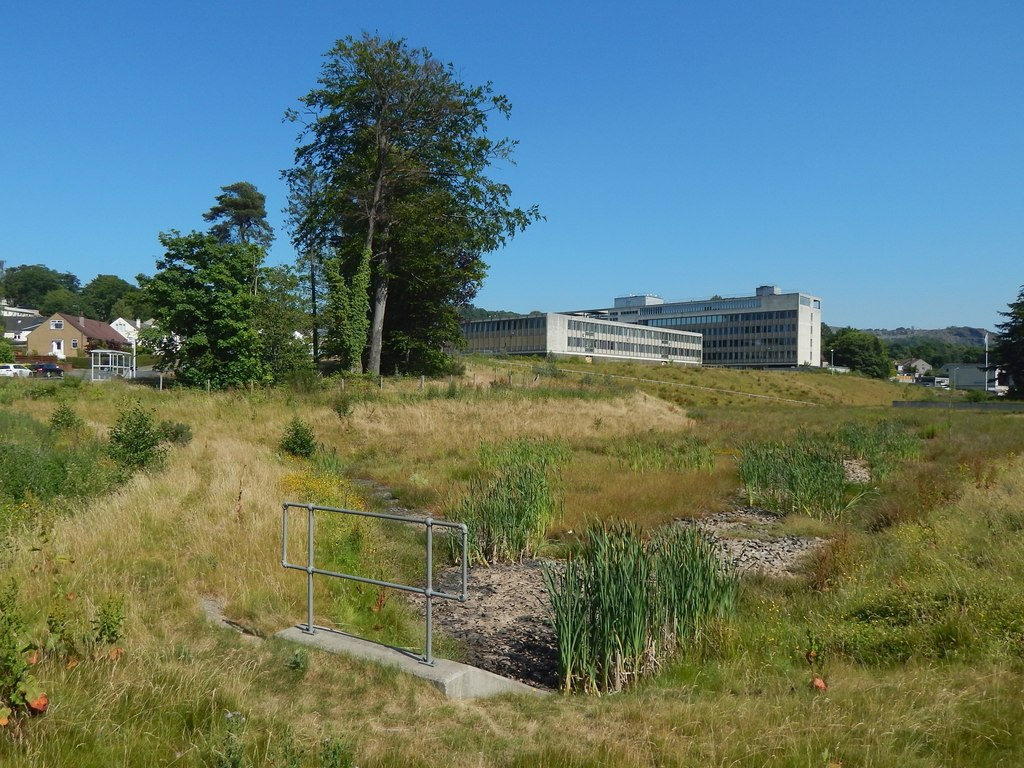
A more modern flood control measure, a flood storage pond, intended to soak up flood water and release it slowly.

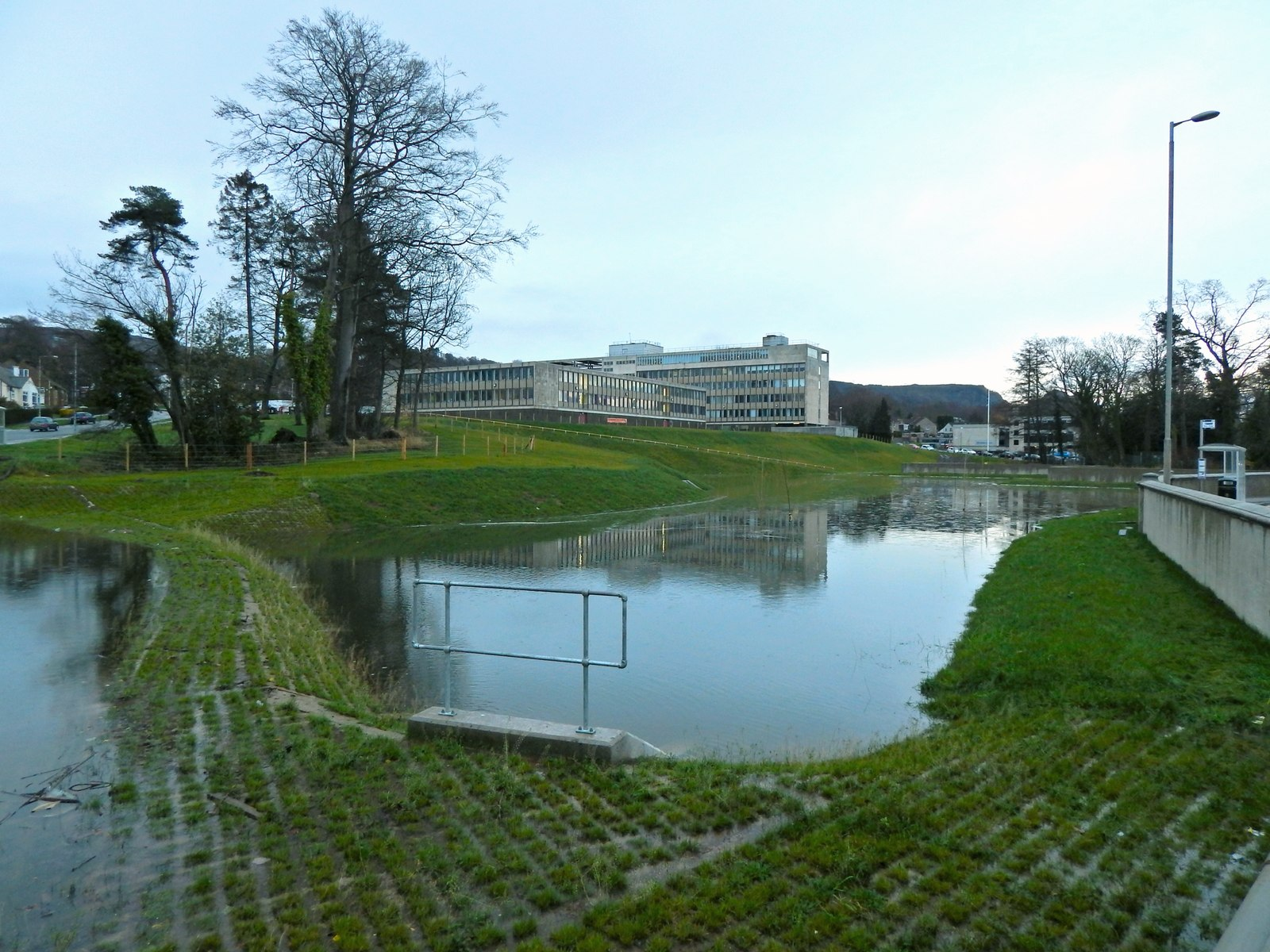
The same pond, full of the water it is detaining, during a flood.

== Levees ==
Flood control channels are not to be confused with watercourses which are simply confined between levees. These structures may be made entirely of concrete, with concrete sides and an exposed bottom, with riprap sides and an exposed bottom, or completely unlined. They often contain grade control sills or weirs to prevent erosion and maintain a level streambed.

== Distribution ==
By definition, flood control channels range from the size of a street gutter to a few hundred or even a few thousand feet wide in some rare cases. Flood control channels are found in most heavily developed areas in the world. One city with many of these channels is Los Angeles, as they became mandatory with the passage of the Flood Control Act of 1941 passed in the wake of the Los Angeles Flood of 1938.

== See also ==
- Nullah
- Drop structure
- Urban runoff
- Weir
- Levee
