= Flood Control Act of 1941 =

- Long title: An Act Authorizing the construction of certain public works on rivers and harbors for flood control, and for other purposes
- Enacted by: the 77th United States Congress

Citations
- Public law: Pub. L. 77–228
- Statutes at Large: 55 Stat. 638

Codification
- Acts amended: Flood Control Act of 1938
- Titles amended: 33

Legislative history
- Introduced in the House as H.R. 4911; Committee consideration by House Flood Control; Passed the House on; Passed the Senate on; Signed into law by President Franklin D. Roosevelt on August 18, 1941

Major amendments
- Flood Control Act of 1944

The Flood Control Act of 1941 was an Act of the United States Congress signed into law by US President Franklin Roosevelt that authorized civil engineering projects such as dams, levees, dikes, and other flood control measures through the United States Army Corps of Engineers and other Federal agencies. It is one of a number of Flood Control Acts that is passed nearly annually by the US Congress.

== Projects ==
=== Dams ===
- Kinzua Dam (begun in 1960, completed in 1965)
- Fort Gibson Dam (begun in 1941, completed in 1949)
- Allatoona Dam (begun in 1946, completed in 1950)
- Railroad relocations due to reservoirs created by dams were included.

=== Stormwater control ===
- Construction of mandatory storm drains and flood control channels throughout the city of Los Angeles in the wake of the Los Angeles Flood of 1938.
- Levees of the Red River backwater.

== See also ==
- Water Resources Development Act
- Rivers and Harbors Act

for related legislation which sometime also implement flood control provisions.
