= Flood Control Act of 1948 =

The Flood Control Act of 1948 was passed by the United States Congress on June 30, 1948, giving the Chief of Engineers the power to authorize minor flood control projects without having to get Congressional approval. It also authorized several larger flood control projects and amended the budget set forth in the Flood Control Act of 1946.

== Budget ==
The estimated cost of the projects approved in the bill was $110,450,000. The bill also increased the maximum annual expenditure on repair and maintenance from $1,000,000 to $2,000,000 with no more than $100,000 being spent on any one location. $62,000,000 was allotted to the Secretary of the Army to make improvements and $10,000,000 was allotted to the Army and Department of Agriculture to conduct surveys and examinations. Lastly $25,000,000 million was allocated as emergency funding for flood control.
