= Flood Control Act of 1917 =

United States federal law

- Other short titles: Ransdell–Humphreys Flood Control Act of 1917
- Long title: An Act To provide for the control of the floods of the Mississippi River and of the Sacramento River, California, and for other purposes
- Enacted by: the 64th United States Congress
- Effective: March 1, 1917

Citations
- Public law: Public Law 64-367
- Statutes at Large: 39 Stat. 948

Codification
- Acts amended: Swamp Land Act of 1850, River and Harbor Act of 1916

Legislative history
- Introduced in the House of Representatives as H.R. 14777 by Benjamin G. Humphreys (D‑MS) on April 17, 1916; Committee consideration by House Committee on Flood Control; Passed the House of Representatives on May 17, 1916 (234–112); Passed the Senate on February 26, 1917 (40–16) with amendment; House of Representatives agreed to Senate amendment on February 27, 1917 (Voice vote); Signed into law by President Woodrow Wilson on March 1, 1917

Major amendments
- Flood Control Act of 1928 (45 Stat. 534)

The Flood Control Act of 1917 ("Ransdell–Humphreys Flood Control Act of 1917", Ch 144, 39 Stat. 948, enacted March 1, 1917) is an Act of Congress enacted in response to costly floods in the lower Mississippi Valley, the Northeast, and the Ohio Valley between 1907 and 1913. It has been described as "the beginning of modern flood control policy" in the United States.

== Legislative provisions ==
It was enacted to control floods on the Mississippi River, the Ohio River, and the Sacramento River, not to exceed in the aggregate $45,000,000, with not more than $10,000,000 during any one fiscal year.

All money appropriated under the act was expended under the direction of the Secretary of War in accordance with the plans, specifications, and recommendations of the Mississippi River Commission as approved by the Chief of Engineers. It included surveys and estimates to determine the cost of protecting the Mississippi River basin from floods. It also provided for the salaries, clerical, office, traveling, and miscellaneous expenses of the Mississippi River Commission.

Local interests protected thereby were to contribute not less than one-half of the cost of construction. At the completion of any levee building, the levees were to be locally maintained with the Federal Government retaining control.

No money was to be expended for any right of way for any levee which may be constructed in cooperation with any State or levee district under authority of this Act, but all such rights of way shall be provided free of cost to the United States.

Other watercourses connected with the Mississippi River could, in the discretion of the commission, also be improved.

Upon the completion of any levee constructed for flood control under authority of this Act, the levee was to be turned over to the levee district protected for maintenance; but for all other purposes the United States retained control upon completion.

The act also required comprehensive studies of the watersheds as to the extent and character of the area to be affected by the proposed improvement, the probable effect upon any navigable water or waterway, possible economical development and utilization of water power, and other uses properly related to or coordinated with the project. All reports on preliminary examinations authorized, together with the report of the Board of Engineers for Rivers and Harbors were to be submitted to the Secretary of War by the Chief of Engineers and transmitted to the House of Representatives.

== See also ==
For related legislation which sometime also implement flood control provisions, see also the following:

- Rivers and Harbors Act
- Water Resources Development Act
- Watershed Protection and Flood Prevention Act of 1954
