= 1917 Franco-Russian agreement =

1917 treaty

The 1917 Franco-Russian agreement was a secret treaty between the French Third Republic and the Russian Empire to support one another's territorial claims in settlement following the First World War. Under the agreement France recognised Russia's claim to any portions of Poland that she could occupy, and Russia supported France's claim for the return of Alsace–Lorraine from Germany and right to occupy other parts of Germany in the post-war period.

Formal acceptance letters between the two parties were exchanged on 10 March 1917, but the treaty had little effect as the Russian imperial government fell days later during the February Revolution. Also, the French government of Aristide Briand fell on 20 March, and representatives of the replacement Alexandre Ribot administration agreed with the new Russian Provisional Government that the treaty had been a mistake.

== Background ==
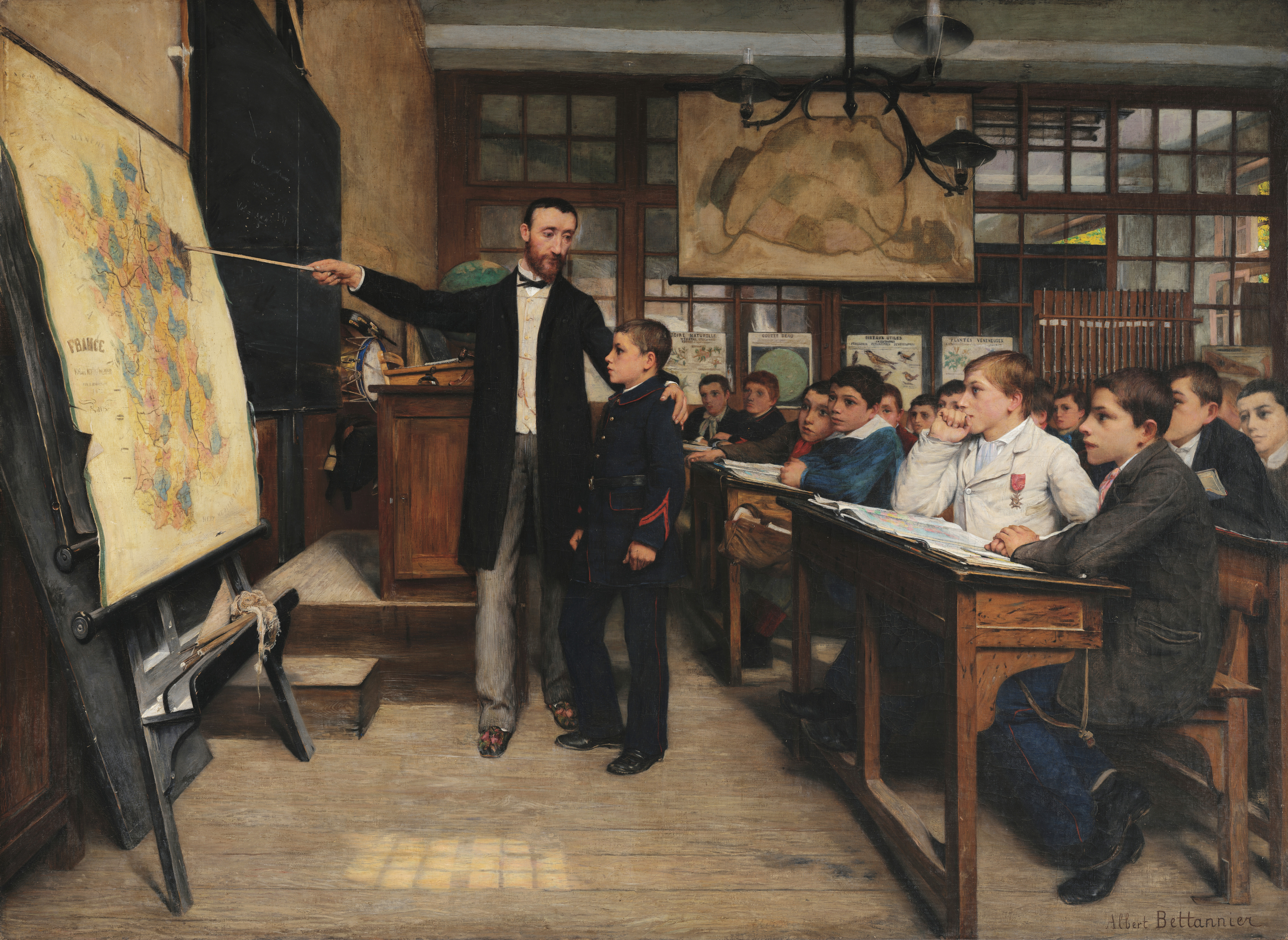
An 1887 painting depicting French schoolchildren learning about the lost territory of Alsace–Lorraine

With defeat in the 1870–1871 Franco-Prussian War France had lost the territory of Alsace–Lorraine to Germany. A revanchist movement to recover the territory played a key role in French politics thereafter and a desire for military strength led France to enter into an alliance with the Russian Empire in the 1890s. That stood in opposition to the Triple Alliance of Germany, Austria-Hungary and Italy. Russia had little interest in who controlled Alsace–Lorraine but wanted support for its ambitions in Eastern Europe and the Balkans.

Russia's western frontier had been formed during the late 18th and early 19th centuries with the partitioning of Poland between Russia, Germany and Austria-Hungary. The First World War broke out in summer 1914; a Russian invasion of East Prussia was halted and Russian forces were afterwards gradually pushed back further into their own territory. The Russian Brusilov Offensive of summer 1916 won back territory in Galicia and destabilised Austria-Hungary at a heavy cost in casualties. However, the offensive soon lost momentum, as the Russian advance was stopped by German reinforcements by the end of August. Romania joined the war on the Russian side in August 1916, but it was defeated by German and Austro-Hungarian troops. The Western Front where France and Britain fought Germany had remained largely static after initial German advances in Belgium and north-eastern France. French attempts to seize Alsace–Lorraine at the start of the war had been unsuccessful. Nonetheless, by early 1917 the initiative was with the Allies, who planned simultaneous attack on all fronts.

== Treaty negotiations ==
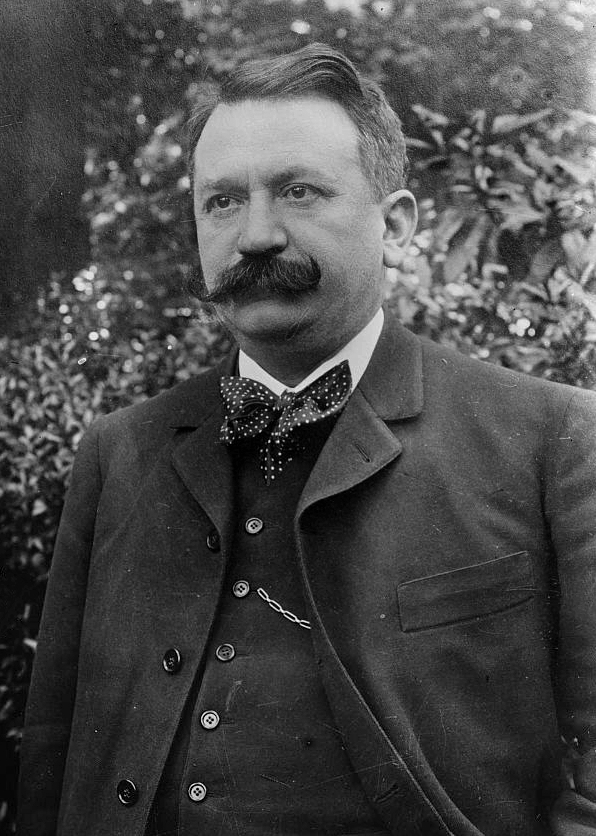
Gaston Doumergue

Discussions between France and Russia on a post-war revision of frontiers began as early as 1915. On 9 March 1916 the Russian foreign minister Sergey Sazonov had written to the Russian ambassador in Paris Alexander Izvolsky, ahead of an upcoming allied conference, to state that his government was prepared to grant France and Britain free rein in determining the new western frontiers of Germany if Russia was granted the same freedom for the eastern frontiers of Germany and Austria-Hungary and that there was no question of the creation of a Polish state.

High level discussions proceeded on 3 February 1917 when the French Minister of the Colonies Gaston Doumergue met with the Russian Tsar Nicholas II. Nicholas told Doumergue that he was worried about interference in the settlement of post-war borders in Europe from US President Woodrow Wilson who he accused of carrying out "phony humanitarianism". Nicholas argued that France needed to take steps to ensure she was supported in discussions over the border. Doumergue reported that to the French government, and Philippe Berthelot was tasked to draft an agreement in general terms that both nations would support each other militarily, industrially and economically, without detail of the border agreement. Russian Foreign Minister Nikolai Pokrovsky reported details of the meeting to Izvolsky and Sazonov (who was then ambassador to Britain) on 12 February. He stated that Doumergue had asked Nicholas for support on French claims to Alsace–Lorraine, for special treatment of the Saarland (which was to effectively become part of France) and for the separation of all territory on the west bank of the Rhine from Germany to form a new, neutral political entity. Pokrovsky noted that Nicholas had agreed in principle and that it provided a basis to secure from France support for Russia's claim of the right to define the borders of Eastern Europe and to annul the parts of the Treaty of Paris (1856) that restricted Russian military presence on Åland.

On 14 February Pokrovsky wrote to the French ambassador in Petrograd, Maurice Paléologue, to reiterate his support for French proposals, adding that he would support French military occupation of the western Rhine territory after the war. Paléologue and Doumergue thought they had the authority to proceed and drafted a treaty outlining the French border proposals. News of that shocked the French government, which feared the reaction of its British allies if the treaty was leaked to them. Izvolsky called at the French foreign ministry on 16 February to seek a reciprocal agreement on Russia's ambitions for Eastern Europe. The French initially considered that the 1915 Constantinople Agreement was sufficient quid pro quo, but Russia insisted and relied on Berthelot's draft document that promised co-operation between the nations. France eventually agreed, and a secret treaty was produced that stated that in post-war settlements, Russia would recognise France's claim to Alsace–Lorraine while France would support Russia's claim to whatever portions of Poland that could be conquered. Formal acceptance letters were exchanged on 10 March, and the following day, Izvolsky wrote to Pokrovsky and stated that France had recognised Russia's complete independence in establishing its future Western frontier.

== Aftermath ==
Territorial changes in Europe resulting from the First World War

The agreement did not survive the February Revolution in Russia (8–16 March 1917) and became one of the last acts of Nicholas' government. After the 15 March abdication of Nicholas II, the Russian Provisional Government on 29 March declared its support for the creation of an independent Polish state in all areas where Poles comprised the majority of the population. The French government of Aristide Briand fell on 20 March, and details of the treaty remained generally unknown until a parliamentary inquest unearthed them some months later. The Provisional Government's foreign minister, Pavel Milyukov, described the agreement as a mistake, and the new French prime minister, Alexandre Ribot, indicated his agreement. By June, the French demands for the post-war settlement extended only to the return of Alsace–Lorraine and the payment of reparations by the Central Powers.

The entry of the United States into the war in April 1917 and the ongoing political and military collapse of Russia saw the Western Allies come around to the idea of an independent Poland as a means of embarrassing Germany. On 26 April the British chancellor of the exchequer, Andrew Bonar Law, publicly stated the government's support on the matter. In June, the French government formally recognised the Blue Army as the Polish national army.

The British government regarded the proposed neutral Rhineland state as a mistake that would cause instability in Western Europe. Its policy was instead to rely on the threat of American power as a counter to future German militarism. British Foreign Secretary Arthur Balfour declared on 19 December 1917 that his government had never supported the French ambitions for an independent Rhineland.

Towards the end of the war, with an Allied victory in sight, on 3 November 1918 the independent Second Polish Republic was proclaimed. The post-war settlement between the Allies and Germany, the 1919 Treaty of Versailles, defined the Polish western border with Germany. The eastern border was proposed by the newly founded League of Nations to lie on the Curzon Line. Polish ambitions for further territory led to the Polish–Soviet War and to the Treaty of Riga with the Soviet Union securing more land to the east.

The Allied forces occupied the Rhineland after the war until 1930, and the Rhineland remained demilitarised until it was reoccupied by German troops in 1936. In response to German defaults on reparations payments that were due under the Treaty of Versailles, French and Belgian troops occupied the Ruhr region between 1923 and 1925.

The Treaty of Versailles also placed Saarland under a League of Nations mandate as the Territory of the Saar Basin from 1920 that was policed by Allied and neutral troops. In 1935, the region returned Germany after a plebiscite massively supported German rule.
