= Flood Control Act of 1946 =

The Flood Control Act of 1946 was passed by the United States Congress on July 24, 1946; to authorize 123 projects including several dams and hydroelectric power plants like Old Hickory Lock and Dam in Tennessee and the Fort Randall Dam in South Dakota. It also allowed bank adjustments and re-directions for several rivers. The plan authorized the Secretary of War to regulate the surveillance of flood control and other improvements as well as the ability to call for a review of said surveys. The Secretary of Agriculture and the Department of Engineers were also charged with conducting surveys relating to their respective fields.

== Budget ==
The plan allocated $1,427,097,038 for the projects. The act also allotted a maximum of $1,000,000 annually to be used for removing debris and clearing channels, $2,000,000 to be used for rescue and repair of levees damaged by flooding, and $957,000,000 to be used for other miscellaneous actions.

== Significant Projects ==
- Flood protection in the Potomac River Basin and the construction of the Savage River Dam
- The construction of a reservoir in Rappahannock River Basin
- The construction of the Falling Spring Dam and a reservoir on the Jackson River
- The construction of four reservoirs in the Yadkin-Pee Dee River Basin
- Extensive improvements and the construction of levees on the tributaries of the lower Mississippi River
- Allocation of 69,000 acre-feet (85,000,000 m^{3}) for irrigation storage in the Canton reservoir on the North Canadian River
- The construction of the West Fork Reservoir on the West Fork River
- The construction of the Belton Reservoir and the allocation of 45,000 acre-feet (56,000,000 m^{3}) to be reserved for irrigation storage
- The construction of the Lucky Peak Reservoir on the Boise River
