= Watershed Protection and Flood Prevention Act of 1954 =

United States federal statute

The United States Watershed Protection and Flood Prevention Act of 1954 (Pub. L. 83–566) is a United States statute. It has been amended several times.

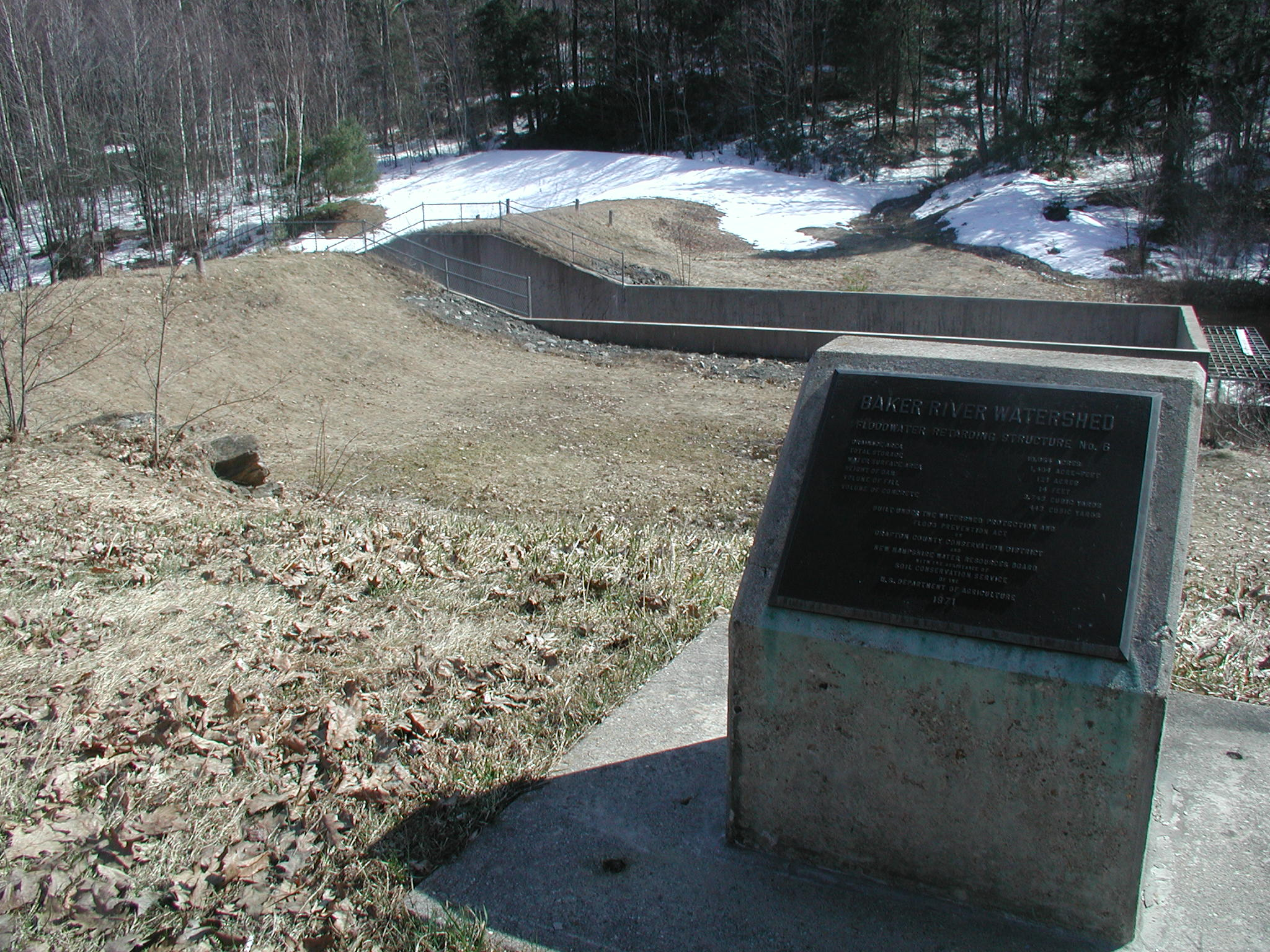
Baker River Watershed Floodwater Retarding Structure No.6

Under this Act, the Soil Conservation Service at the Department of Agriculture provides planning assistance and construction funding for projects constructed by local sponsors, often in the form of flood control districts. Restrictions on projects include: the size of the watershed must be 250,000 acres (1011 km²) or less; no single structure may provide more than 12,500 acre-feet (15,400,000 m^{3}) of flood water retention; no single dam may provide more than 25,000 acre-feet (31,000,000 m^{3}) of total capacity; and projects with costs greater than $5 million or with structures with total capacities greater than 25,000 acre-feet (31,000,000 m^{3}) must be approved by Congress.

The original 1954 statute sought cooperation between the federal government and states and localities to prevent flood damage. The Secretary of Agriculture was authorized to construct flood protection measures below a certain volume limit. Such initiatives were to be cost-shared and localities were required to contribute rights-of-way. The law also required that the Secretary of the Interior be consulted regarding plans which affect reclamation, irrigation or public lands under the Secretary of the Interior. Related views were to be submitted with project plans to the Congress.

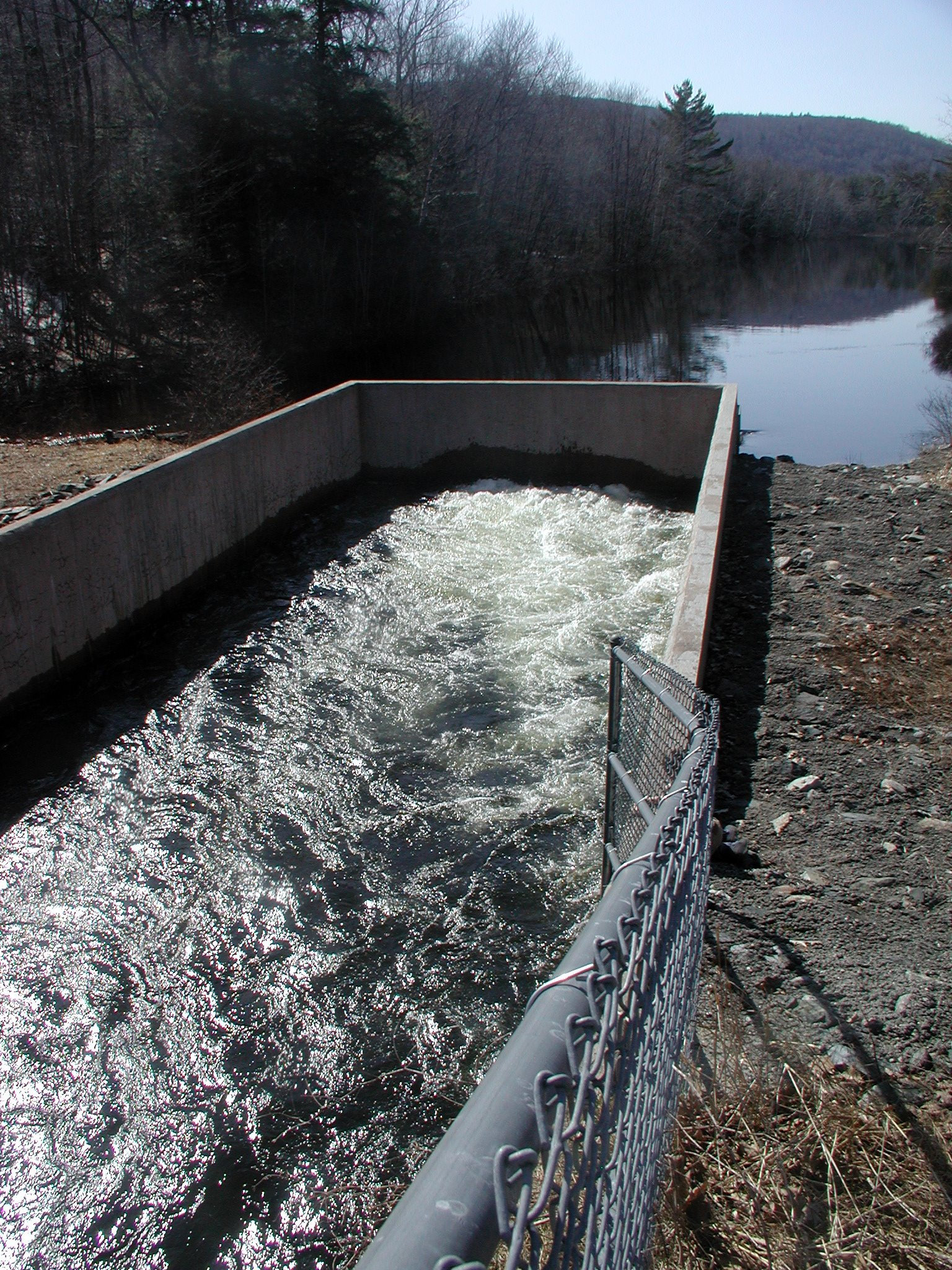
Baker River Watershed Floodwater Retarding Structure No.6 Spillway

Amendments enacted in 1956 imposed volume limits on projects authorized to be undertaken by the Secretary of Agriculture without Congressional approval. Projects for which the federal contribution was estimated to exceed $250,000 or which exceeded 2,500 acre-feet (3,100,000 m^{3}) were to be submitted to the Secretary of the Interior for review if they involved reclamation or irrigation lands, or public lands or wildlife under the Secretary's jurisdiction. The views of the Department of the Interior were required to accompany the report to Congress and regulations to coordinate activities of the Department of Agriculture and Interior were mandated. In addition, loans to localities were authorized and the provisions of the Act were extended to apply to Hawaii, Alaska, Puerto Rico, and the Virgin Islands.

Amendments to the Fish and Wildlife Coordination Act in 1958 (Pub. L. 85–624) also amended this statute to require the Secretary of Agriculture to notify the Secretary of the Interior regarding projects in order that the Secretary of the Interior could prepare a fish and wildlife report to be incorporated in project plans. "Full consideration" was to be given to such reports by the Secretary of Agriculture; however, the Secretary of Agriculture retained the discretion to adopt fish and wildlife recommendations which are "technically and economically feasible." Costs for related surveys and reports are to be borne by the Secretary of the Interior. Amendments adopted later that year (Pub. L. 85–865) added fish and wildlife development as an aspect of flood control projects to be constructed.
