= Mississippi (disambiguation) =

Mississippi is a southern state of the United States of America.

Mississippi may also refer to:

== Places ==
- Mississippi River, a river in central United States
- Mississippi River System, a system of rivers in the Mississippi River watershed
- Mississippi River (Ontario), a river in Eastern Ontario, Canada
- Mississippi Lake, a lake in Ontario, Canada
- Mississippi Territory, a former territory of the United States
- Republic of Mississippi, a former republic of the Confederate States of America
- Mississippi-in-Africa, a former settler colony of ex-slaves in West Africa

== Film and television ==
- Mississippi (film), a 1935 musical starring W. C. Fields and Bing Crosby
- The Mississippi (TV series), a 1983–84 TV series starring Ralph Waite

== Music ==
- Mississippi: The Album, a 2003 album by David Banner
- Mississippi (band) an Australian rock band active 1970–75

=== Songs ===
- "M-I-S-S-I-S-S-I-P-P-I", a 1916 song written by Bert Hanlon and Ben Ryan, performed and recorded by Red Foley in 1949
- "Mississippi Goddam", a 1964 song by Nina Simone
- "Mississippi" (John Phillips song), 1970
- "Mississippi" (Pussycat song), 1975
- "Mississippi" (Charlie Daniels song), 1979
- "Mississippi", a 1996 song by Paula Cole from the album This Fire
- "Mississippi" (Train song), 2001
- "Mississippi" (Bob Dylan song), 2001
- "Mississippi", a 2017 song by Jamie Lenman from the album Devolver
- "Mississippi", a song by John Linnell from the album State Songs, 1999

== Schools ==
- Mississippi College, based in Clinton, Mississippi
- Mississippi State University, located adjacent to Starkville, Mississippi
- University of Mississippi, located adjacent to Oxford, Mississippi

== Ships ==
- Mississippi-class battleship, two ships of the United States Navy in the early 20th century
- CSS Mississippi, a projected ironclad of the Confederate States Navy during the American Civil War
- MV Mississippi, a diesel towboat completed in 1993
- SS Mississippi, several steamships in use circa 1862–1931
- USS Mississippi, several ships of United States Navy since 1841

== Other uses ==
- Mississippi, word used in a counting sequence (e.g. one Mississippi, two Mississippi, etc.) to approximately measure a number of seconds, such as in American street football
- Mississippian culture, a Native American civilization from 800 CE to 1600 CE
- Mississippi Queen (bar), Bangkok go-go bar

== See also ==
- Mississippi Township (disambiguation)
- Mississippi County (disambiguation)
- Mississippian (disambiguation)
- One Mississippi (disambiguation)
