= Diana M. Holland =

United States Army general

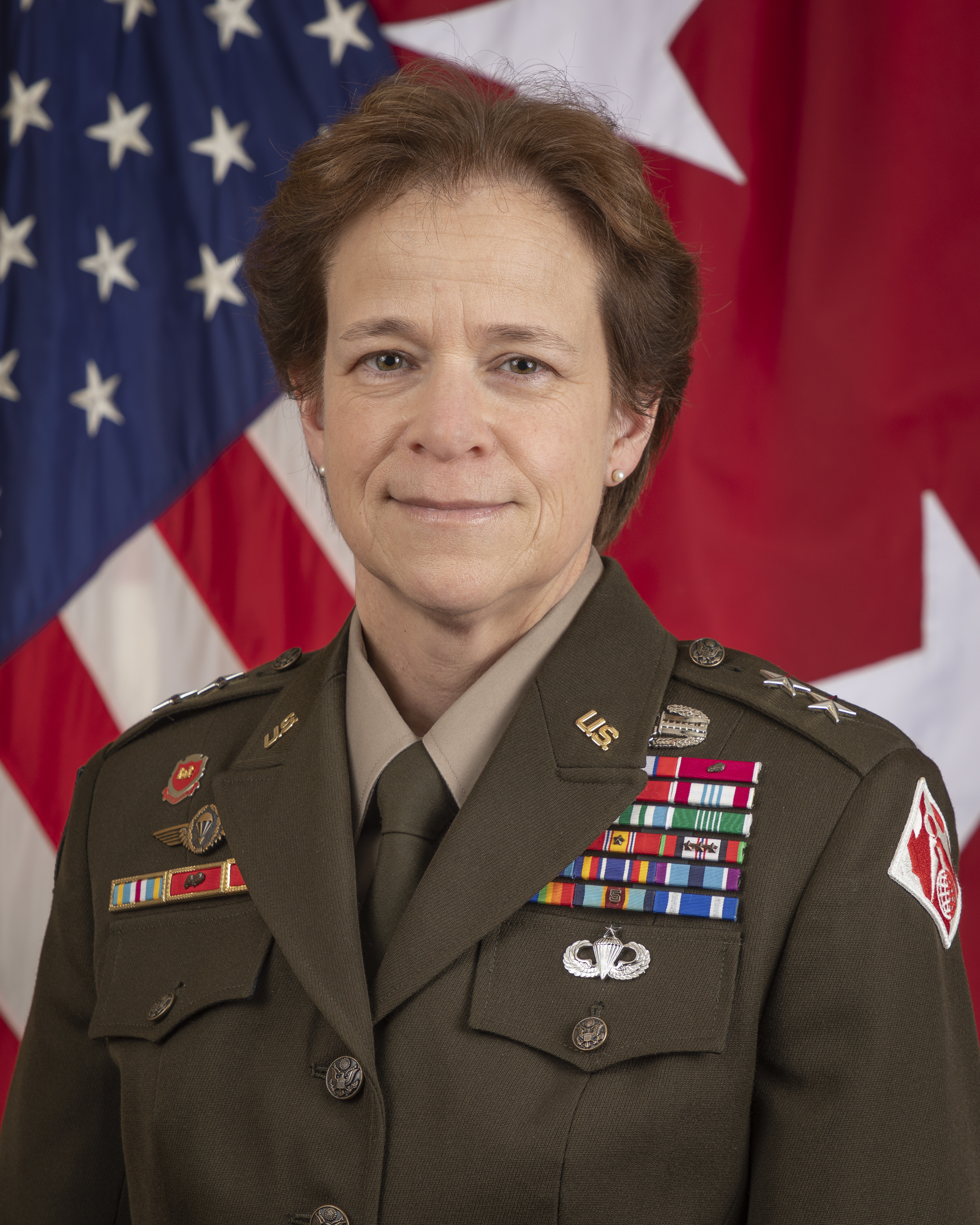
- Born: 1968 (age 57–58)
- Military career
- Allegiance: United States
- Branch: United States Army
- Service years: 1990–2023
- Rank: Major General
- Commands: United States Army Corps of Engineers Mississippi Valley Division; United States Army Corps of Engineers South Atlantic Division; 130th Engineer Brigade; 92nd Engineer Battalion
- Conflicts: Iraq War; War in Afghanistan; Operation Resolute Support
- Awards: Distinguished Service Medal (2); Legion of Merit (2); Bronze Star Medal (3)

Diana Maureen Holland (née Leach; b. 1968) is a retired major general in the United States Army, who last served as commanding general of the Mississippi Valley Division of the United States Army Corps of Engineers. She is a veteran of the wars in Iraq and Afghanistan. From January 2016 to June 2017, served as Commandant of Cadets at the United States Military Academy, the first woman to hold the position.

== Early life and education ==
Holland was born in 1968 and is a native of Santa Barbara, California. The daughter of a United States Marine, she was inspired from an early age by her father's and grandfather's military service to join the military herself. She participated in the Junior Reserve Officers' Training Corps while attending Santa Barbara High School, from which she graduated in 1986.

Holland attended the United States Military Academy from 1986 to 1990. While at West Point, she played lacrosse and was co-captain her senior year. Following graduation, she was commissioned a second lieutenant in the United States Army Corps of Engineers.

== Military career ==
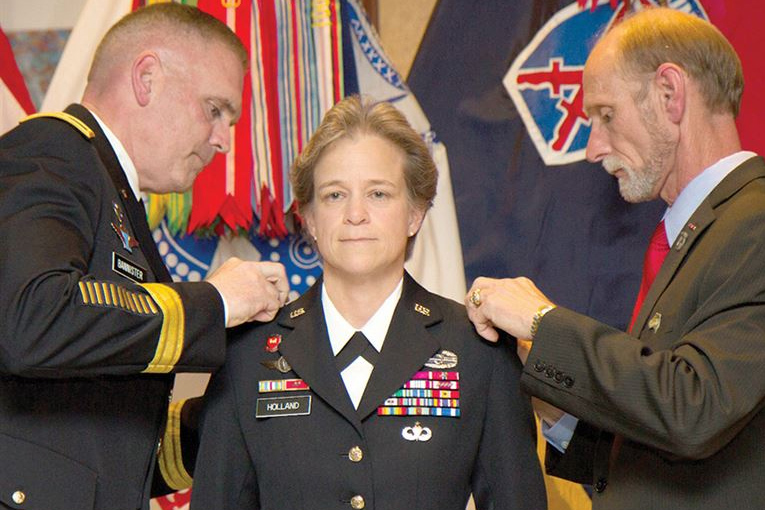
Brigadier General Holland becomes the first woman to hold the title of deputy commanding general for support in a light infantry division during her promotion ceremony at Fort Drum, July 29, 2015. Her husband, James Holland Jr., right, and Major General Jeffrey L. Bannister, 10th Mountain Division and Fort Drum commander, pin on her stars

Upon commissioning, Holland served in Germany as a vertical construction platoon leader in the 79th Engineer Combat Battalion (Heavy), and as a company executive officer and battalion assistant operations officer in the 94th Engineer Combat Battalion (Heavy). Upon returning to the United States, Holland was assigned to the 30th Engineer Battalion (Topographic), 20th Engineer Brigade, at Fort Bragg, North Carolina and served as the battalion logistics officer and then as the commander of Headquarters and Headquarters Company.

Following company command, Holland earned a Master of Arts degree at Duke University en route to a teaching assignment at the United States Military Academy, where she served as a faculty member in the history department from 1999 until 2002. She then attended the Army Command and General Staff College and the School of Advanced Military Studies (SAMS) where she earned a Master of Military Arts and Sciences degree.

In July 2004, Holland was assigned to the 3rd Infantry Division and deployed to Iraq, serving as a division plans officer and then as the operations officer in the 92nd Engineer Combat Battalion (Heavy). Returning from Iraq, she then served as a plans officer in the Operations Directorate, United States Central Command at MacDill Air Force Base in Tampa, Florida.

Holland then returned to command the 92nd Engineer Battalion (Black Diamonds) from July 2008 to June 2011, which included deploying with Task Force Diamond to eastern Afghanistan from May 2010 to April 2011. After relinquishing command, she became a United States Army War College Fellow at Georgetown University.

In 2012, Holland assumed command of the 130th Engineer Brigade at Schofield Barracks, Hawaii. The following year, she deployed with the brigade headquarters to Bagram Airfield, Afghanistan, where the unit served as the Theater Engineer Brigade, Joint Task Force Sapper. The brigade redeployed to Schofield Barracks in June 2014, where Holland relinquished command in July. In the first half of 2015, she served as executive officer to the Director of the Army Staff at the Pentagon.

In late July 2015, Holland was assigned as the Deputy Commanding General for Support, 10th Mountain Division (Light Infantry) at Fort Drum, New York, where she deployed again to Afghanistan in support of Operation Freedom's Sentinel and Operation Resolute Support. Upon assignment, she became the first woman to serve as a general officer at Fort Drum, and the first woman to serve as a deputy commanding general in one of the army's light infantry divisions.

On 15 December 2015, Holland was announced as the 76th Commandant of the Corps of Cadets at the United States Military Academy, the first woman to serve in that position.

In July 2017, Holland assumed command of the South Atlantic Division, United States Army Corps of Engineers, headquartered in Atlanta, Georgia. In this position, she oversaw army engineering activities in the Southeastern United States, Central and South America, and the Caribbean. In the first six months in this assignment, she oversaw the Corps of Engineers' support to Florida, the United States Virgin Islands, and Puerto Rico following Hurricanes Irma and Maria. The following year, she oversaw disaster response in the North Carolina and South Carolina following Hurricane Florence, and in Florida and Georgia following Hurricane Michael.

On July 11, 2019, Holland was promoted to major general. Her husband pinned on the new rank. The following year, Holland relinquished command of the South Atlantic Division and assumed command of the Mississippi Valley Division in Vicksburg, Mississippi. In October 2020, Major General Holland was appointed the 41st President of the Mississippi River Commission, the first woman to hold that position.

== Awards ==
Holland's awards and decorations include the Army Distinguished Service Medal with two oak leaf clusters, the Legion of Merit with one oak leaf cluster, the Bronze Star Medal with two oak leaf clusters, the Defense Meritorious Service Medal, the Meritorious Service Medal with four oak leaf clusters, the Combat Action Badge, the Senior Parachutist Badge, the German Parachutist Badge, and the Silver Order of the de Fleury Medal.

In June, 2018, Holland was recognized by Atlanta Magazine as a "Woman Making a Mark." And has at least 15 awards and decorations.

== Personal life ==
Holland is married to James Holland, Jr.
