= Thomas J. Hayes III =

United States Army general (1914–2004)

Thomas Jay Hayes III
- Born: August 26, 1914; Omaha, Nebraska
- Died: March 16, 2004 (aged 89); San Francisco, California
- Burial place: West Point Cemetery
- Relatives: Thomas J. Hayes Jr. (father)
- Military career
- Allegiance: United States of America
- Branch: United States Army
- Service years: 1936–1969
- Rank: Major General
- Commands: South Atlantic Division
- Conflicts: World War II
- Awards: Distinguished Service Medal (2); Legion of Merit (3); Goethals Medal

Thomas Jay Hayes III (August 26, 1914 – March 16, 2004) was a United States Army Major General.

== Early life and education ==
Hayes started at West Point in 1932, graduating as a Second Lieutenant in 1936.

== Military service ==
Following graduation from West Point, Hayes obtained a master's degree in civil engineering from Massachusetts Institute of Technology. He attended the Engineer School and was then posted to the 20th Engineer Regiment at Fort Benning.

=== World War II ===
At the outbreak of World War II, Hayes was overseeing the construction of Bluie West Eight air base in Greenland. In 1942 he was transferred to Nassau, Bahamas to oversee the construction of Oakes Field and Windsor Field.

=== Postwar ===
In 1960, now a Brigadier General, Hayes was appointed commander of the Ballistic Missile Construction Office, responsible for the construction of ICBM support and launch facilities across the U.S.

In 1961, Hayes was awarded the Goethals Medal.

Hayes served as assistant to the Chief of Engineers for NASA Support and was involved in the construction of facilities at the Kennedy Space Center.

During the buildup of U.S. forces to meet the demands of the Vietnam War and the consequential demand for support services and infrastructure in South Vietnam, Hayes noted that "supporting units seem to bear more than their share of losses as a nation progressively reduces its Armed Forces in the years between wars".

Hayes served as commander of the South Atlantic Division from 1967 until his retirement in 1969.

== Later life ==
Hayes retired from the Army in August 1969.

In October 1981, Hayes and Jan Howard, who had also lost a son in Vietnam, publicly unveiled the model of the winning design for the Vietnam Veterans Memorial.

== Personal life ==
Hayes married Jean Pedley in 1942 in Nassau. They had two daughters and a son. His son, Thomas J. Hayes IV, was killed in action in South Vietnam on 17 April 1968 while serving with the 1st Squadron, 4th Cavalry Regiment.
