= Goethals Medal =

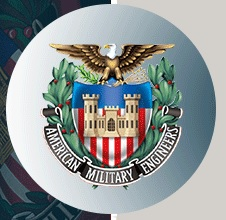
American Military Engineers

The Goethals Medal is a national award given annually by the Society of American Military Engineers (SAME) to a registered engineer who is also a member of SAME prior to nomination. The nominated engineer must have made eminent and notable contributions in engineering, design, or construction in the past five years.

The award is named in honor of General George Washington Goethals, a civil engineer and United States Army officer best known for his work as Chief engineer on the Panama Canal and his service in WWI as Acting Quartermaster General.

== Past award winners ==
- 1956 Dr. David B. Steinman
- 1957 Lt. Gen. Raymond A. Wheeler
- 1958 Col. Walker L. Cisler
- 1959 John W. Sibert, Jr.
- 1960 Lt. Gen. Samuel D. Sturgis III
- 1961 Brig. Gen. Thomas J. Hayes III
- 1962 Lt. Col. E. Robert de Luccia
- 1963 CoI. Ralph A. Tudor
- 1964 John P. Davis
- 1965 Edwin E. Abbott
- 1966 Rear Adm. Robert R. Wooding
- 1967 Capt. Albert Rhoades Marshall
- 1968 Col. Jerome 0. Ackerman
- 1969 Wendell W. Ralphe
- 1970 Dr. Arsham Amirikian
- 1971 Robert Y. Hudson
- 1972 Dr. Michael Yachnis
- 1973 Robert H. Hayes
- 1974 Col. John E. Catlin, Jr.
- 1975 James Polk Stafford, Jr.
- 1976 Henry W. Holiday
- 1977 Garland L. Watts
- 1978 Arthur Casagrande
- 1979 E. Montford Fucik
- 1980 Robert J. Taylor
- 1981 Michael A. Kolessar
- 1982 Euclid C. Moore
- 1983 George J. Zeiler
- 1984 Dr. Alexander G. Tarics
- 1985 Edward Cohen
- 1986 William L. Stevens
- 1987 Dr. Ralph J. Portier
- 1988 Gary S. Gasperino
- 1989 No winner
- 1990 Karl Rocker, Jr.
- 1991 William A. Keenan
- 1992 Dr. Robert D. Wolff
- 1993 Ralph B. Snowberger
- 1994 Eugene J. Fasullo
- 1995 Richard E. Carlson
- 1996 John C. Gribar
- 1997 Lt. Col. Wendell L Barnes, USA
- 1998 Douglas F. Burke
- 1999 James E. Tancreto
- 2000 Robert J. Taylor
- 2001 Robert M. Moore
- 2002 Arthur H. Wu, Ph.D.
- 2003 Dennis M. Firman, P.E., ACC/CEC
- 2004 Ralph T. Kaneshiro, P.E.
- 2005 Capt. Tracey J. Spielmann, P.E., USAF
- 2006 Capt. Tracey J. Spielmann
- 2007 Dominick M. Servedio
- 2008 Ruben D. Cruz, Ph.D.
- 2009 Lt. Col. Brian Files, P.E., PMP, USAF (Ret.)
- 2010 Lt. Col. Monte S. Harner, USAF
- 2011 Col. David E. Anderson, P.E., USA
- 2012 Capt. Martin Smith, P.E., USN (Ret.)
- 2013 CDR Matthew Beck, P.E., USCG
- 2014 Joanie A. Campbell, P.E.
- 2015 Cdr. Roland De Guzman, P.E., CEC, USN
- 2016 Christine Garrett, P.E.
- 2019 Melanie Kito, P.E.

== See also ==
- List of engineering awards
- George Washington Goethals
- History of the Panama Canal
- Society of American Military Engineers
