= USS Mississippi =

USS Mississippi, named either for the state of Mississippi or the Mississippi River, may refer to:

- USS Mississippi (1841), a sidewheel frigate that saw action in the Mexican–American War and was lost during the American Civil War
- USS Mississippi (BB-23), the lead ship of the Mississippi class of battleships; she saw action before World War I and was eventually sold to Greece
- USS Mississippi (BB-41), a New Mexico-class battleship that saw action during World War II
- USS Mississippi (CGN-40), a Virginia-class nuclear-powered guided missile cruiser
- USS Mississippi (SSN-782), a Virginia-class submarine commissioned in 2012

== See also ==
- MV Mississippi – several towboats of the United States Army Corps of Engineers
- CSS Mississippi – a projected ironclad of the Confederate States Navy
- HMS Wivern (1863) – a projected Confederate ironclad turret ram to be named CSS Mississippi; sold to the Royal Navy
- SS Mississippi – several steamships in use circa 1862–1931
