= Ralph A. Tudor =

American builder and civil engineer

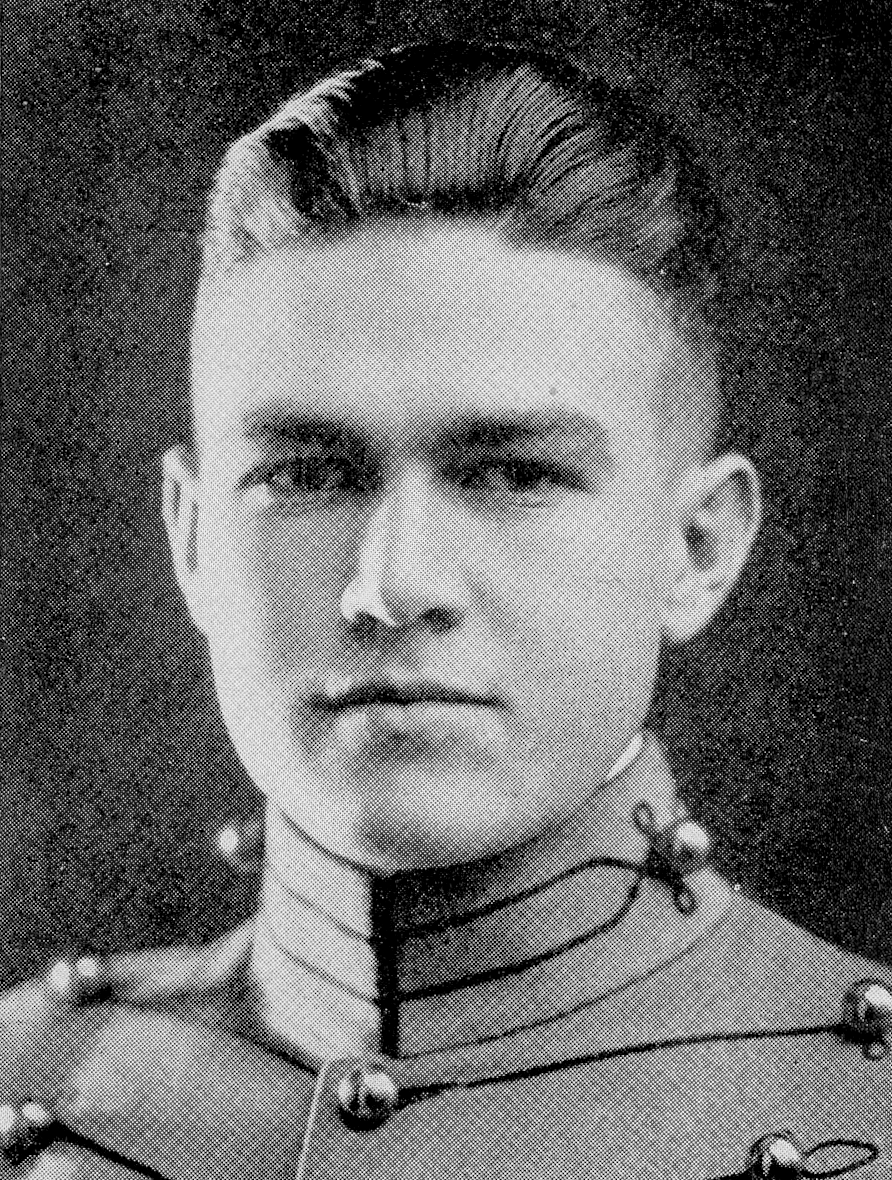
- At West Point in 1923

Under Secretary of the Interior of the United States
- In office 1953–1954
- President: Dwight D. Eisenhower

Personal details
- Born: Ralph Arnold Tudor; March 19, 1902 Colorado Springs, Colorado
- Died: November 12, 1963 (aged 61) Atherton, California
- Resting place: West Point Cemetery
- Spouse: Mary Lucile Taylor (m. 1925)
- Education: Cornell University; United States Military Academy
- Occupation: Engineer, military officer

Ralph Arnold Tudor (March 19, 1902 – November 12, 1963) was an American builder, civil engineer and Under Secretary of the United States Interior Department. The Ralph A. Tudor Medal awarded by the Society of American Military Engineers is named for him.

== Biography ==
Ralph Arnold Tudor was born in Colorado Springs on March 19, 1902, and grew up in western Oregon. He graduated from Sutherlin High School in 1919. Tudor earned a degree in civil engineering specializing in hydraulics at Cornell University in June 1925. He graduated from the U.S. Military Academy at West Point in June 1923, and was an officer in the Corps of Engineers from June 1924 until leaving the Army in August 1929. Tudor later worked for a number of construction companies in the San Francisco area where he specialized in road and bridge construction.

He married Mary Lucile Taylor in 1925, and they had one daughter.

Tudor returned to the Army during World War II, serving as a colonel in the Corps of Engineers from March 1941 to April 1946. He was awarded the Legion of Merit for his wartime service. After the war, he lived in San Francisco and then in Palo Alto, California.

Tudor was acquainted with Douglas McKay, a former governor of Oregon, who was appointed Secretary of the Interior by President Dwight D. Eisenhower. In March 1953, McKay arranged to have Tudor appointed Under Secretary of the Interior. As Under Secretary, Tudor was responsible for much of the administrative work of the department. He helped select persons to run the various bureaus that were part of the Interior Department, including the Bureau of Mines, the Bureau of Reclamation, and the Bonneville Power Administration. Tudor coordinated the Department's legislative program and was involved with a number of environmental issues that arose during the early years of the Eisenhower administration, including the Hells Canyon and Echo Park controversies. Tudor served until September 1954 when he resigned to return to his construction business in California.

He died from a heart attack at his home in Atherton, California on November 12, 1963, and was buried at West Point Cemetery.
