= Mississippi Valley Division =

One of the eight permanent divisions of the U.S. Army Corps of Engineers

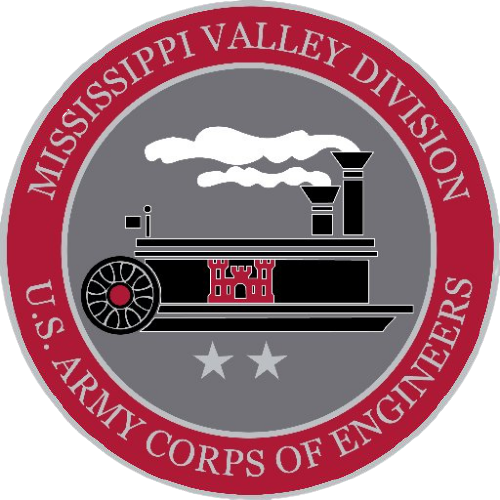
- Division emblem
- Country: United States of America
- Branch: U.S. Army
- Garrison/HQ: Vicksburg, Mississippi
- Engagements: Mississippi River floods, Gulf Coast Hurricanes, Drought in the Mississippi River Watershed, Relative Sea Level Rise, Climate change
- Website: www.mvd.usace.army.mil

Commanders
- Current commander: Major General Kimberly A. Peeples

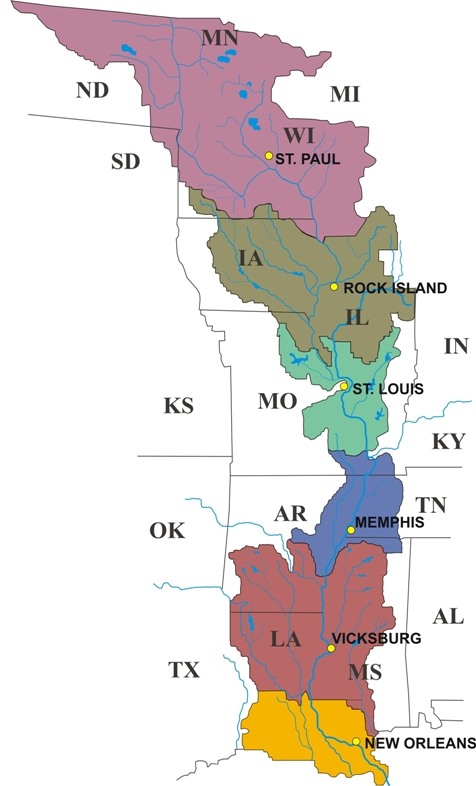
The Six Districts of the Mississippi Valley Division

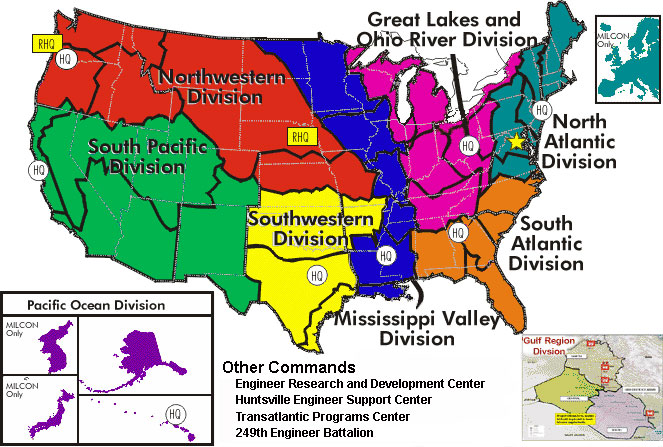
USACE Mississippi Valley Division, shown in blue

The United States Army Corps of Engineers Mississippi Valley Division (MVD) is responsible for the Corps water resources programs within 370,000-square-miles of the Mississippi River Valley, as well as the watershed portions of the Red River of the North that are within the United States. It encompasses the entire Mississippi River from Lake Itasca, Minnesota, to the Gulf of Mexico. It excludes the watersheds of the Missouri River and Ohio River, and portions of the Arkansas River and the Red River of the South. The division includes all or parts of 13 states: Arkansas, Illinois, Iowa, Kentucky, Louisiana, Michigan, Minnesota, Mississippi, Missouri, North Dakota, Tennessee, Wisconsin, and South Dakota.

The mission of the division is to serve the Mississippi Valley region by managing the watersheds and developing collaborative engineering solutions that will reduce risks through the reduction of flood damage potential, maintain and enhance navigation, and protect, restore and enhance environmental ecosystems, while being prepared to respond to regional and national emergencies.

The MVD operates hydroelectric plants within the system, is a large water and construction regulatory body, and maintains over 1.9 million acres for recreation. The MVD, and specifically the New Orleans District, is responsible for the design and construction of the Hurricane & Storm Damage Risk Reduction System (HSDRRS) which seeks to provide 100 Year storm protection to the City of New Orleans.

== Overview ==
The Mississippi Valley Division is made up of six districts, based in St. Paul, Minnesota, Rock Island, Illinois, St. Louis, Missouri, Memphis, Tennessee, Vicksburg, Mississippi, and New Orleans, Louisiana.

The Division Commander is directly responsible to the Chief of Engineers. Within the authorities delegated, MVD Commander directs and supervises the individual District Commanders. MVD duties include preparing engineering studies and design, constructing, operating, and maintaining flood control and river and harbor facilities and installations, administering the laws on civil works activities, acquiring, managing, and disposing of real estate, and mobilization support of military, natural disaster, and national emergency operations.

== Mississippi River Commission ==
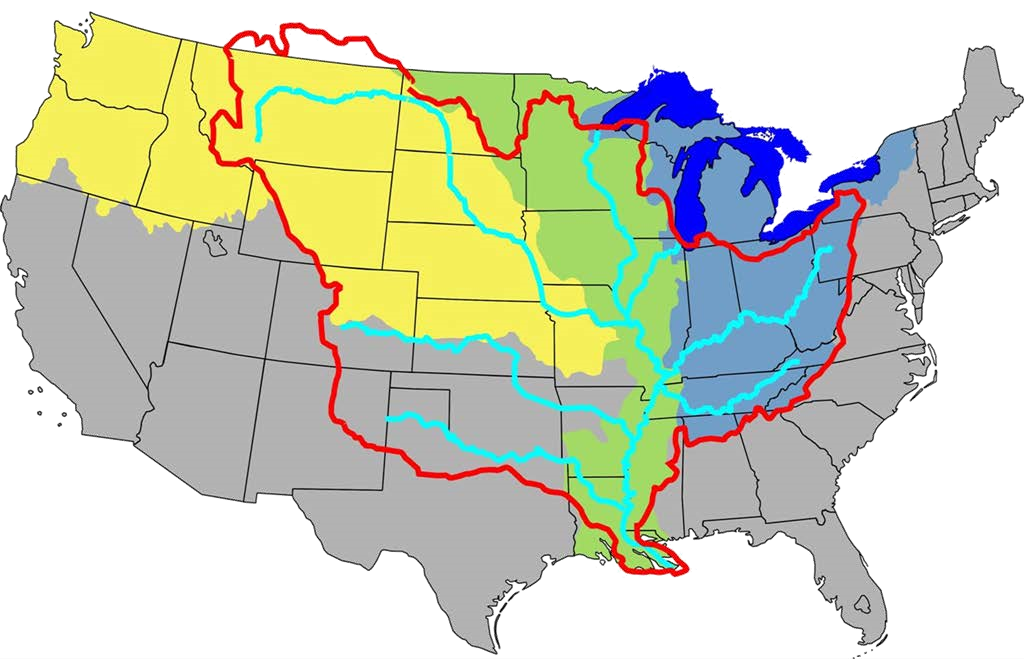
The MRC Area of Jurisdiction outlined in red

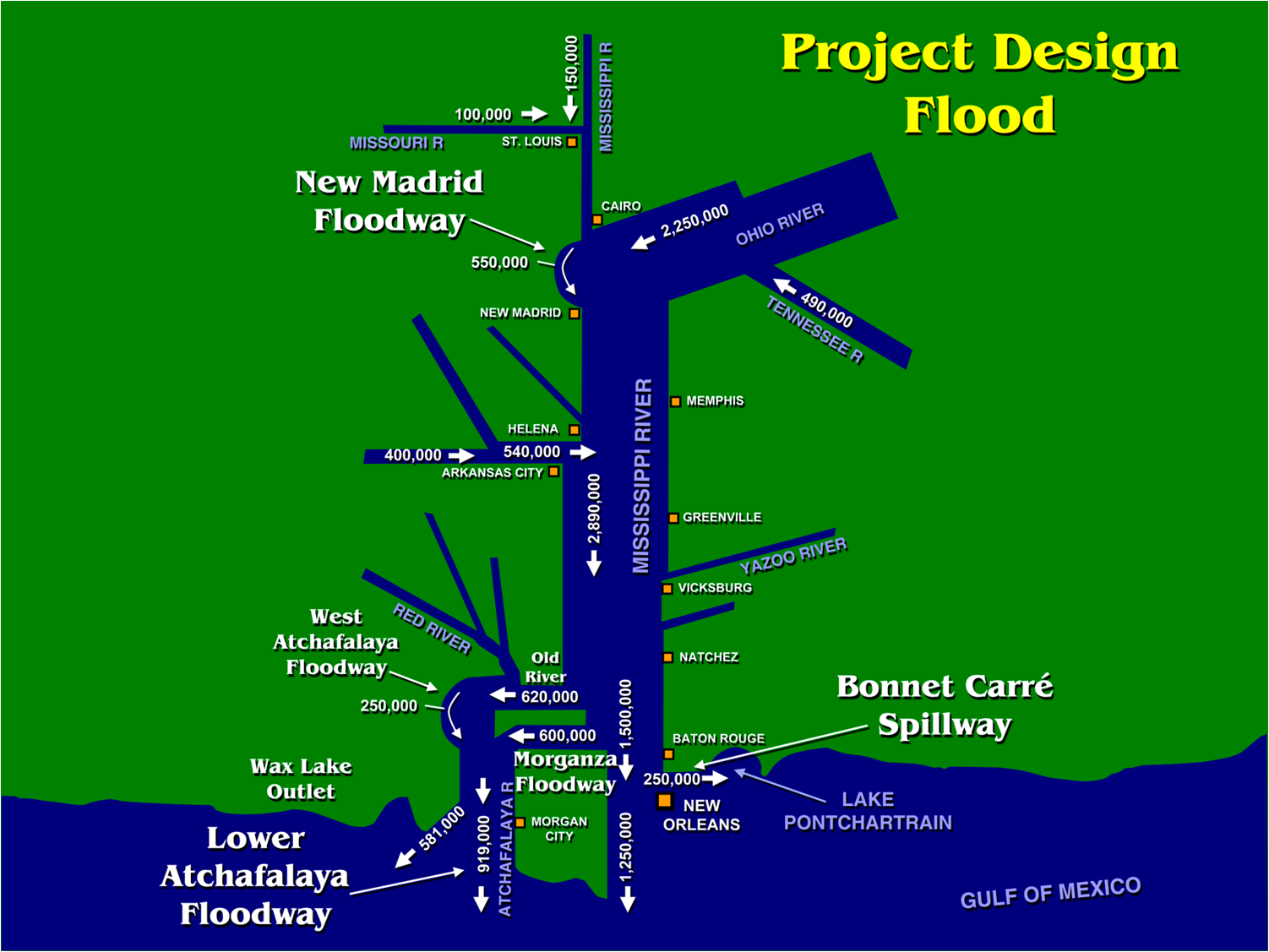
The MR&T Project Design Flood

The Mississippi River Commission was established in 1879 to facilitate improvement of the Mississippi River from the Head of Passes near its mouth to its headwaters. The stated mission of the commission was to develop and implement plans to correct, permanently locate, and deepen the channel of the Mississippi River, improve safety and ease of navigation, prevent destructive floods. and promote and facilitate commerce, trade, and the postal service.

For nearly a half century, the MRC functioned as an executive body reporting directly to the U.S. Secretary of War. The Great Mississippi Flood of 1927 changed the mission of the MRC. The consequent Flood Control Act of 1928 created the Mississippi River and Tributaries Project (MR&T). The act assigned responsibility for developing and implementing the Mississippi River and Tributaries Project (MR&T) to the Mississippi River Commission.

The MR&T project provides for control of floods of the Mississippi River from Head of Passes to the vicinity of Cape Girardeau, Missouri, control of floods of the tributaries and outlets of the Mississippi River as they are affected by its backwaters, and improvement for navigation of the Mississippi River from Baton Rouge, Louisiana, to Cairo, Illinois. This includes improvements to certain harbors and improvement for navigation of the Old and Atchafalaya Rivers from the Mississippi River to Morgan City, Louisiana.

It also includes bank stabilization of the Mississippi River from the Head of Passes to Cairo, Illinois, preservation, restoration, and enhancement of environmental resources, including but not limited to measures for fish and wildlife, increased water supplies, recreation, cultural resources, and other related water resources development programs, and semi-annual inspection trips to observe river conditions and facilitate coordination with local interests in implementation of projects. For over a century the inspections and hearings have been held aboard the M/V Mississippi and its predecessors.

There are seven members on the commission. The current President of the Mississippi River Commission is U.S. Army Corps of Engineers Major General Diana M. Holland. The mission is executed through the United States Army Corps of Engineers Mississippi Valley Division Districts in St. Paul, Rock Island, St. Louis, Memphis, Vicksburg, and New Orleans.

The headquarters of the operation is in Historic Downtown Vicksburg in the Mississippi River Commission Building.

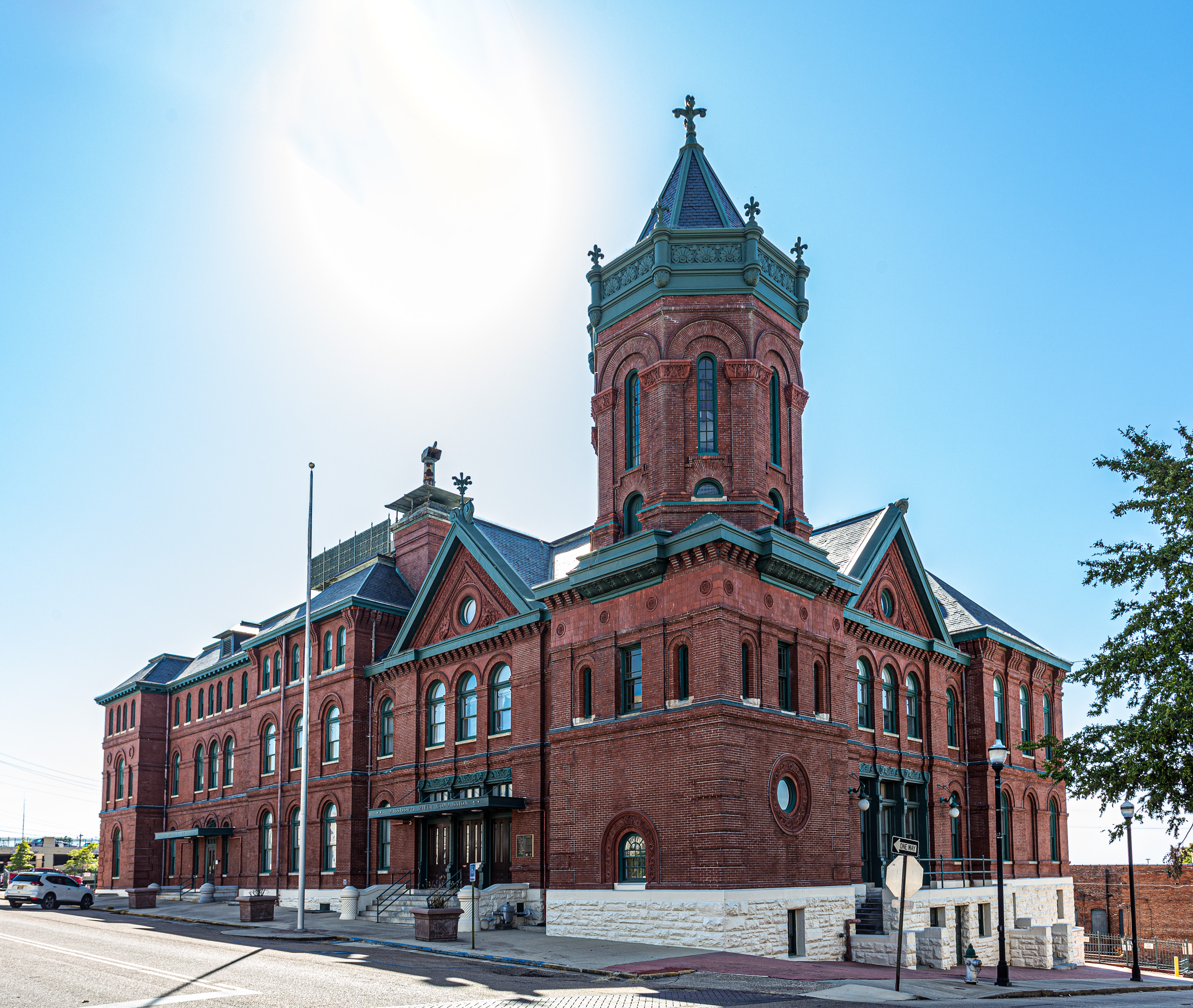
The Mississippi River Commission building in Vicksburg

== See also ==
- List of locks and dams of the Upper Mississippi River
- List of navigation authorities in the United States
