= Sutherlin High School =

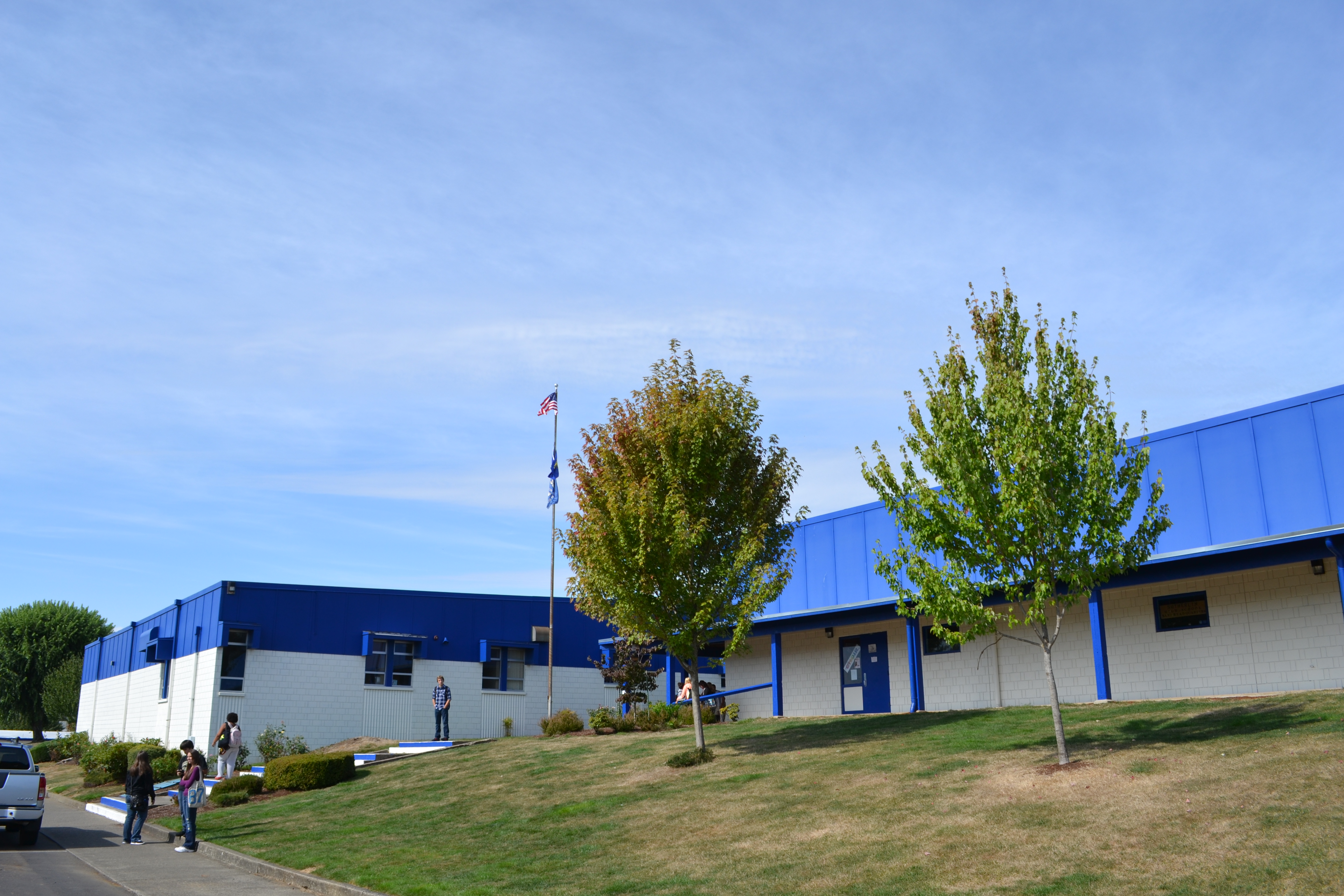

Location
- 500 E 4th Avenue; Sutherlin, (Douglas County), Oregon 97479; United States; 43.394867°N 123.307221°W

Information
- Type: Public
- School district: Sutherlin School District
- Superintendent: Terri Prestianni
- Principal: Kevin Hunt
- Teaching staff: 23.14 (FTE)
- Grades: 9-12
- Enrollment: 355 (2017–18)
- Student to teacher ratio: 15.34
- Colors: Blue and white
- Athletics conference: OSAA Sky-Em League 3A-5
- Mascot: Bulldog
- Website: https://www.sutherlin.k12.or.us/o/shs

Sutherlin High School is a public high school located in Sutherlin, Oregon, United States.

== Academics ==
In 2008, 76% of the school's seniors received their high school diploma. Of 120 students, 91 graduated, 20 dropped out, two received a modified diploma, and seven were still in high school the following year.

== Notable alumni ==
- Steve M. Thompson, member of the Alaska House of Representatives from Fairbanks since 2011; mayor of Fairbanks, 2001–2007
- Ralph A. Tudor, engineer and United States Under Secretary of the Interior, 1953–1954
