= One Mississippi =

One Mississippi may refer to:

- One Mississippi (Brendan Benson album), 1996
- One Mississippi (J Church album), 2000
- One Mississippi (TV series), a 2016 American television series
- "One Mississippi" (Kane Brown song), 2021
- "One Mississippi" (Steve Azar song), 2020
- "One Mississippi", a song on the 2003 album Jillbilly by Jill King
- "One Mississippi", a song on the 2013 album Bring You Back by Brett Eldredge
- "One Mississippi", a song on the 2017 album So Good by Zara Larsson
- One Mississippi, the start of a counting sequence (e.g. one Mississippi, two Mississippi, etc.) sometimes used to approximately measure a number of seconds, such as in American street football

== See also ==
- Mississippi (disambiguation)
