= Mississippian =

Mississippian may refer to:

- Mississippian (geology), a subperiod of the Carboniferous period in the geologic timescale, roughly 360 to 325 million years ago
- Mississippian period (archaeology), an archaeological culture or period across the Midwest and the Southeastern United States that flourished between 1000 and 1600
- Mississippian Railway, a short-line railroad
- relating to the state of Mississippi

== See also ==
- Mississippi (disambiguation)
