= SS Mississippi =

SS Mississippi may refer to the following steamships named Mississippi:

- SS Mississippi (1862), a screw steamer also known as USS Memphis
- SS Mississippi (1890), a combination cargo/passenger ship later renamed as USAT Buford
- SS Mississippi (1902), a cargo ship later renamed as SS Samland

== See also ==
- Mississippi (disambiguation) § Ships
