= Mississippi Township =

Mississippi Township may refer to:

- Mississippi Township, Crittenden County, Arkansas, in Crittenden County, Arkansas
- Mississippi Township, Desha County, Arkansas, in Desha County, Arkansas
- Mississippi Township, Sebastian County, Arkansas, in Sebastian County, Arkansas
- Mississippi Township, Jersey County, Illinois
- Mississippi Township, Mississippi County, Missouri
