= Society of American Military Engineers =

- Logo
- Abbreviation: SAME
- Formation: March 1, 1920 (106 years ago)
- Founder: Maj. Gen. William M. Black
- Founded at: Washington, D.C.
- Type: 501(c)(3), professional association
- Purpose: Further the principles of national defense
- Headquarters: 1420 King Street, Suite 100, Alexandria, Virginia
- Coordinates: 38.80610°N 77.05540°W
- Region served: Worldwide
- Members: 26,030 (2022)
- Key people: Executive Director; Maj. Gen. Mike Wehr
- Publication: The Military Engineer
- Website: same.org

The Society of American Military Engineers (SAME) unites public and private sector individuals and organizations from across the architecture, engineering, construction, environmental, facility management, contracting and acquisition fields and related disciplines in support of the United States' national security.

SAME connects architects, engineers and builders in the public sector and private industry, uniting them to improve individual and collective capabilities to provide the capability and prepare for and overcome natural and man-made disasters, acts of terrorism and to improve security at home and abroad.

That goal grew from America's experiences in World War I in which more than 11,000 civilian engineers were called to duty upon the United States entering the conflict. Returning home after "the war to end war," many feared the sector would lose this collective knowledge and the cooperation between public and private sectors that proved vital to combat success. Industry and military leaders vowed to capitalize on the technical lessons and camaraderie shared during their battlefield experiences.

== History ==
In 1919, Major General William M. Black, Chief of Engineers, appointed a nine-officer board to consider the formation of an "association of engineers" that would preserve, and expand upon, connections formed in war and promote the advancement of engineering and its related professions. Early in 1920, the first SAME posts were established, providing former colleagues and new engineers opportunities to connect face-to-face, and establishing post-to-community relationships across the United States.

The original nine-member board appointed by General Black also arranged the donation of Professional Memoirs, a magazine published by the Engineer Bureau since 1909, and its assets, to SAME with the blessing of General of the Armies John J. Pershing. Those memoirs were subsequently renamed The Military Engineer, which has been continuously published since it debuted in 1920.

United States Vice President Charles G. Dawes served as SAME's 8th president. The year before assuming his role as president of SAME, Dawes was awarded the 1925 Nobel Peace Prize for his work on German reparations in 1924.

Due to its close ties with the uniformed services of the United States, several branches of the military and the Public Health Service allow its members to wear the SAME ribbon on the uniform after all military and foreign decorations and awards. Colonel, and University president Blake R. Van Leer was also a member.

== Governance ==
Headquartered in Alexandria, Virginia, SAME provides its more than 25,000 members extensive opportunities for industry-government engagement, training, education and professional development through a robust offering of conferences, workshops, networking events and publications. With a membership that includes recent service academy graduates and retired engineering officers, project managers and corporate executives, uniformed and public sector professionals and private sector experts, SAME bridges the gaps between critical stakeholders to help secure our nation.

SAME consists of 95 Posts and more than 30 student chapters and field chapters around the world along with a national office staff. Nationally, the organization is led by a volunteer board of direction that comprises six national officers, 18 regional vice presidents, the chairs of the Mission Committees & Councils and 12 elected directors who serve three-year terms and are elected in groups of four annually.

SAME membership is open to anyone in the U.S. and abroad.

== See also ==
- Goethals Medal
