= South Atlantic Division =

One of the eight permanent divisions of the U.S. Army Corps of Engineers

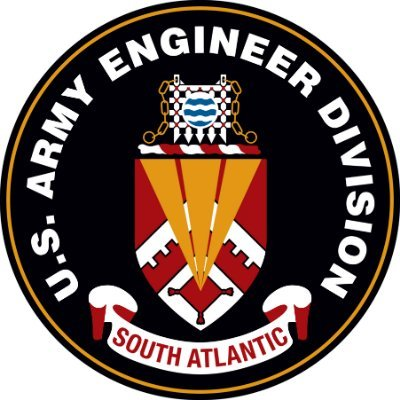
Division emblem

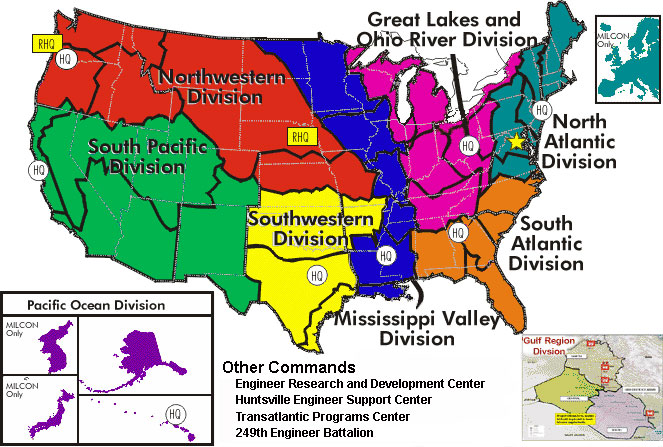
USACE South Atlantic Division, shown in orange

The United States Army Corps of Engineers South Atlantic Division (SAD) is one of the eight permanent divisions of the Army organization, providing civil works and military water resource services/infrastructure. It also supports economically viable and environmentally sustainable watershed management and water resources development in its territory.

The Division, headquartered in Atlanta, stretches from North Carolina to Alabama as well as the Caribbean, and Central and South America. It covers all or parts of six states. One-third of the stateside Army and one-fifth of the stateside Air Force are located within the division boundaries. The largest single environmental restoration project in the world — the Everglades Restoration — is managed by SAD.

The Division Commander is directly responsible to the Chief of Engineers. The SAD Commander directs and supervises the individual District Commanders.

SAD duties include:

- Preparing engineering studies and design.
- Constructing, operating, and maintaining flood control and river and harbor facilities and installations.
- Administering the laws on civil works activities.
- Acquiring, managing, and disposing of real estate.
- Mobilization support of military, natural disaster, and national emergency operations.

== Districts ==
The Division's five districts are headquartered in:

South Atlantic Division

Jacksonville District

Charleston District

Mobile District

Savannah District

Wilmington District

- Wilmington, North Carolina
- Charleston, South Carolina
- Savannah, Georgia
- Jacksonville, Florida
- Mobile, Alabama
- Atlanta, Georgia
