= MV Mississippi =

United States Army river boat

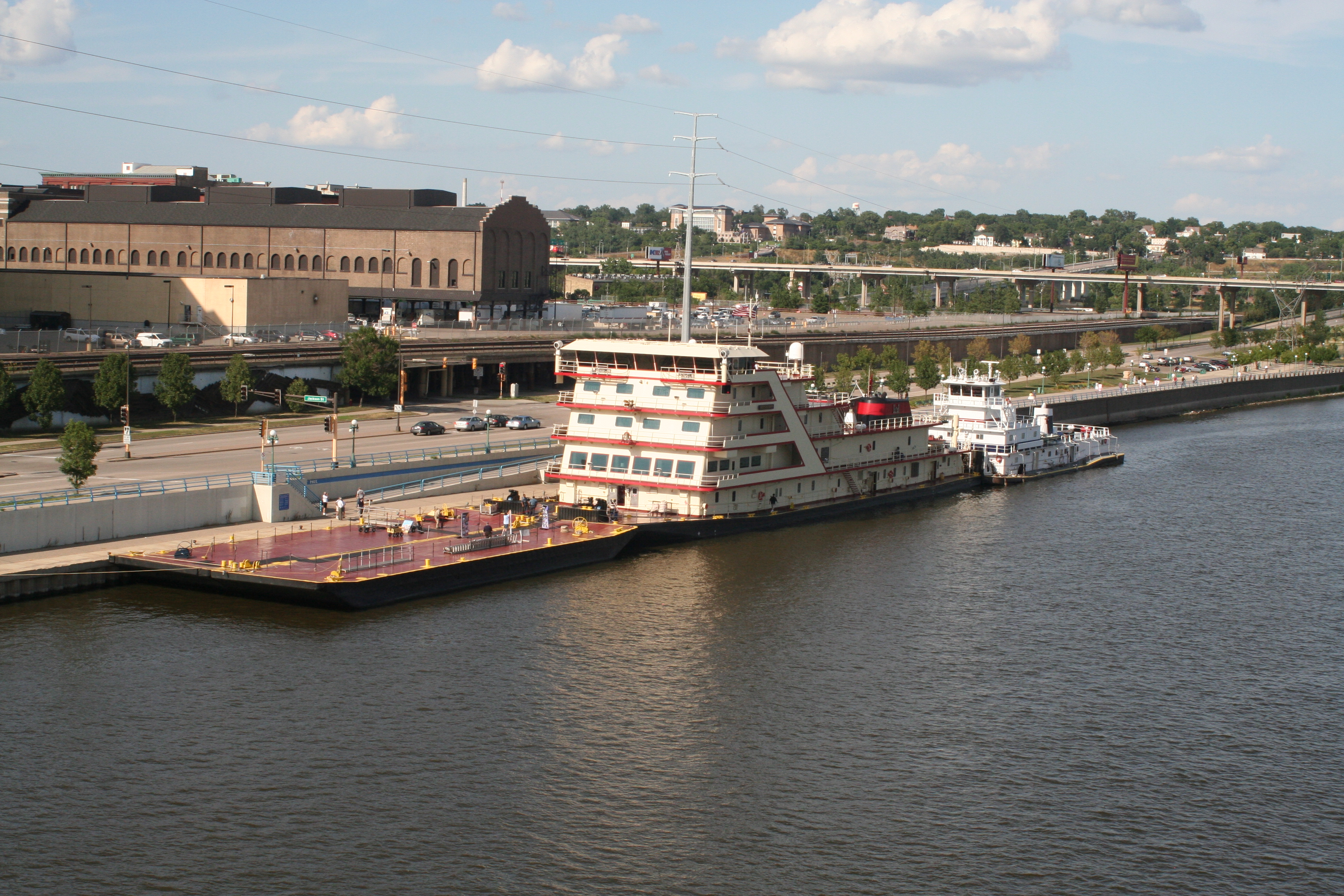
- On left, with barge used to reduce bow wave.

History
- Name: Mississippi (V)
- Owner: United States Army Corps of Engineers
- Port of registry: Memphis, Tennessee
- Builder: VT Halter Marine, Inc., Moss Point, MS
- Laid down: March 31, 1992
- Completed: 1993
- Identification: MMSI number: 369994000; Callsign: AEUI
- Status: In service

General characteristics
- Tonnage: 2600 tons
- Displacement: 2135 tons
- Length: 241 ft (73 m)
- Beam: 58 ft (18 m)
- Height: 52 ft 1 1/2 in (15.888 m)
- Draft: 8 ft (2.4 m)
- Depth: 12 ft (3.7 m)
- Installed power: 3 General Motors LM7/5.3L diesels at 545 kW (731 hp)
- Propulsion: 3 Caterpillar 3606 diesels (6276 hp. total) turning 3 5-blade 93-inch-diameter (2,400 mm) propellers
- Speed: 15 mph (24 km/h); 8 mph (13 km/h) with tow
- Crew: 741

MV Mississippi is a United States Army Corps of Engineers (USACE) towboat operating on the Mississippi River. It is the largest diesel towboat on the river.

== Working boat ==
MV Mississippi is a working towboat for the USACE Memphis District of the Mississippi Valley Division. Ninety percent of the time it is moving barges, equipment and supplies in support of mat-sinking operations. It also serves as an inspection boat for the Mississippi River Commission (MRC) during a high- and low-water inspection trip each year. Commissioners hold meetings at river towns in the boat's hearing room, which can seat 115 people. Its dining room has a capacity of 85 people. The boat has 22 staterooms and can handle 150 passengers. The Corps also uses it as a "giant floating ambassador".

During the Hurricane Katrina crisis, Mississippi was moved to Vicksburg, Mississippi, and used as a floating command center.

== Predecessors ==
There have been five USACE vessels of this name.

=== Mississippi ===
Steamer Mississippi was built in St. Louis in 1882. It was used by the MRC for its spring and fall inspection trips from St. Louis to New Orleans, Louisiana. In 1919 it was renamed Piomingo (for the historic Chickasaw chief Piomingo), after being transferred to what is now the Memphis District, where it served as a towboat for many more years.

=== Mississippi II ===
Steamer Leota was built in 1899 as a dredge tender. Selected in 1920 as the new MRC inspection vessel, two years later it was rebuilt and re-designated Mississippi.

=== Mississippi III ===
- MISSISSIPPI III
- U.S. National Register of Historic Places
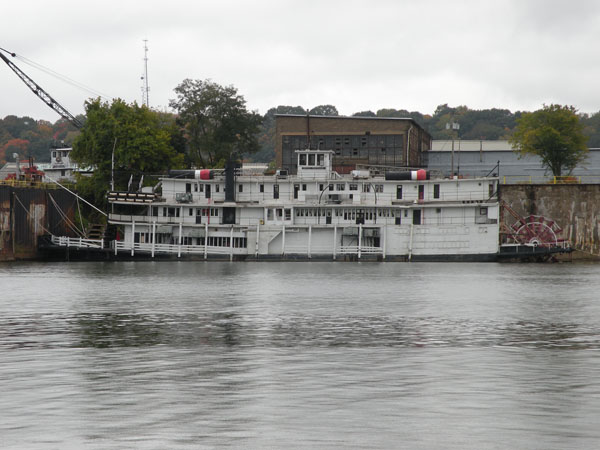
- Becky Thatcher docked on Neville Island near Pittsburgh, Pennsylvania, October 17, 2009

- Location within Pennsylvania
- Location: Final location was Neville Island, Pennsylvania
- Coordinates: 40°30′43.56″N 80°7′12.36″W
- Area: less than one acre
- Built: 1926
- Architect: U.S.Army Corps of Engineers
- Architectural style: Texas-deck sternwheeler
- NRHP reference No.: 83002066
- Added to NRHP: September 21, 1983

Steamer Mississippi was a sternwheel, steam driven boat that was based upon the Mississippi II. After Mississippi II's hull and machinery were determined to no longer be serviceable in 1926, a new hull, boilers, and engines were built at Jeffersonville, Indiana. In 1927, the cabin from its predecessor was moved atop the new hull at Paducah, Kentucky. Used for inspecting and surveying along rivers, the boat continued in service until April 1961, when the USACE decommissioned it at Memphis, Tennessee. Converted to a museum and restaurant, it was in Saint Louis, Missouri, until 1975. While in Missouri, it was renamed Becky Thatcher, after the character in Mark Twain's The Adventures of Tom Sawyer. It was then moved to Marietta, Ohio, where it was the Showboat Becky Thatcher restaurant and theater in 1975. The boat was purchased by a group of interested citizens who planned to bring her to Marietta as part of the Bicentennial project. Those citizens formed a not-for-profit corporation, the Ohio Showboat Drama Inc., and in the summer of 1976, the musical Showboat was performed as part of the town's U.S Bicentennial celebration, by the Mid-Ohio Valley Players on the decks and an adjacent barge with 3,000 people watching from the shore. The boat was permanently moored on the Muskingum River, near where the mouth meets the Ohio River. Becky Thatcher was entered into the National Register of Historic Places by the National Park Service in September 1983.

In 1984, the boat sank during a spring flood with heavy damage to her hull and superstructure, but she was raised and returned after repairs for the 1985 season. The theater operated until 2006. It was evicted from there by the City of Marietta and moved to Neville Island near Pittsburgh, Pennsylvania, on October 17, 2009. The boat was of particular interest because it was the last of the texas-deck sternwheelers. It was added to the National Register of Historic Places on September 21, 1983. On the night of February 19, 2010, during severe winter weather conditions, the showboat Becky Thatcher sank at its mooring on Neville Island in the Ohio River. Demolition of the boat began on Monday, March 8, 2010. It was completely demolished and destroyed not long after that.

=== Mississippi IV ===
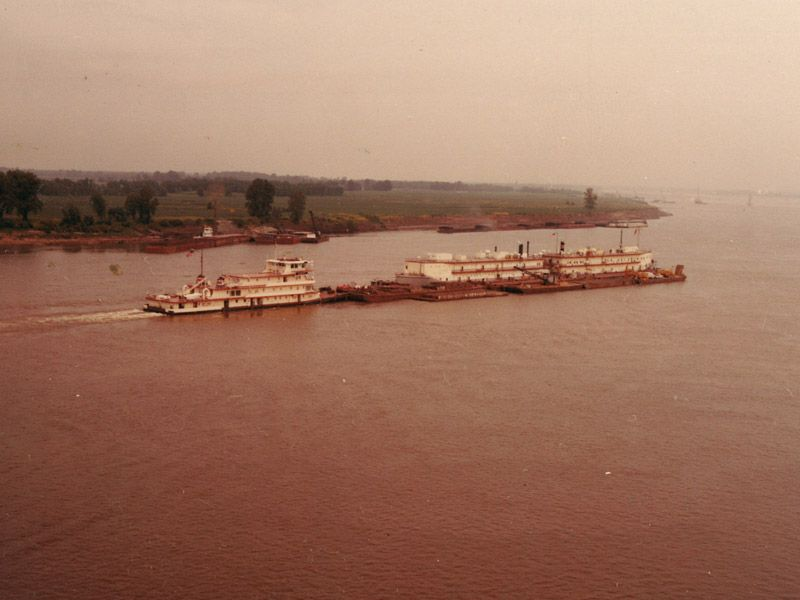
Motor Vessel Mississippi IV

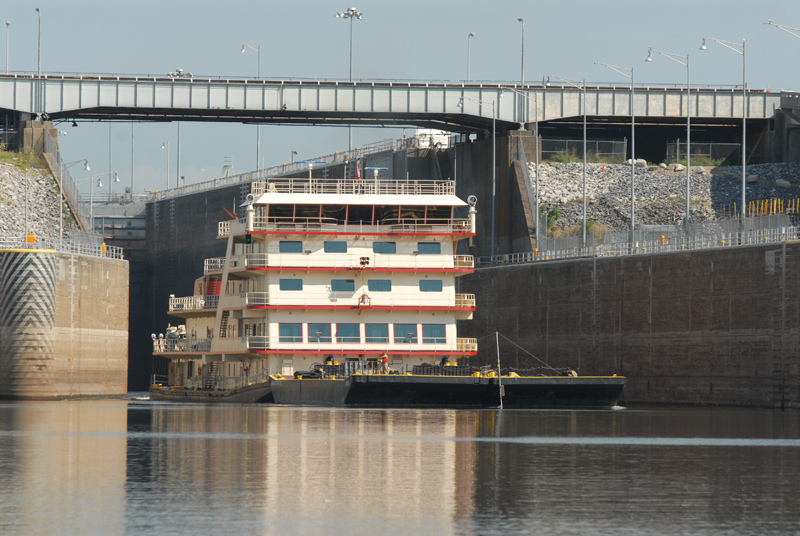
Mississippi in the Kentucky Lock on the Tennessee River, August 11, 2011

Motor Vessel Mississippi was a diesel-powered vessel with an all-steel superstructure. Powered by two 8-cylinder engines, for a total of 3720 horsepower, for extra maneuverability it used controllable pitch propellers which allowed it to generate a reverse thrust of over 70% in the forward direction. The four levels on the superstructure were the main deckhouse, second deckhouse, Texas deckhouse, and the pilothouse. It served as a towboat and inspection vessel until decommissioned in 1993. On September 26, 2007, it was moved to its permanent location on land at the Lower Mississippi River Museum in Vicksburg, Mississippi.

== See also ==
- Mississippi Valley Division
- Mississippi River Commission
