= Dahomey Expedition commemorative medal 1892 =

French campaign commemorative medal

Dahomey Expedition commemorative medal
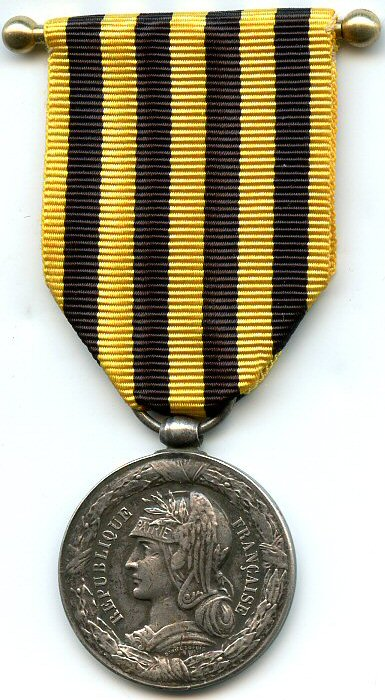
- Dahomey Expedition commemorative medal (obverse)
- Type: Campaign medal
- Awarded for: Service in French Colonial Dahomean wars
- Country: France
- Campaigns: First Franco-Dahomean War; Second Franco-Dahomean War
- Established: 24 November 1892
- First award: 11 May 1893
- Final award: 5 February 1894
- Ribbon bar of the Dahomey Expedition commemorative medal

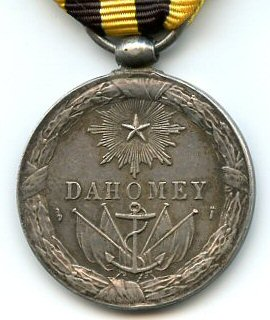
Reverse of the Dahomey Expedition commemorative medal

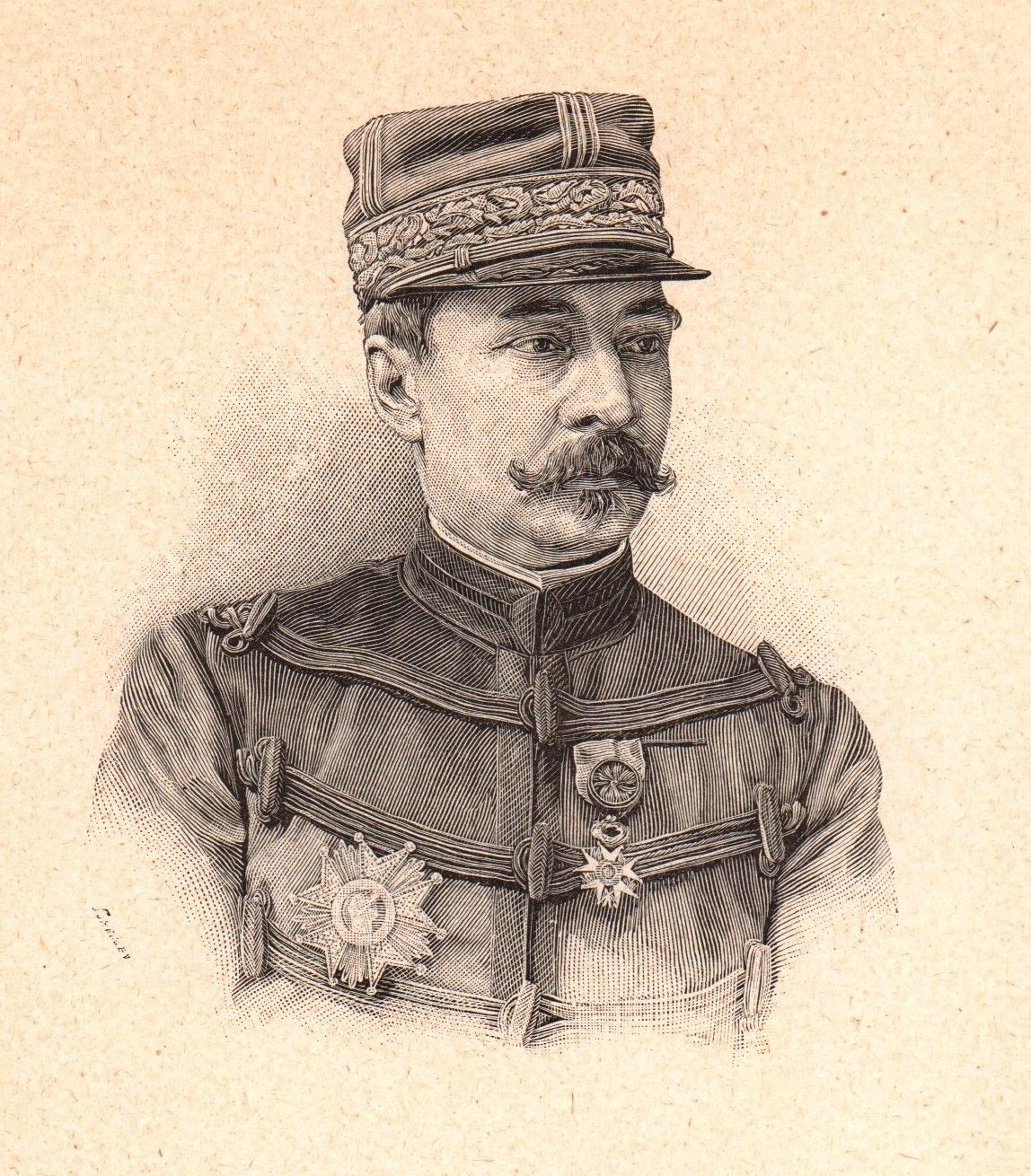
Colonel Alfred-Amédée Dodds, a recipient of the Dahomey Expedition commemorative medal

The Dahomey Expedition commemorative medal (French: Médaille commémorative de l'Expédition du Dahomey) was a French campaign commemorative medal. It was bestowed to the participants of the First Franco-Dahomean War (1890) and of the Second Franco-Dahomean War (1892–1894) in order to commemorate their feats of arms.

In 1892, France decided to send an expeditionary force of 1,801 Europeans and 1,769 natives under the command of Marine Infantry Colonel Alfred Dodds in response to the harassment of the kingdom of Porto-Novo under its protectorate and its trading posts on the coast of Dahomey by the troops of Behanzin, the king of Abomey.

The troops taking part in this expedition, which lasted five months, defeated the 12,000 warrior strong army (including the 2000 women strong Corps of amazons) of Behanzin at Dogba. France thus reconquered the kingdom of Dahomey (now the Republic of Benin) and placed at its head, Toffa as the king of Porto-Novo. King Behanzin was captured in 1893 and deported to Martinique then to Algiers where he died in 1906.

The Law of 24 November 1892 instituted the Commemorative Medal of the Dahomey Expedition for award to the officers, sailors and soldiers who took part in this campaign.

== Award statute ==
The Dahomey Expedition commemorative medal was awarded by the President of France on propositions by the minister responsible for the service in which the recipient served. It was awarded to all officers, sailors and soldiers who served in the Dahomey campaigns.

All recipients were to adhere to the code of conduct as set under the Grand chancellor of the Legion of honour.

Posthumous awards were made to the widow or parents of the recipient.

No request for the medal may be made fore service rendered after 5 February 1894.

The crews of the following vessels of the French Navy were eligible for the award of the Dahomey Expedition commemorative medal:

- AMBRE (1 January to 1 March 1894)
- BRANDON (1 January to 12 February 1894)
- ÉMERAUDE (1 January to 1 March 1894)
- MARMET (1 January to 1 March 1894)
- MÉSANGE (1 January to 1 March 1894)
- ONYX (1 January to 1 March 1894)
- OPALE (1 January to 1 March 1894)
- SEGOND (1 January to 11 February 1894)
- TOPAZE (1 January to 1 March 1894)

== Award description ==
The Dahomey Expedition commemorative medal was a 30 mm in diameter silver medal, its design was from Jean-Baptiste Daniel-Dupuis. The obverse of the medal features an effigy of the Republic and the words RÉPUBLIQUE FRANÇAISE (English: FRENCH REPUBLIC) enclosed within a laurel wreath running along the entire circumference. In accordance with convention, the Republic is represented as a helmeted young woman with the word PATRIE (English: HOMELAND) inscribed on the visor of her helmet.

The reverse of the medal featured, within the same laurel wreath as on the obverse, in the upper section, a small five pointed star amid protruding rays, at centre the relief inscription "DAHOMEY", in the lower section, a naval sea anchor over four flags. A small relief Cornucopia trademark is just off the tip of the leftmost flag.

The medal hung from a 36 mm wide "daffodil yellow" silk moiré ribbon bearing four equidistant 4 mm black vertical stripes.

== Notable recipients (partial list) ==
- Colonel Alfred-Amédée Dodds
- Captain Joseph Gaudérique Aymerich
- Lieutenant Antoine Gramat

== See also ==
- First Franco-Dahomean War
- Second Franco-Dahomean War
- French Dahomey
- Benin
