= Battle of Atchoukpa =

Last major engagement of the First Franco-Dahomean War

- Part of the First Franco-Dahomean War
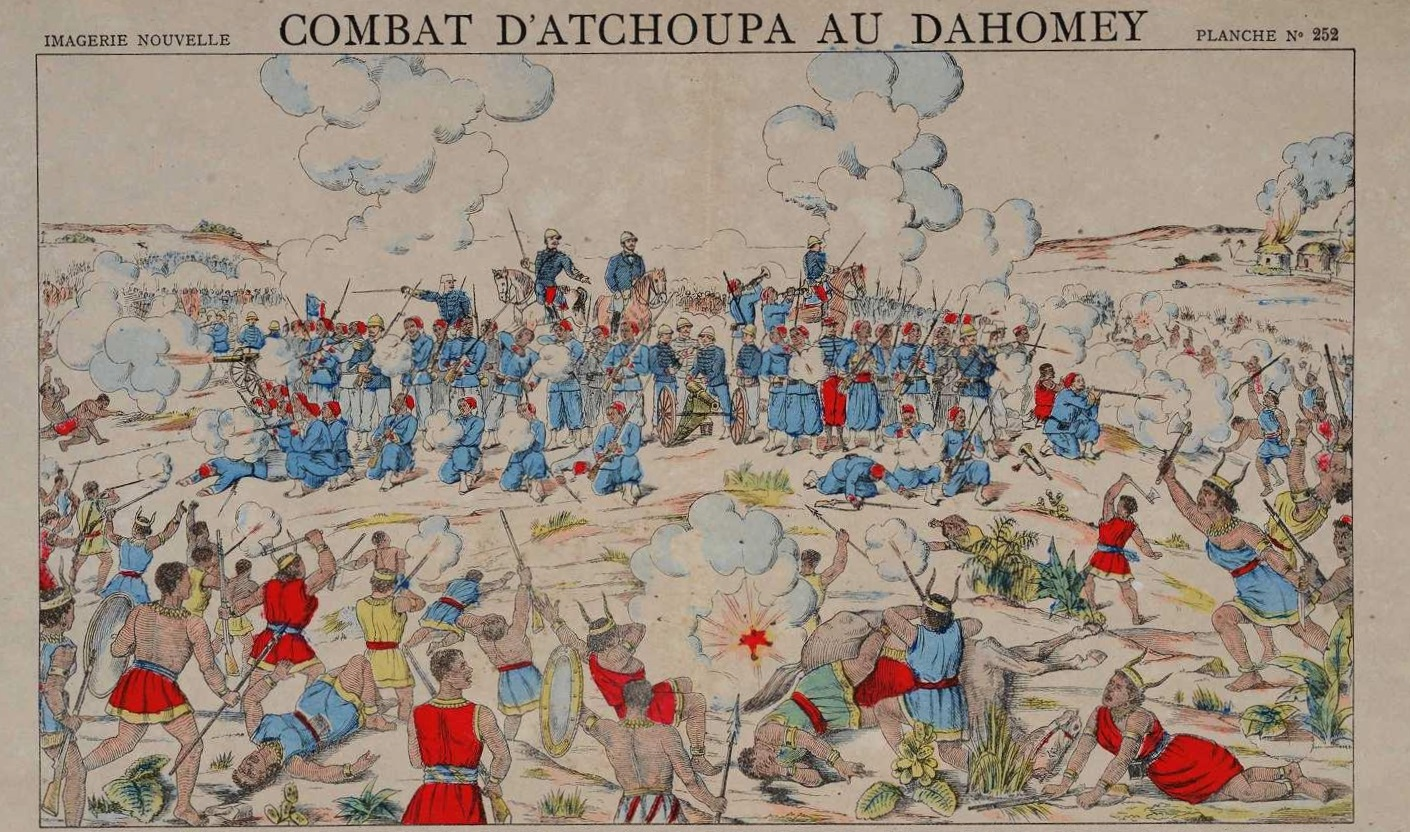
Date	20 April 1890
Location	Atchoukpa, present-day Benin
Result	French victory Béhanzin abandons his plans to attack Porto-Novo

Belligerents
France; Porto-Novo	Dahomey

Commanders and leaders
Sébastien Terrillon	Béhanzin

Strength
350 French troops 500 Porto-Novo warriors (fled early)	9,000 warriors

Casualties and losses
8 killed 53 wounded	1,500 killed or wounded

The Battle of Atchoukpa was fought on 20 April 1890 near the town of Atchoukpa during the First Franco-Dahomean War. A French force of 350 troops under Colonel Terrillon, briefly assisted by 500 of King Toffa I's warriors, fought off a force of 7,000 Dahomey warriors and 2,000 Dahomey Amazons under King Béhanzin who were set to march on Porto-Novo.

The Battle of Atchoukpa was the last major engagement of the First Franco-Dahomean War.

== Background ==
The First Franco-Dahomean War had technically began on 21 April 1890 when the French arrested several Dahomey officials in Cotonou as a result of Dahomey attacks on the French protectorate of Porto-Novo. On 4 March, a massive Dahomey attack of Cotonou was repulsed after a bloody battle.

On 15 April 1890, King Béhanzin's army crossed the Ouémé River. Burning down many villages on their path, they marched toward Porto-Novo and eventually set camp a few miles north from the city.

On 20 April at 6:00 a.m., a French column of 350 men, composed of Troupes de marines and Senegalese Tirailleurs companies, set off from Porto-Novo to face the Dahomey army. They were accompanied by 500 local Porto-Novo warriors.

== Battle ==
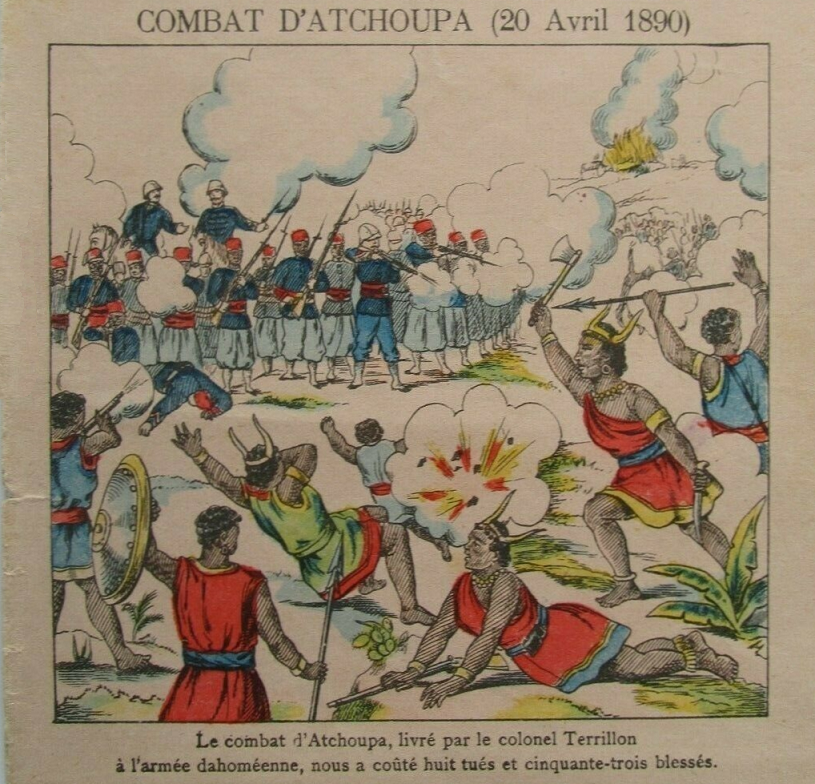
Dahomey warriors clashing with French squares

A little after 7:30 a.m., King Toffa I's warriors, who were marching ahead of the French column, came under Dahomey fire at the entrance of the village of Atchoukpa. The brief fusillade, which killed 8 of them and wounded many more, immediately sent them into a rout. The forwardmost French company, under Captain Arnoux, deployed itself to cover the retreat of Toffa's warriors as they ran in panic toward Porto-Novo. The Dahomey army came out of the village and directed itself toward the French, which prompted Colonel Terrillon to order his men to form infantry squares.

For over an hour, Béhanzin's army, composed of 7,000 warriors and 2,000 Dahomey Amazons, unsuccessfully clashed with French squares, through repeated charges. Superior French firepower and discipline kept each of their attacks at bay, inflicting upon them devastating casualties.

At around 9:00 a.m., King Béhanzin, seeing that his warriors were failing to inflict any damages on the French squares, took the decision to send a detachment to bypass them in order to burn down Porto-Novo while his main army kept the French engaged. However, Colonel Terrillon immediately took notice of the manoeuvre and ordered his squares to direct themselves toward the detachment. As soon as the Dahomey detachment came within firing range, the French unleashed a storm of bullets that instantly routed the Dahomey party.

The fighting went on for about another hour, as French squares kept slowly withdrawing toward Porto-Novo to ensure no further attempt to bypass them would occur. Near 10:00 a.m., Béhanzin finally ordered the retreat, giving up on his plans to attack Porto-Novo.

== Aftermath ==
French casualties amounted to 33 wounded: one officer, 15 white French troops and 17 Senegalese tirailleurs. King Toffa I's warriors had lost 8 killed and 20 wounded in their brief engagement at the beginning of the battle. Dahomey losses were much heavier, as they had lost over 1,500 killed or wounded in the fighting.

The Battle of Atchoukpa was the last major engagement of the First Franco-Dahomean War, and King Béhanzin would make no further attempts on Porto-Novo. On the next day, the French sent small reconnaissance parties that found out that all of Béhanzin's forces had left the surroundings of the city entirely and withdrawn beyond the Ouémé River.
