= Yaya Migansi =

Princess of Dahomey (1850–1932)

Yaya Migansi or Houekode (c. 1850–1932) was a princess of Dahomey, a kingdom in present-day Benin. Her father was Glele (died 1889), who was the 10th king of Dahomey from 1858 to 1889. Her mother was Miagbe, also known as Hoonon Magnitin who gave birth to three sets of twins with Glele; Migansi was the first-born of the eldest pair of twins. Her name was Houekode, and the epithet "Yaya", an affectionate term meaning "old woman" is thought to refer to her mother. As her father was the future king, she and her sister were married to the two leading ministers of the kingdom: the name "Migansi" means wife or dependant of the "Migan" or prime minister.

Migansi held the position of Na Daho, "eldest princess", one of the two chief offices within the royal family along with the Alodokponugan, the oldest brother of the king. She had a responsibility for the marital arrangements of her siblings and the choice of a successor to the king. When her father died in 1889, Migansi's brother Béhanzin succeeded to the throne but fled in 1892 after the French invaded and burnt the capital, Abomey. Migansi and the Alodokponugan were involved in negotiations with the French, during which one of them said that she: "a woman of mature age, of a remarkable intelligence, appeared to exercise a real influence on her brothers". Agreement was reached, and Yagansi performed the installation of the new king, Béhanzin's brother, who took the regnal name of Agoli-agbo, on 15 January 1894.

In 2022, L'événement Précis reported that a woman named Nan Nonfonkpa had claimed to be a descendant and heir of Glele, but her claim had been challenged by descendants of Yaya Migansi and her five siblings, the three pairs of twins.
