= First Franco-Dahomean War =

1890 conflict between France and Dahomey

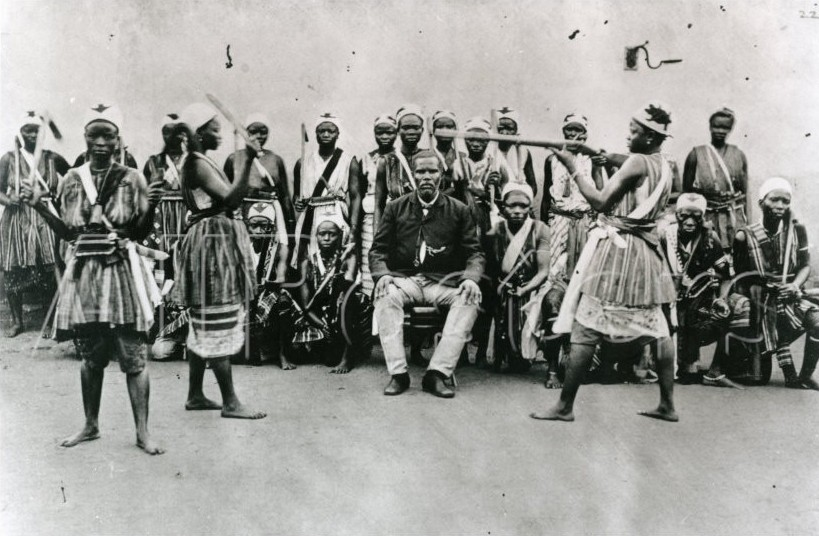
- Dahomey Amazons, c. 1890
Date	21 February – 4 October 1890
Location	Ouémé Department of modern Benin
Result	French victory

Belligerents
Dahomey	France: Porto-Novo

Commanders and leaders
(Dahomey) Béhanzin	(French Third Republic) Alfred-Amédée Dodds (French Third Republic) Sébastien Terrillon

Strength
Over 8,000 Fon troops	709–759 French troops 500 Porto-Novo troops

Casualties and losses
~1,600 killed or wounded	16 killed 83 wounded

The First Franco-Dahomean War was fought in 1890 between France, led by General Alfred-Amédée Dodds, and Dahomey under King Béhanzin.

== Background ==
At the close of the 19th century, European powers were busy conquering and colonising much of Africa. In what is today Benin, the main colonial power was the Third French Republic. The French had established commercial ties with the indigenous peoples of the area including one of West Africa's most powerful states at the time, the Fon kingdom of Dahomey. In 1851, a Franco-Dahomean friendship treaty was ratified allowing the French to operate commercially and missionaries to enter the country.

By 1890, the Fon kingdom of Dahomey was at the height of its power. It laid claim to almost all the coast of modern Benin plus much of south-central Benin as far north as Atcheribé. One of Dahomey's most important tributaries was the small kingdom of Porto-Novo near the coast. The kingdom had been at odds with Dahomey on and off since the middle of the 18th century.

In 1861, Porto-Novo was attacked by British anti-slaving ships. Porto-Novo asked for and received French protection in 1863, but this was rejected by Dahomey. Another issue of contention was the status of Cotonou, a port the French believed was under their control because of a treaty signed by Dahomey's representative in Whydah. Dahomey ignored all French claims there as well and continued to collect customs from the port.

== Cause of war ==
In 1874, King Toffa I took power in Porto-Novo and re-established French protection over the kingdom after Dahomey attacked it in 1882. Dahomey continued raiding the town, which culminated in an incident that brought the Fon and French into war. In March 1889, Dahomey attacked a village on the Ouémé where the chief was under the protection of the French. After remarking that the flag of the tricolour would protect him, the Fon commanded one of his Dahomey Amazons to behead him and wrap his head in the flag. Then in March of that year, France sent a mission to Dahomey's capital of Abomey to assert its claims to Cotonou and offer an annual payment. The crown prince and later king Béhanzin received the mission but nothing was achieved other than mutual distrust.

== Opening of hostilities ==
France responded to these events by building up its force in Cotonou to 359 men, 299 of which were Tirailleurs or French trained Senegalese and Gabonese. On 21 February, the French arrested the senior Fon officials in Cotonou and began fortifying the town. Skirmishes with local militia also broke out.

It was not long before word of this got back to Abomey. Dahomey sent a force straight to Cotonou with plans to bring it firmly back under Fon control once and for all.

== Battle of Cotonou ==
On 4 March, a Dahomey army of several thousand charged the log stockade around Cotonou at approximately 5 in the morning. This was usual for the Fon army of Dahomey that almost always marched at night and attacked just before dawn. Prying apart the stakes and shoving their muskets through, the Fon fired into the enclosure.

Some managed to surmount the 800-metre perimeter inflicting casualties within the walls. After four hours of intense fighting, often occurring hand-to-hand despite withering French firepower and even gunboat shells, the Fon force withdrew. The French sustained few losses, but the Fon suffered several hundred dead (129 within the French lines).

== Battle of Atchoukpa ==
After regrouping, Dahomey sent another force south, this time toward Porto-Novo. After receiving numerous reinforcements, the French ordered 350 men with three field guns to march north and intercept the Fon. This time, the French would be assisted by 500 warriors of King Toffa I. As the French column arrived to the village of Atchoukpa, Toffa's warriors, who were walking ahead of the formation, came under Dahomey fire and fled the battlefield in a complete rout.

The French formed infantry squares and held repeated Dahomey attacks for several hours. An attempt by King Béhanzin to send a detachment to bypass the French squares and sack Porto-Novo was thwarted by Colonel Terrillon. French squares slowly withdrew toward the undefended city. After another hour of unsuccessful clashes with French squares, Béhanzin ordered his army to retreat. By the next day, the Dahomey army had completely left the vicinity of Porto-Novo and withdrawn toward Abomey.

== End of hostilities ==
Dahomey did not launch any further attacks on Cotonou or Porto-Novo. On 3 October 1890, Dahomey signed a treaty recognising the kingdom of Porto-Novo as a French protectorate. Béhanzin was also forced to cede Cotonou, but did receive 20,000 francs a year for giving up his customs rights. The war resulted in victory for France and left Dahomey defeated. Despite the treaty, both sides believed peace could not last and made preparations for another decisive encounter. Hostilities quickly resumed despite the treaty, escalating into the Second Franco-Dahomean War two years later.
