= Franco-Dahomean Wars =

The Franco-Dahomean Wars were a series of military conflicts including:

- First Franco-Dahomean War (1890), that pitted the Kingdom of Dahomey against the Third French Republic and its vassal kingdom of Porto-Novo
- Second Franco-Dahomean War (1892–1894), between Dahomey and France
