= Agoli-agbo =

Last King of Dahomey from 1894 to 1900

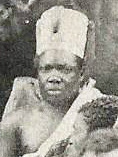
Agoli-Agbo.

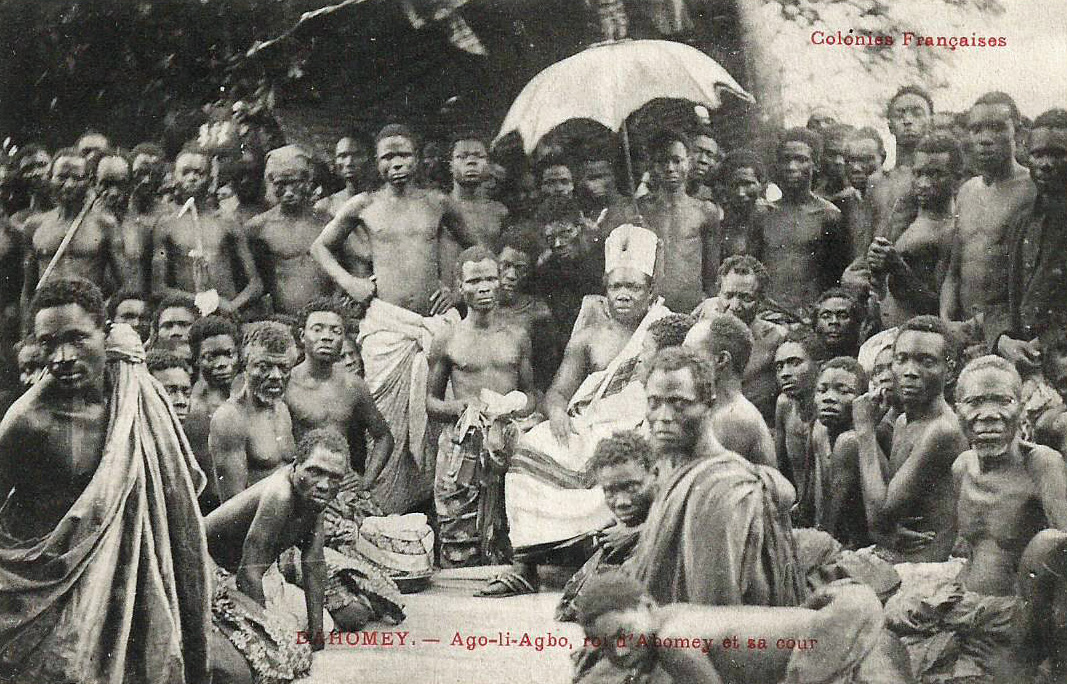
Agoli-agbo (center), before 1900.

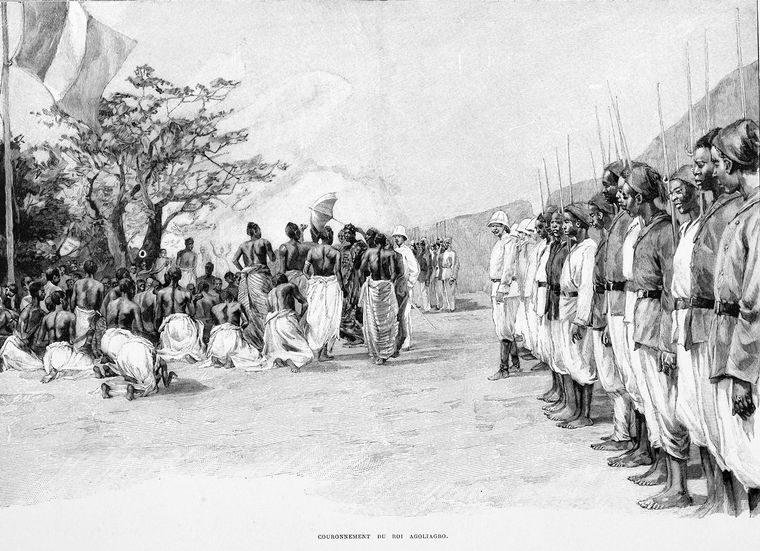
Coronation of Agoli-agbo, 1895.

Agoli-agbo was the twelfth and final King of Dahomey from 1894 to 1900.

== Biography ==
He took the throne after the previous king, Béhanzin, went into exile after being defeated in the invasion of Dahomey by France in the Second Franco-Dahomean War.

The exile of Béhanzin did not legalize the French colonization. The French general Alfred-Amédée Dodds offered the throne to every one of the immediate royal family, in return for a signature on a treaty establishing a French protectorate over the Kingdom; all refused.

Finally, on January 15, 1894, Béhanzin's Army Chief of Staff Prince Agoli-agbo (whose name meaning "the dynasty has not fallen"), brother of Béhanzin and son of King Glélé, signed. He was appointed to the throne, as a 'traditional chief' rather than head of state of a sovereign nation, by the French when he agreed to sign the instrument of surrender.

He 'reigned' for six years, assisted by a French Viceroy. The French prepared for direct administration, which they achieved on 12 February 1900. As the Indigénat exacerbated the exploitation, Agoli-agbo went into exile in Gabon.

In 1910, he was allowed to return and to live in the Save Region. He occasionally returned to Abomey in order to perform ancestor worship for the departed kings.

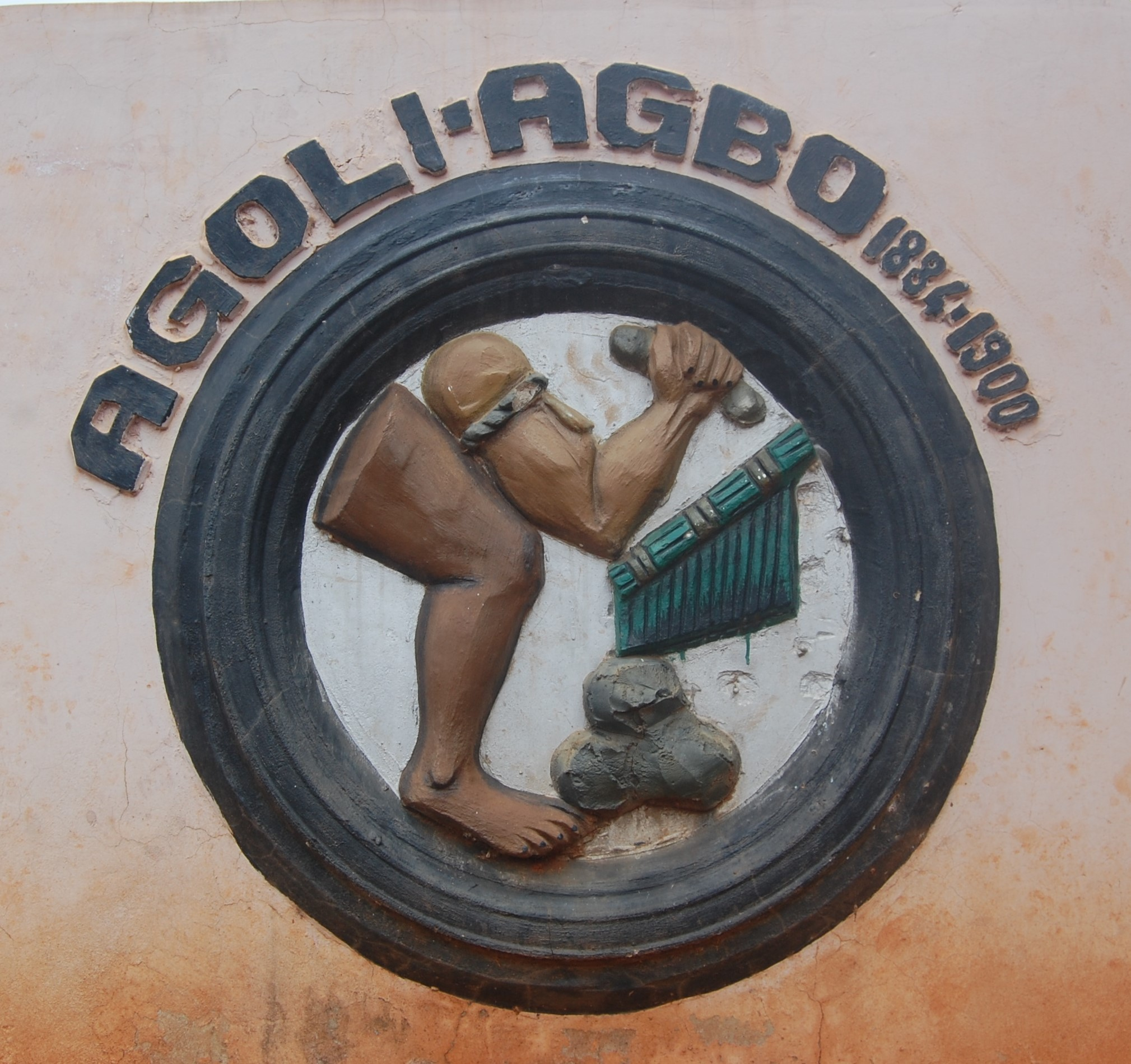
Symbol of Agoli Agbo at Place Goho Abomey in 2020

Agoli-agbo's symbols are a leg kicking a rock, a bow (a symbol of the return to traditional weapons under the new rules established by the colonial administrators), and a broom, and the last king of Dahomey.

Agoli-agbo Kingdom of Dahomey Born: ? Died: 1940
Regnal titles
Preceded by Béhanzin	King of Dahomey; 1894–1900	Succeeded by French conquest
Titles in pretence
Loss of title French conquest	— TITULAR — King of Dahomey; 1900–1940	Incumbent; Heir: Aidododo
