= Joseph Gaudérique Aymerich =

French soldier (1858–1937)

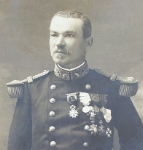
- Born: 20 February 1858; Estagel, France
- Died: 11 June 1937 (aged 79) Toulouse, France
- Allegiance: France
- Branch: Troupes de marine
- Service years: 1881–1921
- Rank: Divisional general
- Commands: 1st Senegalese Infantry Battalion; 8th Colonial Infantry Regiment; 1st Senegalese Tirailleurs Regiment; 7th Colonial Infantry Regiment; 24th Colonial Infantry Regiment; 6th Brigade; 2nd Colonial Infantry Division; Commandant-superior of French Equatorial Africa; French Cameroons Administrator
- Conflicts: Sino-French War; French Sudanese Campaign; Second Franco-Dahomean War; Ivory Coast Campaign; World War I
- Awards: Grand Officier of the Legion of Honour; Colonial Medal with clasp Sudan; Tonkin Expedition commemorative medal Dahomey Expedition commemorative medal Knight of the Order of the Dragon of Annam; Officer of the Royal Order of Cambodia

Joseph Gaudérique Aymerich (20 February 1858 – 11 June 1937) was a French military officer in its colonial empire.

== Biography ==
Aymerich was born in Estagel, in the Pyrénées-Orientales, the eldest of three sons of Férréol-Vincent Aymerich and Thérèse Marie Moner. He was commissioned at age 18, and attended the military college of Saint-Cyr. He commanded several units during World War I.

He was military commander and Administrator of French Cameroons after the German colony of Kamerun was seized in the Kamerun campaign of World War I. In 1933, he published La Conquête du Cameroun (The Conquest of Cameroon).
