= 1930 Dahomeyan Administrative Council election =

- 1930
- 3 elected seats on the Administrative Council

Administrative Council elections were held in Dahomey in 1930.

== Electoral system ==
Three members of the Administrative Council were elected from single-member constituencies; Abomey, Ouidah and Porto-Novo. However, the franchise was extremely restricted.

== Campaign ==
In Porto-Novo, Augustin Nicoué ran against the incumbent Casimir d'Almeida. D'Almeida was supported by the La Voix newspaper, whilst Nicoué was supported by Le Phare du Dahomey.

== Results ==
Despite Nicoué's campaign, Casimir d'Almeida was re-elected.

Constituency	Elected candidate
Abomey	
Ouidah	
Porto-Novo	Casimir d'Almeida
