= Visesegan =

African official

Visesegan was an African official, the favorite wife of Glele, King of Dahomey. Visesegan was tononu of the Dahomey, a rank comparable to being the head of the wives. The first records of her date to 1863, when Richard Burton recorded that she was one of Yavedo's assistants. She rose to be the most powerful woman by the 1870s, being in charge of other women living in the palace. Visesegan was additionally the wealthiest woman in the palace and controlled commercial licenses. She first supported Ahanhanzo and later her son Sasse Koku as the successor to her husband. When Béhanzin became king instead, Visesegan led an attempt to overthrow him, which ultimately was unsuccessful. She lost her property as a result. She had also advocated for "accommodating" the French, who were becoming increasingly involved in the region. Visesegan died in 1912.
