= Glele =

King of Dahomey (d. 1889)

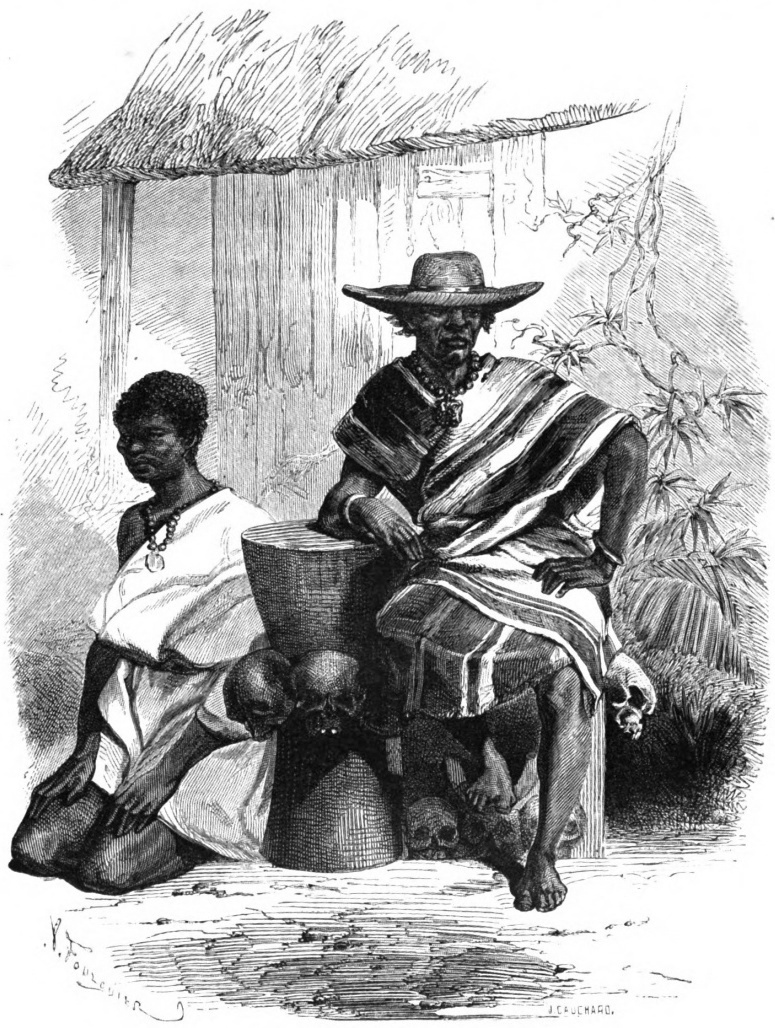
Crown Prince Glele (left) with his father, King Ghezo

Glele, or Badohou (died December 29, 1889), was the tenth King of Dahomey, ruling from 1858 until his suicide in 1889.

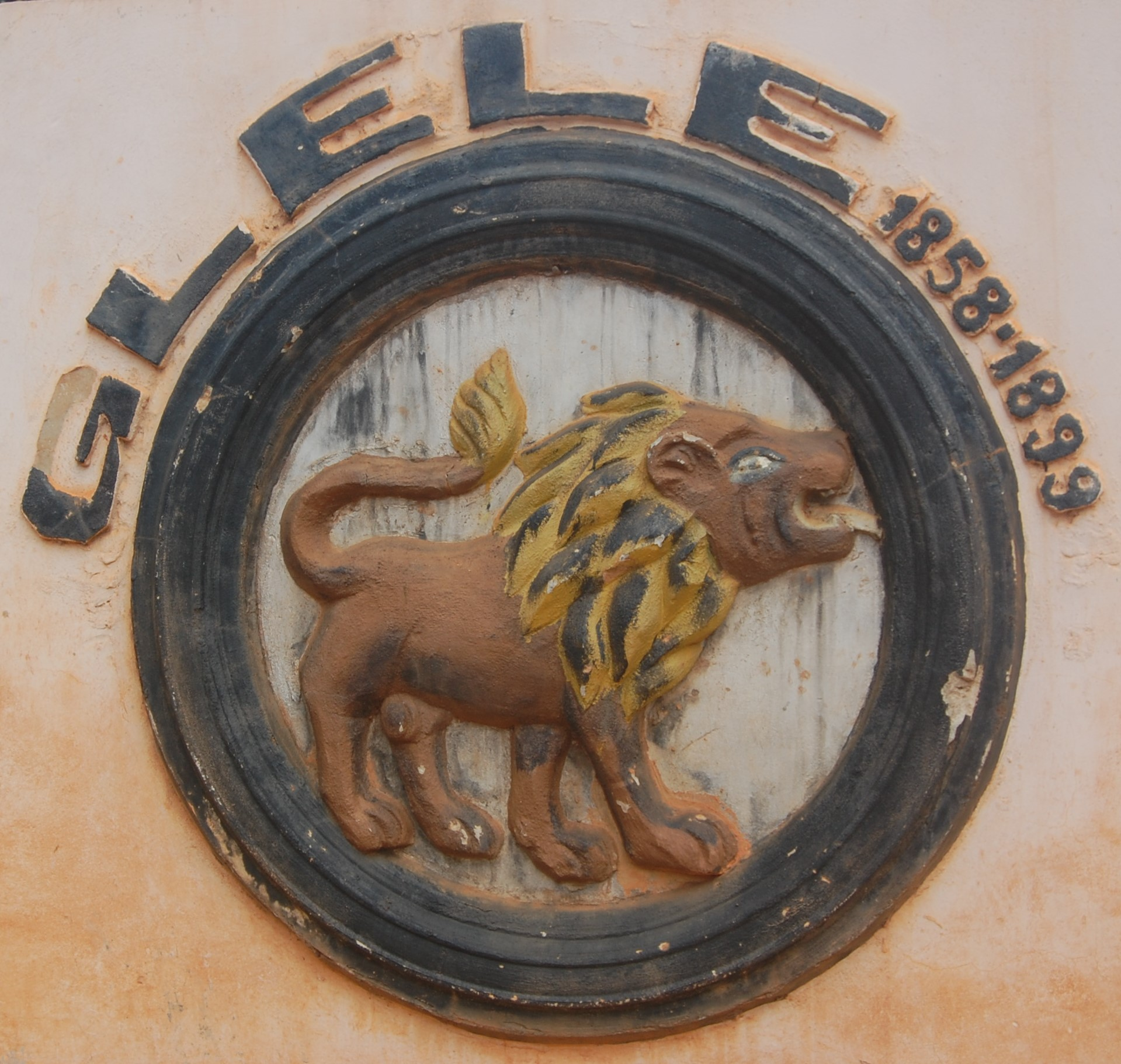
Symbol of Glele in place goho

== Life ==
Badohou, who took the throne name Glele, is considered (if Adandozan is not counted) to be the tenth King of the Aja kingdom of Dahomey (part of modern-day Benin). He succeeded his father, Ghezo, and ruled from 1858 to 1889.

Glele continued his father's successful war campaigns, in part to avenge his father's death, and to capture slaves. During his rule he sustained Dahomey's renaissance as a center of palm oil sales and slave trade. Glele also signed treaties with the French, who had previously acquired a concession in Porto-Novo from its king. The French were successful in negotiating with Glele and receiving a grant for a customs and commerce concession in Cotonou during his reign. Glele resisted British diplomatic overtures, however, distrusting their manners and noting that they were much more activist in their opposition to the slave trade: though revolutionary France itself had outlawed slavery at the end of the 18th century it allowed the trade to continue elsewhere; Britain outlawed slavery in the United Kingdom and its overseas possessions in 1833, and had its navy make raids against slavers along the West African coast starting in 1840.

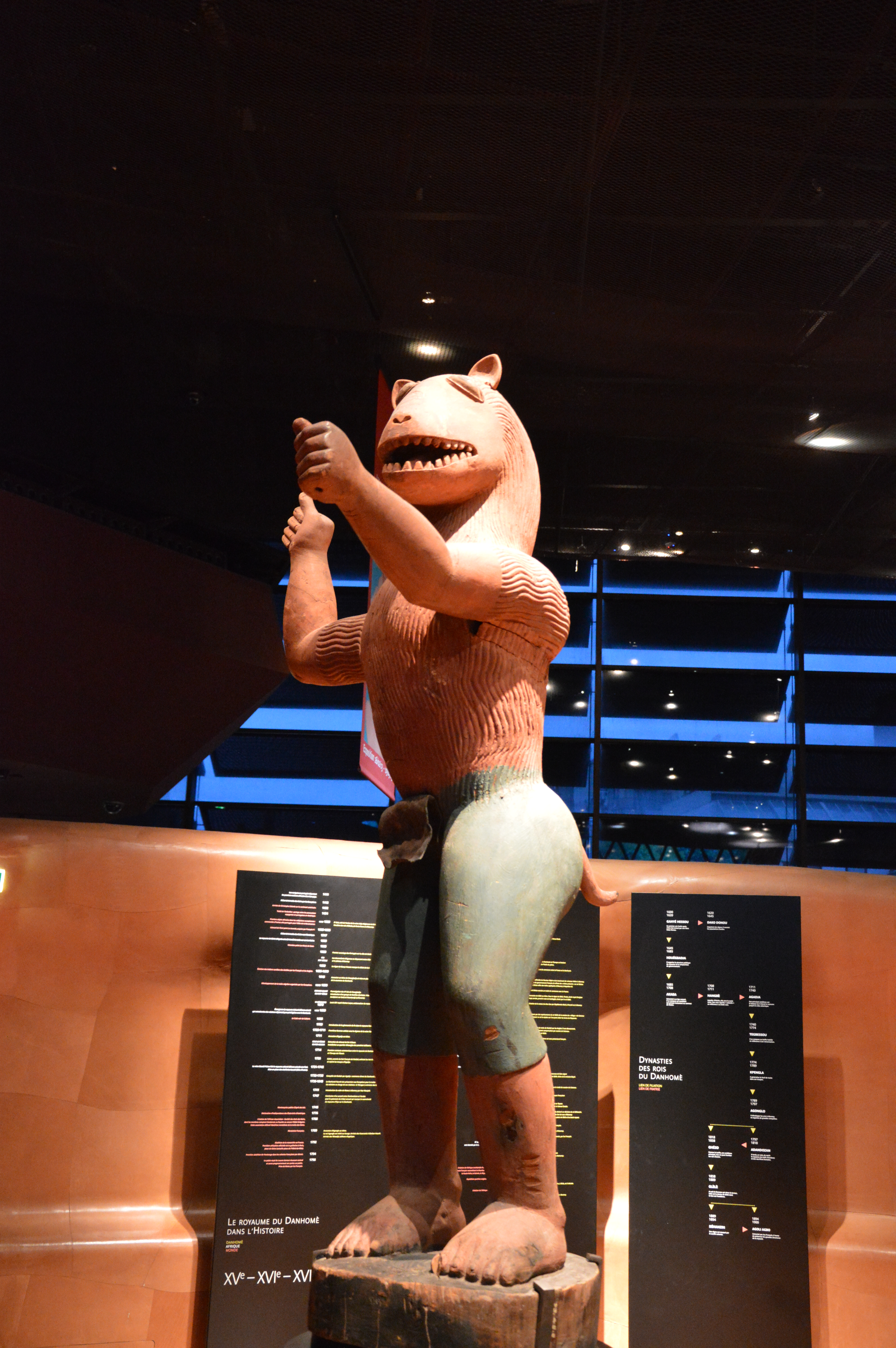
Statue depicting Glele as a lion. Formerly in the Musée du Quai Branly, now in Abomey.

Glele's symbols are the lion and the ritual knife of the adepts of Gu (Vodou of fire, iron, war, and cutting edges). His favorite wife was Visesegan. Another wife was the Yoruba-speaking high official Miagbe, with whom he had three sets of twin offspring, the eldest of whom was Yaya Migansi; Miagbe was rewarded by being honoured with an independent household, land and servants.

Glele, despite the formal end of the slave trade and its interdiction by the Europeans, and New World powers, continued slavery as a domestic institution: his fields were primarily cared for by slaves, and slaves became a major source of 'messengers to the ancestors' (sacrificial victims) in ceremonies. In 1860, he met with William Foster, captain of the Clotilda, the final ship to (illegally) take slaves to the United States, presumably to approve the sale.

Near the end of Glele's reign, relations with France deteriorated due to Cotonou's growing commercial influence and differences of interpretation between Dahomey and France over the extent and terms of the Cotonou concession grant. Glele died suddenly just before the French arrived for negotiations, possibly by suicide. Glele's son Prince Kondo handled negotiations with the French.

Glele died on December 29, 1889, to be succeeded by his son Kondo, who took the name Béhanzin.

Regnal titles
Preceded by Ghezo	King of Dahomey; 1858–1889	Succeeded by Béhanzin
