= Second Franco-Dahomean War =

1892–1894 conflict between France and Dahomey

- Part of the Scramble for Africa
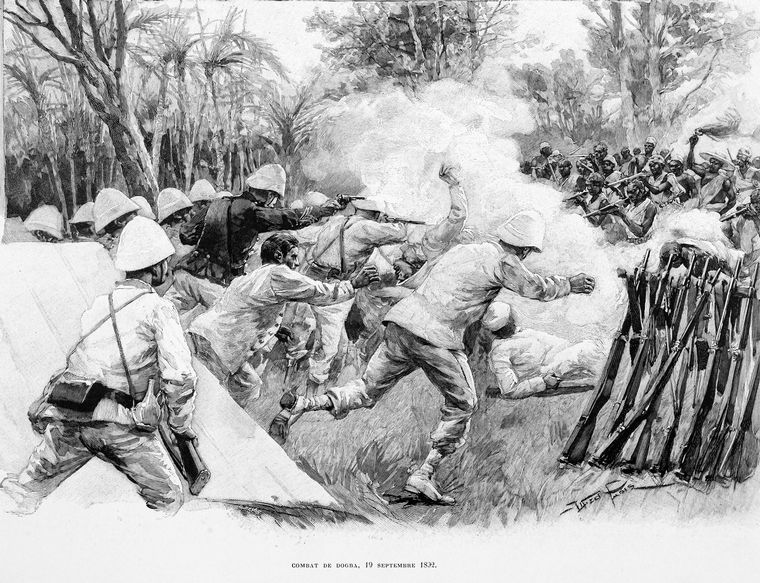
- Battle of Dogba, 19 September 1892
| Date | 4 July 1892 – 15 January 1894 |
| Location | Ouémé and Zou Departments of modern Benin |
| Result | French victory |

Belligerents
| Dahomey | France: Porto-Novo |

Commanders and leaders
| (Dahomey) Béhanzin | (French Third Republic) Alfred-Amédée Dodds |

Strength
| 8,800 regulars 1,200 Amazons | 2,164 French soldiers 2,600 Porto-Novo porters |

Casualties and losses
| 1,753 killed 2,680 wounded | 85 killed 440 wounded 205 died of disease |

The Second Franco-Dahomean War, which raged from 1892 to 1894, was a major conflict between France, led by General Alfred-Amédée Dodds, and Dahomey under King Béhanzin. The French emerged triumphant and incorporated Dahomey into their growing colonial territory of French West Africa.

== Background ==
In 1890, the Kingdom of Dahomey and France had gone to war in what is referred to as the First Franco-Dahomean War over the former's rights to certain territories, specifically those in the Ouémé Valley. The Fon ceased hostilities with the French after two military defeats, withdrawing their forces and signing a treaty conceding to all French demands. However, Dahomey remained a potent force in the area and quickly re-armed with modern weapons in anticipation of a second, decisive conflict.

== Casus belli ==
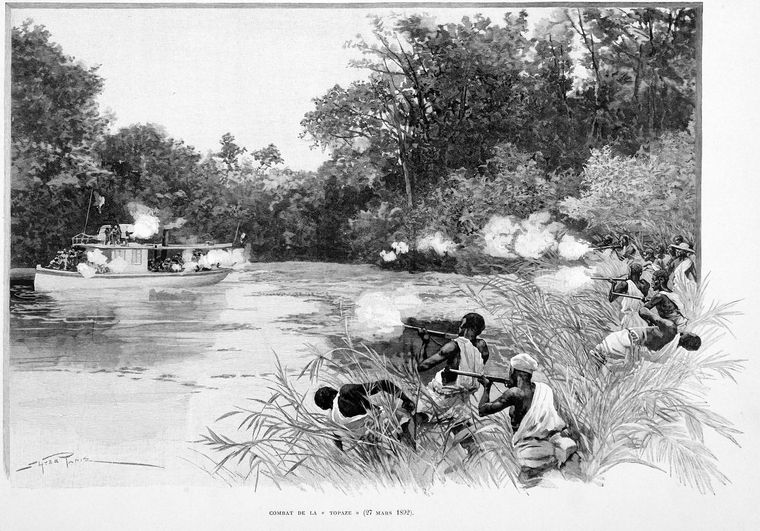
Dahomey warriors firing at the gunboat Topaze.

After re-arming and regrouping, the Fon returned to raiding the Ouémé Valley, the same valley fought over in the first war with France. Victor Ballot, the French Resident at Porto-Novo, was sent via gunboat upriver to investigate. His ship was attacked and forced to depart with five men wounded in the incident. King Béhanzin rejected complaints by the French, and war was declared immediately by the French.

== Military build up ==
The French entrusted the war effort against Dahomey to Alfred-Amédée Dodds, a colonel of the Troupes de marine from Senegal. Colonel Dodds arrived with a force of 2,164 men, including Foreign Legionnaires, marines, engineers, artillery and Senegalese cavalry known as spahis plus the trusted tirailleurs. These forces were armed with the new Lebel rifles, which would prove decisive in the coming battle. The French protectorate kingdom of Porto-Novo also added some 2,600 porters to aid in the fight.

The Fon, prior to the outbreak of the second war, had stockpiled between 4,000 and 6,000 rifles, including Mannlicher and Winchester carbines. These were purchased from German merchants via the port of Whydah. King Béhanzin also bought some machine guns and Krupp cannons, but it is unknown (and unlikely) that these were ever put to use.

== Beginning of hostilities ==
On 15 June 1892, the French blockaded Dahomey's coast to prevent any further arms sales. Then, on 4 July, the first shots of the war were fired from French gunboats with the shelling of several villages along the lower Ouémé Valley. The carefully organised French army began moving inland in mid-August toward their final destination of the Dahomey capital of Abomey.

=== Battle of Dogba ===
The French invasion force assembled at the village of Dogba on 14 September some 80 kilometres (50 mi) upriver on the border of Dahomey and Porto-Novo. At around 5:00 a.m. on 19 September, the French force was attacked by an army of Dahomey. The Fon broke off the attack after three to four hours of relentless fighting, characterised by repeated attempts by the Fon for melee combat. Hundreds of Fon were left dead on the field with the French forces suffering only five dead.

=== Battle of Poguessa ===
The French forces moved another 24 km (15 mi) upriver before turning west in the direction of Abomey. On 4 October, the French column was attacked at Poguessa (also known as Pokissa or Kpokissa) by Fon forces under the command of King Béhanzin himself. The Fon staged several fierce charges over two to three hours that all failed against the 20-inch (50 cm) bayonets of the French. The Dahomey army left the field in defeat losing some 200 soldiers. The French carried the day with only 42 casualties. The Dahomey Amazons were also conspicuous in the battle.

== Trek to Abomey ==
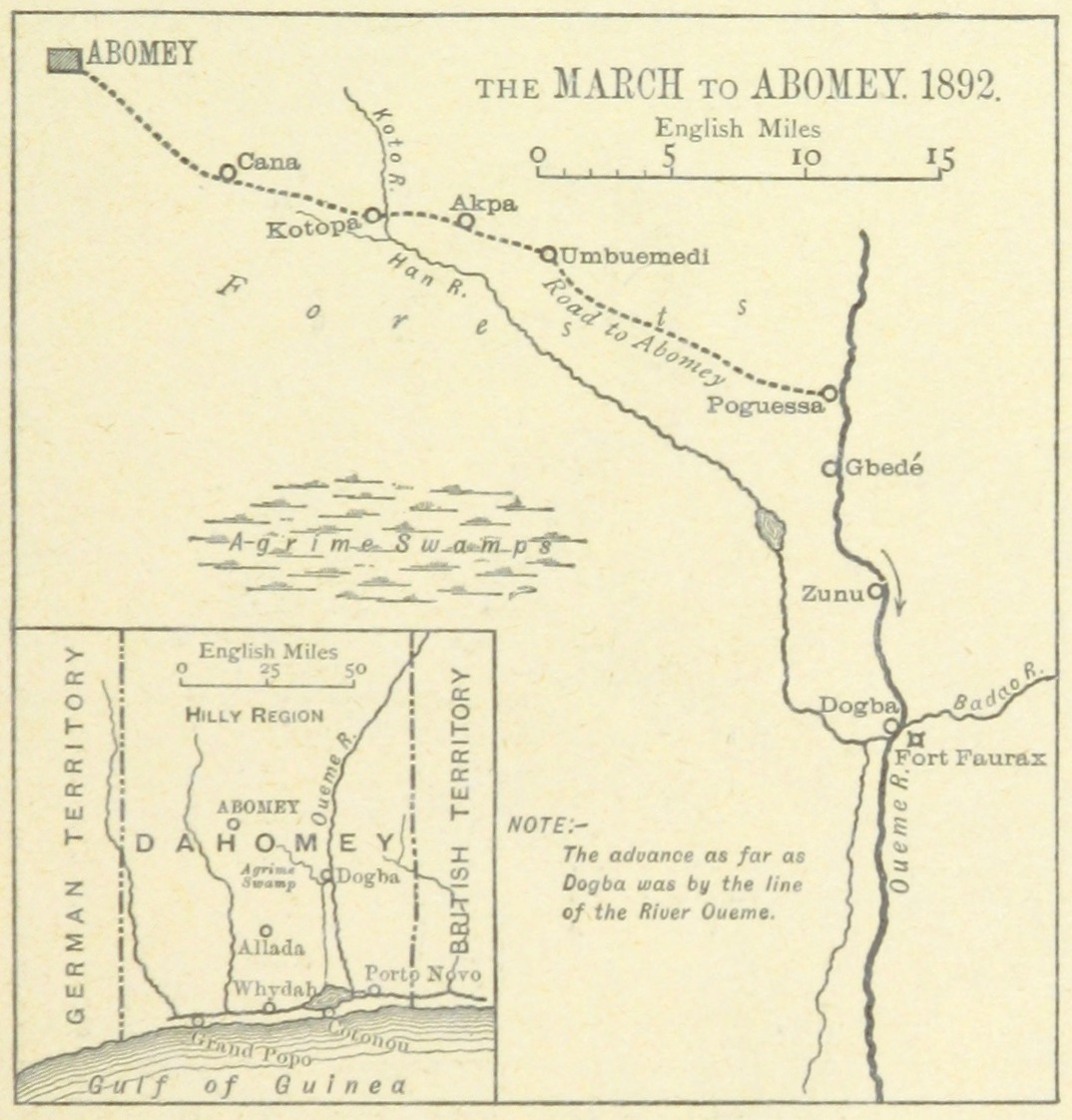
The French route to Abomey

After the defeat at Poguessa, the Fon resorted to guerrilla tactics rather than set-piece engagements. It took the French invasion force a month to march the 40 km (25 mi) between Poguessa and the last major battle at Cana just outside Abomey. The Fon fought from foxholes and trenches to slow the French invasion.

=== Battle of Adégon ===
On 6 October, the French had another major encounter with the Fon, at the village of Adégon. The Fon fared badly again, losing 86 Dahomey regulars and 417 Dahomey Amazons. The French suffered six dead and 32 wounded. The French bayonet charge inflicted most of the Dahomey casualties. The battle was a turning point for Dahomey: the royal court lost hope. The battle was also significant in that much of Dahomey's Amazon corps was lost.

=== Siege at Akpa ===
The French column was able to cross another 24 km (15 mi) toward Abomey after Adégon, bivouacking at the village of Akpa. From the moment they arrived, they were attacked daily. From the French arrival until 14 October, Dahomey's Amazons were absent. On 15 October, some women were noted to have been present on the front lines of the Dahomean forces which were defeated after a bayonet charge by a Legion battalion. An Amazon was reported to have shot the battalion commander from close range in the chest at some point before fire from the Legion section "demolished the whole rank" of the Dahomean infantry which the Amazon had led. Once resupplied, the French departed Akpa on 26 October, heading toward the village of Cotopa.

== End of Dahomey ==
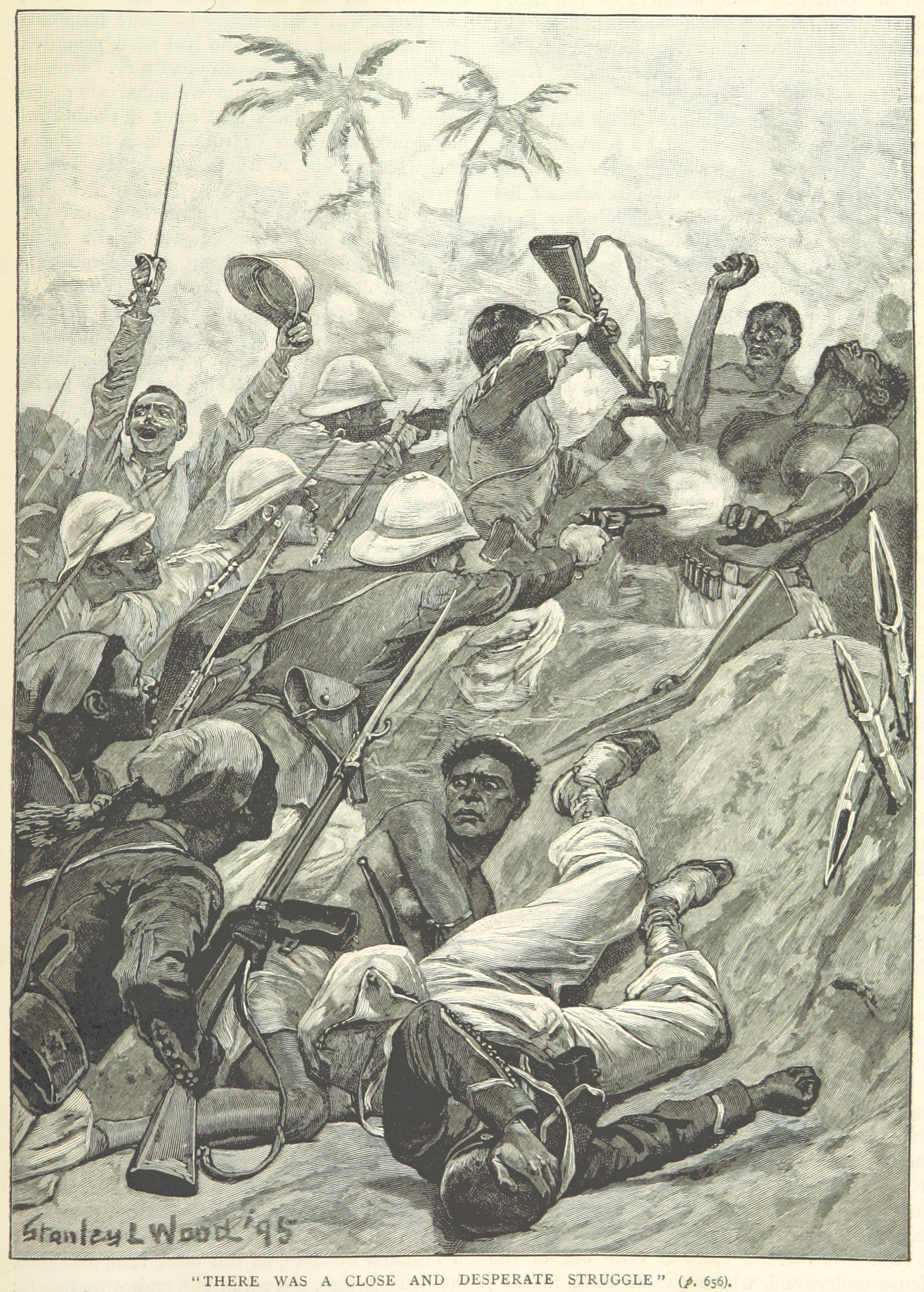
Hand-to-hand fighting at Cotopa (from a British book)

From 26 to 27 October, the French fought through the Dahomey forces at Cotopa and elsewhere, crossing lines of enemy trenches. Bayonet charges were the deciding factor in nearly all engagements. The Fon penchant for hand-to-hand fighting left them at a disadvantage against French bayonets, which easily outreached Dahomey's swords and machetes. The Amazons are reported by the French to have fought the hardest, charging out of their trenches but to no avail.

=== Battle of Cana ===
From 2 to 4 November, the French and Fon armies fought on the outskirts of Cana. By this time, Béhanzin's army numbered no more than 1,500, including slaves and pardoned convicts. On 3 November, the king directed an attack on the French bivouac, with the Mino (Amazons) playing a prominent role. After four hours of combat, the Fon army withdrew. The next day, at the nearby village of Diokoué, site of a royal palace, special units of the Mino were assigned to target French officers. Nevertheless, after a full day of fighting the French overran the Dahomey army with a bayonet charge.

== End of the war ==
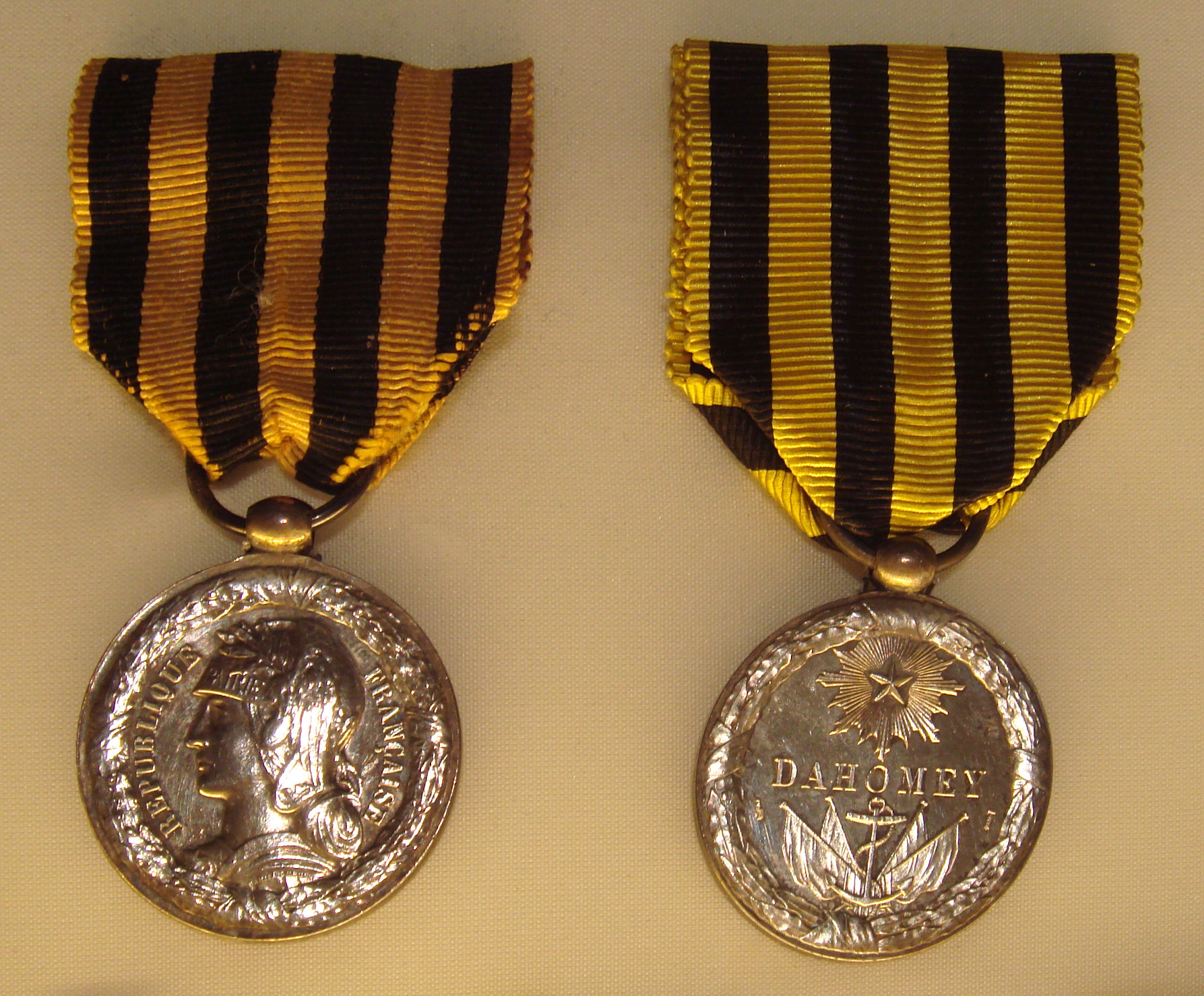
French Medal of the Dahomey campaign. Law of 12 November 1892. Musée de la Légion d'honneur.

On 5 November, Dahomey sent a truce mission to the French, and the next day saw the French enter Cana. The peace mission failed, however, and on 16 November, the French army marched on Abomey. King Béhanzin, refusing to let the capital fall into enemy hands, burned and evacuated the city. He and the remnants of the Dahomey army fled north as the French entered the capital on 17 November. The French tricolour was hoisted over the Singboji palace, which survived the fire and remains in modern Benin to this day.

The king of Dahomey fled to Atcheribé, 48 km (30 mi) north of the capital. Attempts were initiated to rebuild the army and its Amazon corps until the French chose Béhanzin's brother, Goutchili, as the new king. King Béhanzin surrendered to the French on 15 January 1894 and was exiled to Martinique. The war had officially ended.

== Bibliography ==
- Roques, Pierre Auguste (1895). Le Génie au Dahomey en 1892 … Avec une carte. Extrait de la Revue du Génie militaire (in French). Berger-Levrault & Co – via British Library.
- Alpern, Stanley B. (1998). Amazons of Black Sparta: The Women Warriors of Dahomey. New York: New York University Press. ISBN 978-0-8147-0677-0.
