= Béhanzin =

King of Dahomey from c. 1890 to c. 1894

Gbehanzin
- King of Dahomey
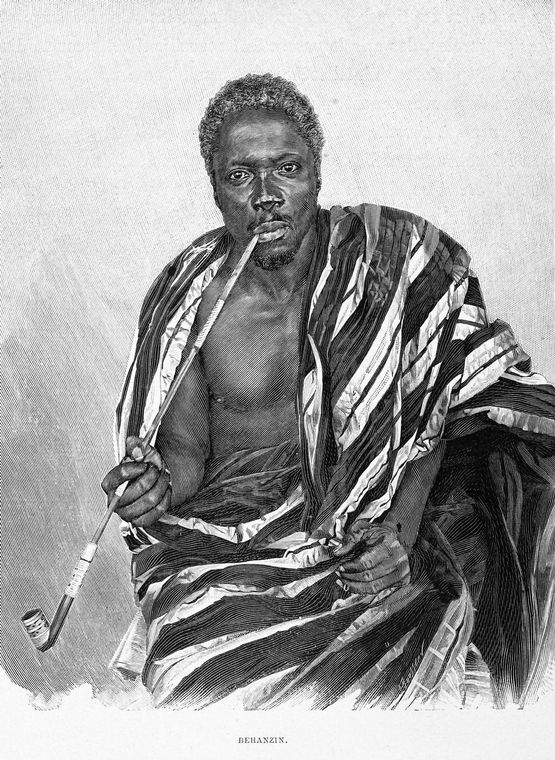
- King Béhanzin, c. 1895
- Reign: c. January 1890 – c. 1894
- Predecessor: Glele
- Successor: Agoli-agbo
- Born: c. 1845
- Died: December 10, 1906 (aged 60–61); Algiers, French Algeria
- Father: Glele

Gbehanzin, also known as Béhanzin (c. 1845 – 10 December 1906), is considered the eleventh (if Adandozan is not counted) King of Dahomey, modern-day Republic of Benin. Upon taking the throne, he changed his name from Kondo.

Following his father Glele's suicide, Béhanzin ascended the throne in January 1890 and ruled until 1894, when he was defeated by the French in the Second Franco-Dahomean War and exiled to Martinique. Béhanzin was Dahomey's last independent ruler established through traditional power structures. He led the resistance to French colonization of his kingdom, during the Dahomey Wars.

== Biography ==
Béhanzin was seen by his people as intelligent and courageous. He saw that the Europeans were gradually encroaching on this section of the West African Coast, and as a result attempted a foreign policy of isolating the Europeans and rebuffing them. As prince just before the death of his father Glele, Béhanzin declined to meet French envoy Jean Bayol, claiming conflicts in his schedule due to ritual and ceremonial obligations.

=== First Franco-Dahomean War ===
In March 1889, Dahomey attacked a village on the Ouémé whose chief was under the protection of the French. After remarking that the flag of the tricolour would protect him, the Fon commanded one of his Dahomey Amazons to behead him and wrap his head in the flag. France responded by fortifying the city of Cotonou, which had been ceded to them by a Dahomey representative in Ouidah, increasing its forces with French Senegalese and Gabonese soldiers, and arresting local Dahomey officials who had been continuing to collect customs in the port. Skirmishes also broke out with local militias. On March 4, 1890, a Dahomey army of several thousand charged the log stockade around Cotonou at approximately 5 in the morning. The French army stood fast due to superior weaponry, strategy and the advantageous position they had prepared. Eventually Béhanzin's forces were forced to withdraw. While there were few losses on the French side, the Dahomey suffered the loss of several hundred soldiers (129 within French lines).

After regrouping, Dahomey sent its forces south to attack the French-protected city of Porto-Novo ruled by King Toffa I. A force of 350 French soldiers assisted by 500 of King Toffa's soldiers intercepted Béhanzin's force of 9000 warriors in the Battle of Atchoukpa. While the local Porto-Novo soldiers were routed during the initial Dahomey charge, the French forces formed infantry squares to protect themselves and successfully repelled the Dahomey, suffering only 8 casualties to the Dahomey's 1500.

On 3 October 1890, Dahomey signed a treaty recognizing the kingdom of Porto-Novo as a French protectorate. Béhanzin was also forced to definitely cede Cotonou.

=== Second Franco-Dahomean War ===
The peace lasted two years, but both sides continued to buy arms in preparation for another battle. In 1892, the soldiers of Abomey attacked villages near Grand Popo and Porto-Novo in an effort to reassert the older boundaries of Dahomey. King Béhanzin rejected complaints by the French, who proceeded to declare war.

The French further justified the annexation of Dahomey by characterizing the Dahomeans as savages in need of civilizing, and pointing to the human sacrifice of slaves made to the royal ancestors at the annual ceremonies known as annual customs and at a king's death, as evidence of this savagery. Dahomey was already at odds with other colonial empires for their practice of attacking and enslaving neighboring kingdoms, both for domestic slaves (including human sacrifice), and trans-atlantic trade, which came at odds with the British Empire's anti-slavery campaign during the 19th century.

The French also pointed to the existence of the women's militia that protected the king, whom the Fon referred to simply as Minon (or "mothers"), but the French called Amazons after the fierce women warriors of Greek mythology. These women soldiers were thought to have become common in the Fon army due to the extreme losses suffered by Dahomey during wars with neighboring kingdoms. Some official French propaganda from the period may be seen in prints depicting these so-called Amazons. One source claims that in one of the battles an Amazon killed a French officer by ripping out his throat with her sharpened teeth. Parallel accounts of the event handed down in Benin describe the Amazon as a trusted wife of Béhanzin who had sworn to avenge members of the royal family who had been executed by Béhanzin for treachery after divulging battle plans in return for bribes from French agents. The French officer she is said to have killed was allegedly the head of French military intelligence who committed the 'savage' act of corrupting family members to betray their own. The Amazon was reduced to using her teeth after her ammunition ran out at the battle's peak.

Through superior intelligence gathering, superior strategy, superior weaponry, bribery, and a campaign of psychological warfare that included cutting down most of the sacred trees in the Oueme and Zou, the French defeated Dahomey, one of the last African kingdoms to succumb to European colonization, with very few French losses. Instead of attacking Abomey directly by marching straight north from Calavi just north of Cotonou, French General Alfred Dodds attacked from Porto-Novo, moving up the Oueme valley until he was within striking distance of Abomey, via Cove and Bohicon, while the Fon continued to pattern their attacks in predictable melee combat style just before dawn, with shorter machete weapons and swords that had difficulty breaking disciplined French Bayonet lines.

Over a series of battles and guerilla warfare by the Fon attempting to slow the French march towards the Dahomey capital of Abomey, the French were victorious, sustaining only 85 casualties to the estimated 2000 to 4000 killed among the Fon. On November 5, 1892, following the loss of the royal palace, Béhanzin sent a truce mission to the French forces, but it failed. King Béhanzin, refusing to let the capital fall into enemy hands, burned and evacuated the city. He and the remnants of the Dahomey army fled north as the French entered the capital on 17 November, and installed Béhanzin's brother Agoli-agbo as the new King. After failing to rebuild his army, King Béhanzin eventually surrendered to the French on 15 January 1894. He lived out the remainder of his life in exile in Martinique and Algeria.

After his death, his remains were returned to Abomey. His throne and his sculptures of wood, copper, iron and silver are now in the Musee Quai Branly, and have been the topic of important discussions about their return to the Republic of Benin.

Béhanzin was succeeded by Agoli-agbo, his brother and one-time Army Chief of Staff, the only potential ruler with whom the French were willing to negotiate.

== Artistic representation ==
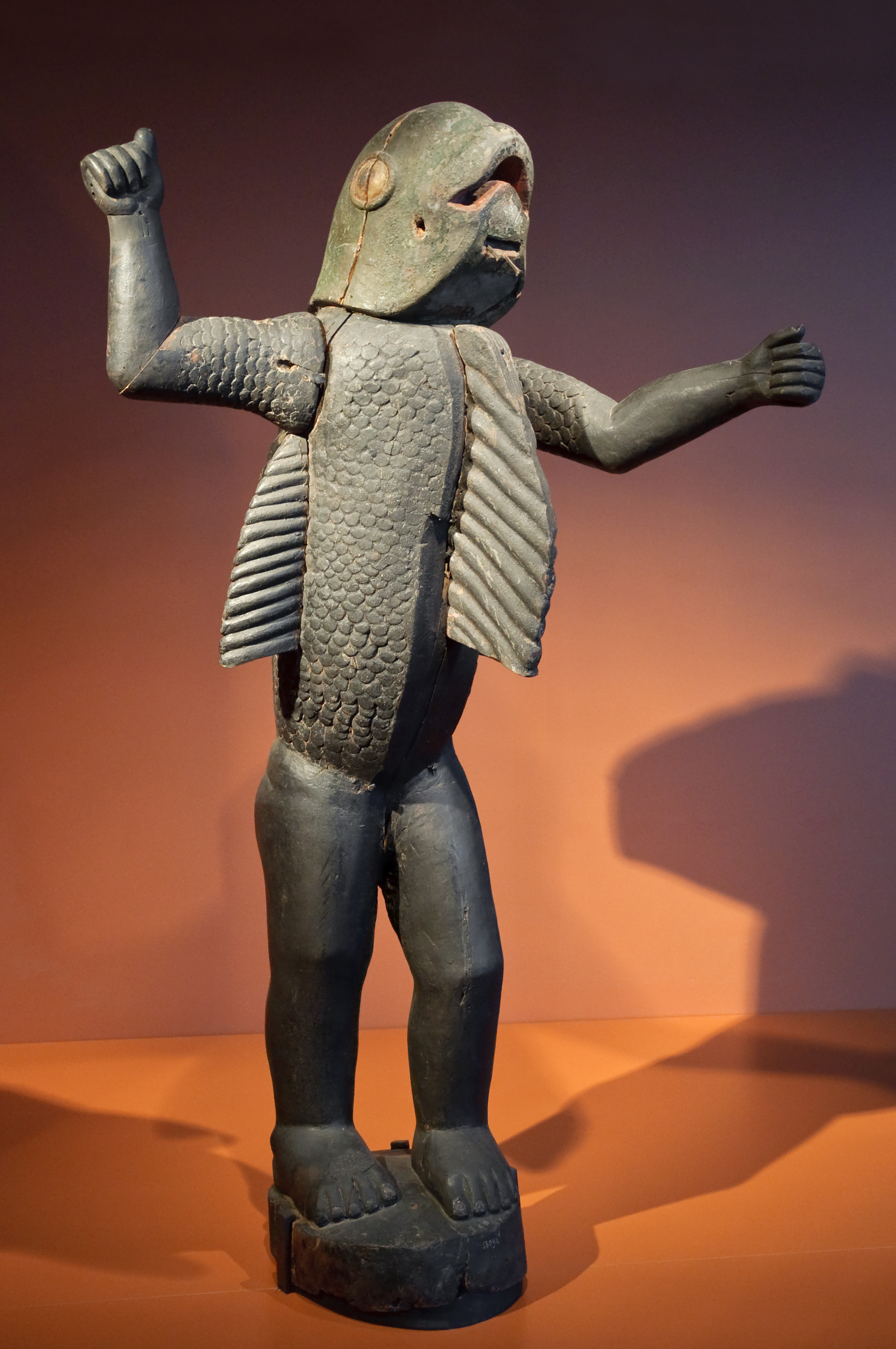
Man-Shark by Sossa Dede (c. 1890), a Fon statue symbolizing Béhanzin. Formerly in musée du quai Branly, now in Abomey.

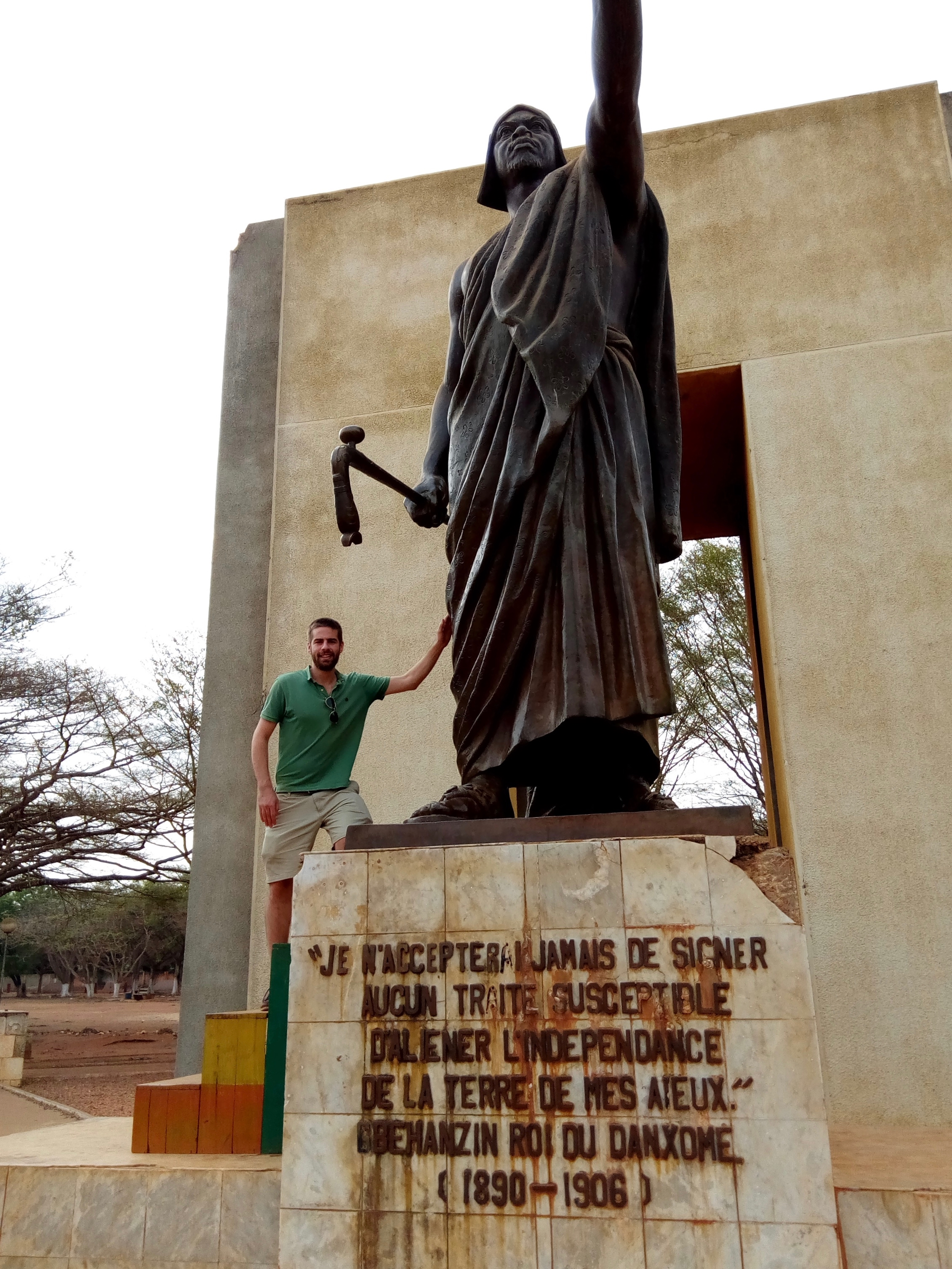
Place Goho Abomey

Each of Dahomey's kings was represented in sculpture with images that referred to the proverbs, associations, and wordplay attached to his royal name. The images that symbolize Behanzin (or Gbehanzin) include an egg held by a hand, as the words for these in the Fon language form a rebus, or pun, of the royal name. As may be seen in the large wooden statue from the royal palace at Abomey, the shark is a metaphor for Behanzin; as does the shark, the king guards the coast of the kingdom of Dahomey.

A captive hanging from a flagpole is a reference to a man from the Nago, or Yoruba, city of Kétou, a powerful rival state. This prisoner had boasted that he could attack the king with magic, but Behanzin hanged him from a flagpole as punishment for his rebellion. The king's most famous symbol is the smoking pipe. This is because he claimed that there wasn't a minute in his life, even when he was a baby, that he was not smoking tobacco.

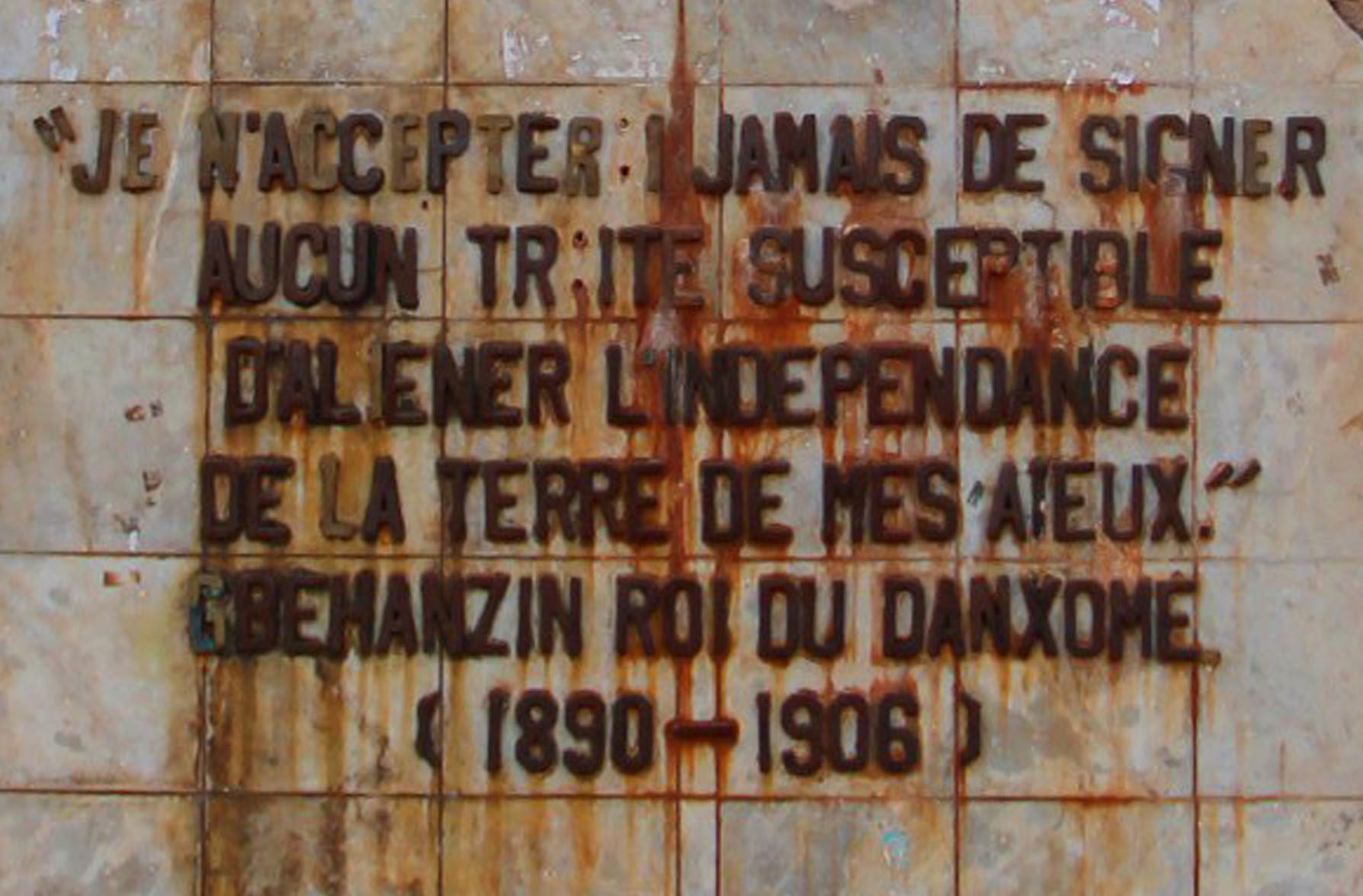
Gbehanzin statue in Abomey, sign

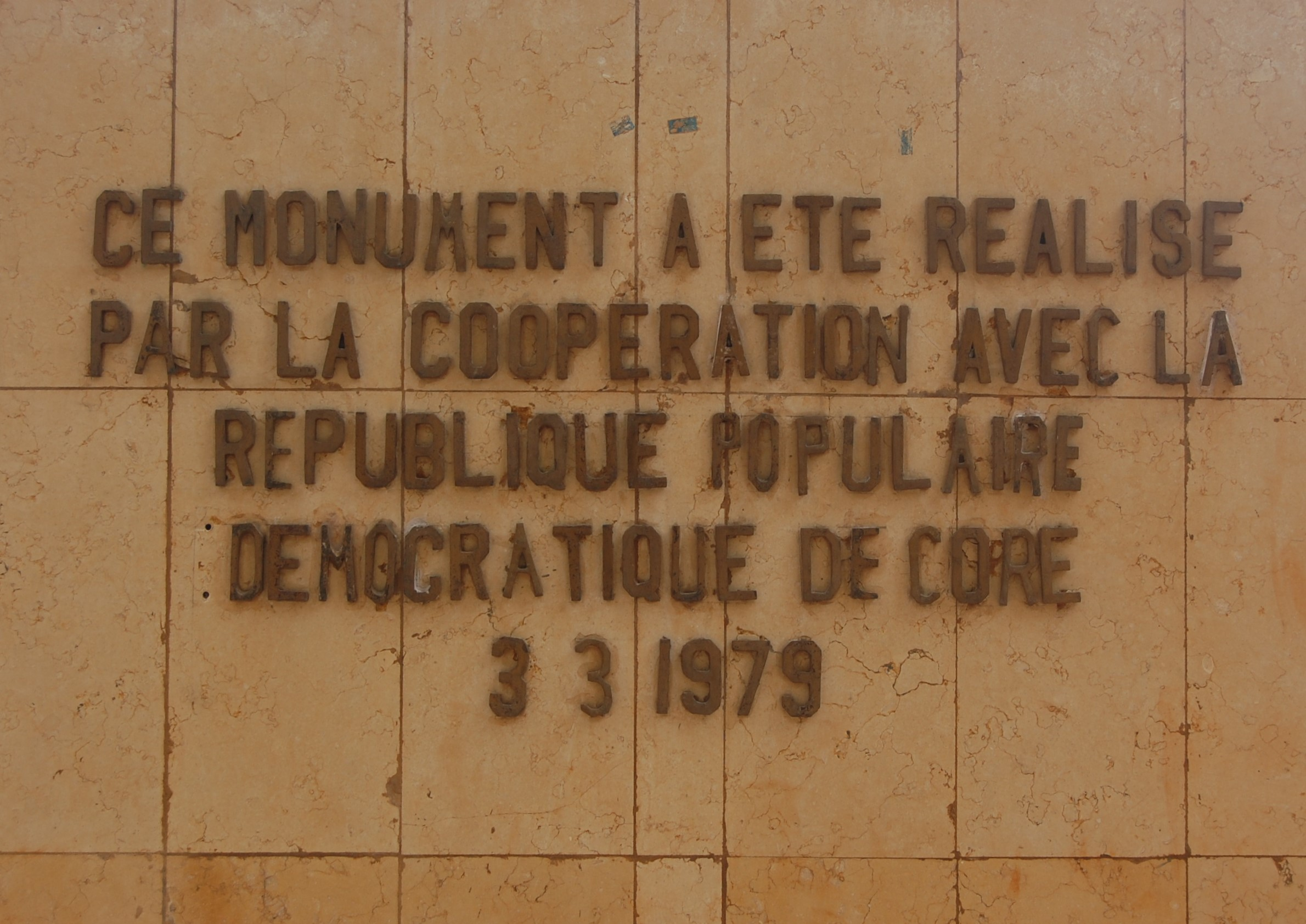
Inscription sous la statue du roi Béhanzin à la place Goho au Bénin

== Symbols ==
Royal banner

Coat of arms

== See also ==
- Scramble for Africa

Regnal titles
Preceded by Glele	King of Dahomey; 1889–1894	Succeeded by Agoli-agbo
