= Alfred-Amédée Dodds =

French general (1842–1922)

Alfred Dodds
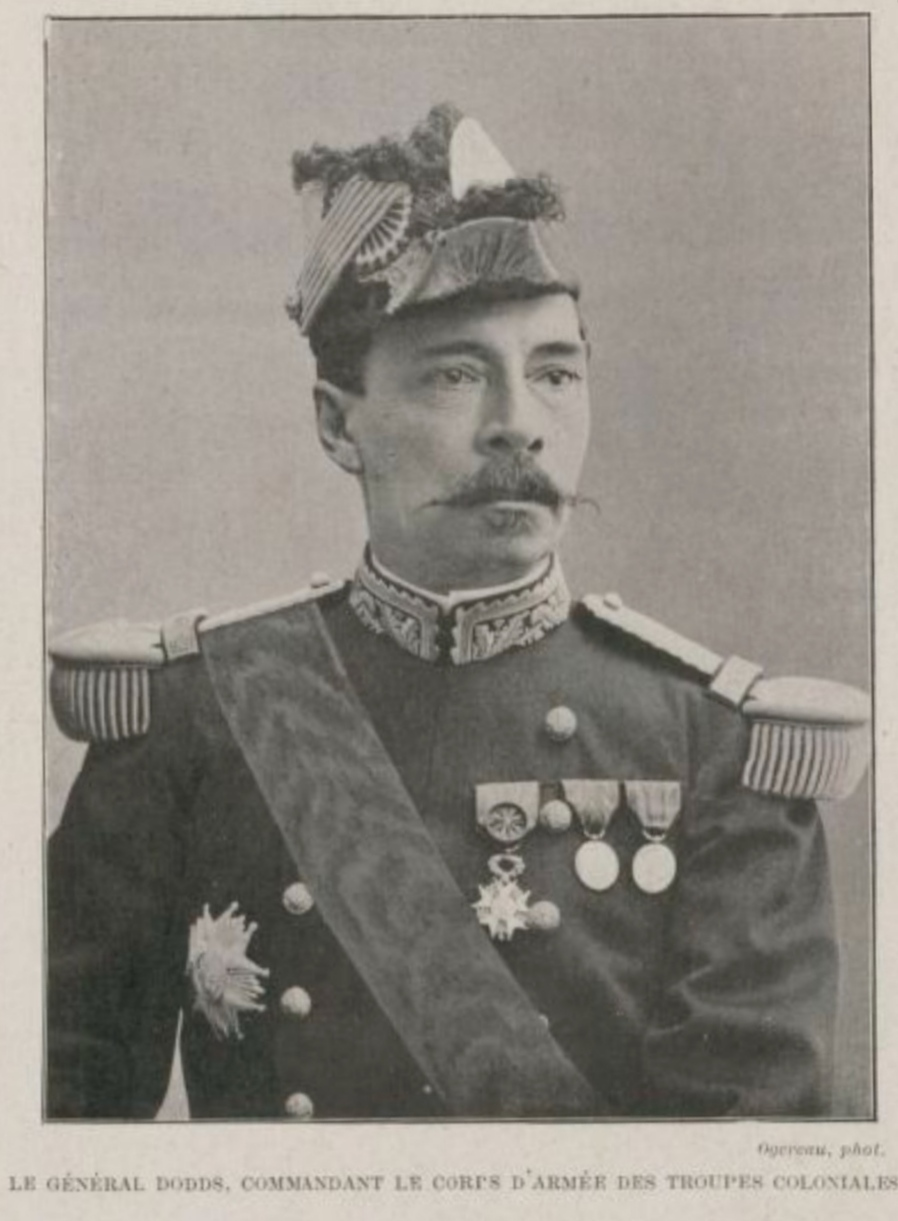
- Born: Alfred Amédée Dodds; 6 February 1842; Saint-Louis, Senegal
- Died: 17 July 1922 (aged 80); Paris, France
- Burial place: Père Lachaise Cemetery
- Military career
- Branch: Troupes de marine; Armée de la Loire; Armée de l'Est
- Service years: 1862–1907
- Rank: Général de division
- Wars: Franco-Prussian War; Sino-French War; 2nd Franco-Dahomean War

Alfred Amédée Dodds (6 February 1842 – 17 July 1922) was the commander of French forces in Senegal from 1890, commander of French forces in the second expeditionary force to suppress the Boxer Rebellion, and commander of French forces during the First and Second Franco-Dahomean War.

As both a quadroon and Métis, he was famed in the African diaspora at the beginning of the 20th century as an example of African leadership.

From 1892 to 1894, he led the conquest of Dahomey, one of West Africa's most powerful pre-colonial states, against King Béhanzin. Close to the French Radical Party, Alfred Dodds owed his nomination as expedition leader to the personal intervention of powerful French politician Georges Clemenceau.

== Biography ==
=== Early life ===
Dodds was born on 6 February 1842 in Saint-Louis, Senegal. His father was Antoine Henri Dodds, a merchant, and director of the Saint-Louis post office, a quadroon and of Métis descent; his mother was Charlotte de la Chapelle, a signare of French and African descent. He was the eldest of 10 children.

His paternal grandfather was John Dodds, a British Army officer and aide-de-camp to the last English governor of Saint-Louis. John Dodds was married to a Senegalese woman of French and African descent.

=== Military career ===
Dodds graduated from the École spéciale militaire de Saint-Cyr in 1862. He was promoted to lieutenant in the Troupes de marine in 1867 and subsequently posted to the French colony of Réunion where he distinguished himself during the riots of 1868.

He made captain in December 1869. During the Franco-Prussian War of 1870, his military prowess was noted at the Blue Division when he was made Knight of the Legion of Honour. Captured, he escaped after the capitulation of the Battle of Sedan, and rejoined the Armée de la Loire and later the Armée de l'Est. He was held in Switzerland at the end of the war.

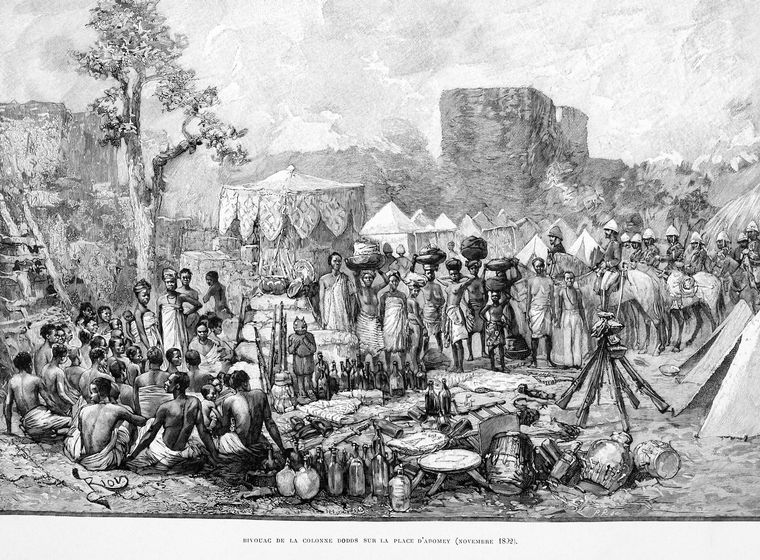
Dodds in Dahomey in 1892

He served in Senegal from 1871 to 1878, in Cochinchina from 1878 to 1879. Made battalion leader in 1879, he then served again in Senegal and participated in the fighting in Casamance from 1879 to 1883. Then made a lieutenant colonel, he served in the war of conquest in Tonkin.

A colonel in 1887, he served in the counter-insurgency warfare in the Fouta Djalon in French Guinea. He was decorated Commander of the Legion of Honour in 1891 and was given command of the Eighth Colonial Army in Toulon. Then, in 1892, he was appointed superior commander of Dahomey and led the Second Franco-Dahomean War.

Dodds was named général de brigade, inspector of naval infantry, and Grand Officer of the Legion of Honour in 1892, then General of Division in 1898. In 1900, he was given the High Command of colonial troops in French Indochina.

From 1903 to 1907 he was high commander of naval infantry and a member of the High Council of War. He was given the Grand Cross of the Legion of Honour and Military Medallion in 1907.
