= Toffa I =

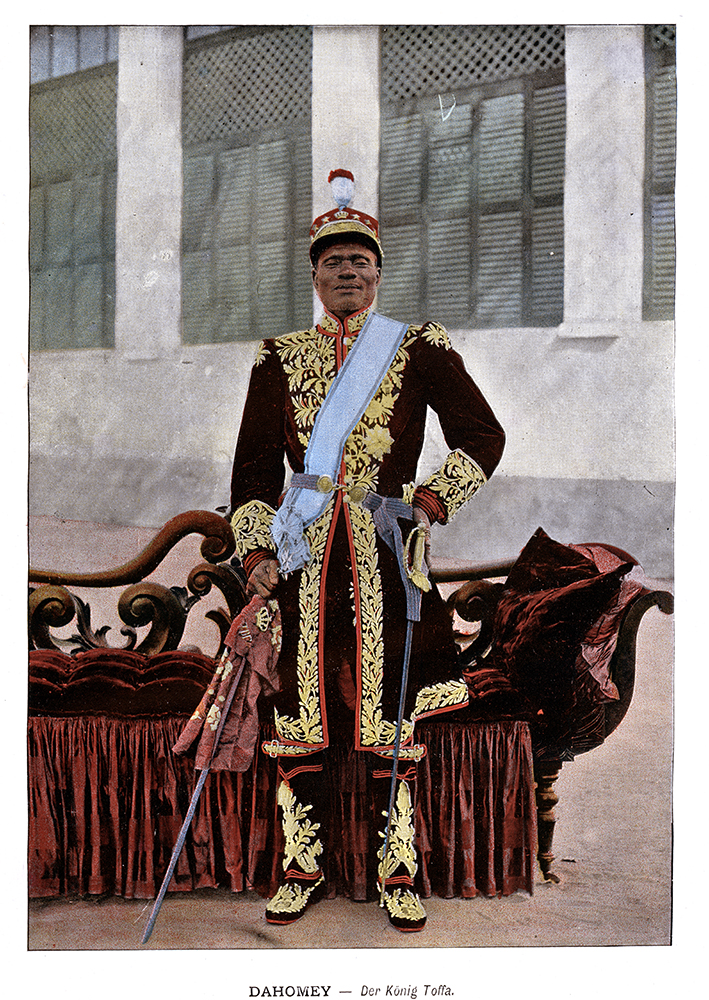
King Toffa c. 1890

King Toffa I (c.1850-1908) was a ruler of the kingdom of Họgbonu, or Ajase, an area of Benin which today is known as Porto-Novo, from 1874 until his death in 1908.

Upon becoming ruler in 1874, he was renowned for his openness and cooperation with the colonial powers. He encouraged his employees to attend French schools to receive western education and was also tolerant of Islam and Christianity entering the country and coexisting with traditional endogenous religions such as Animism or Orisha. However, the alliance between Toffa I and the kings of Abomey was never successful.

Toffa was noted for centralizing the power of Hogbonu's monarch and eliminating political rivals. Toffa was successful in abolishing the traditional electoral system of Porto-Novo's monarchy (called the "Z-system" by scholars), which dictated that the ruler was chosen in turn from five princely branches. The Z-system was replaced by a more hierarchical system based on descent from Toffa and supported by a complex structure of dignitaries, chiefly families, merchants, and eventually Christian missionaries. While the process of centralization began before the arrival of the French, they supported Toffa's efforts, and placed chiefs under his protection.

He established the Order of the Black Star in 1889. The palace in which he lived, located in Porto-Novo, is now a museum. A statue of Toffa is located in central Porto-Novo.

After Toffa's death, the throne was supposed to pass to his son and heir, Tolla-Toffa, but the French hindered succession and demoted him to "Superior Chief".
