= Abomey =

Abomey Agbomɛ (Fon)
- Commune and city
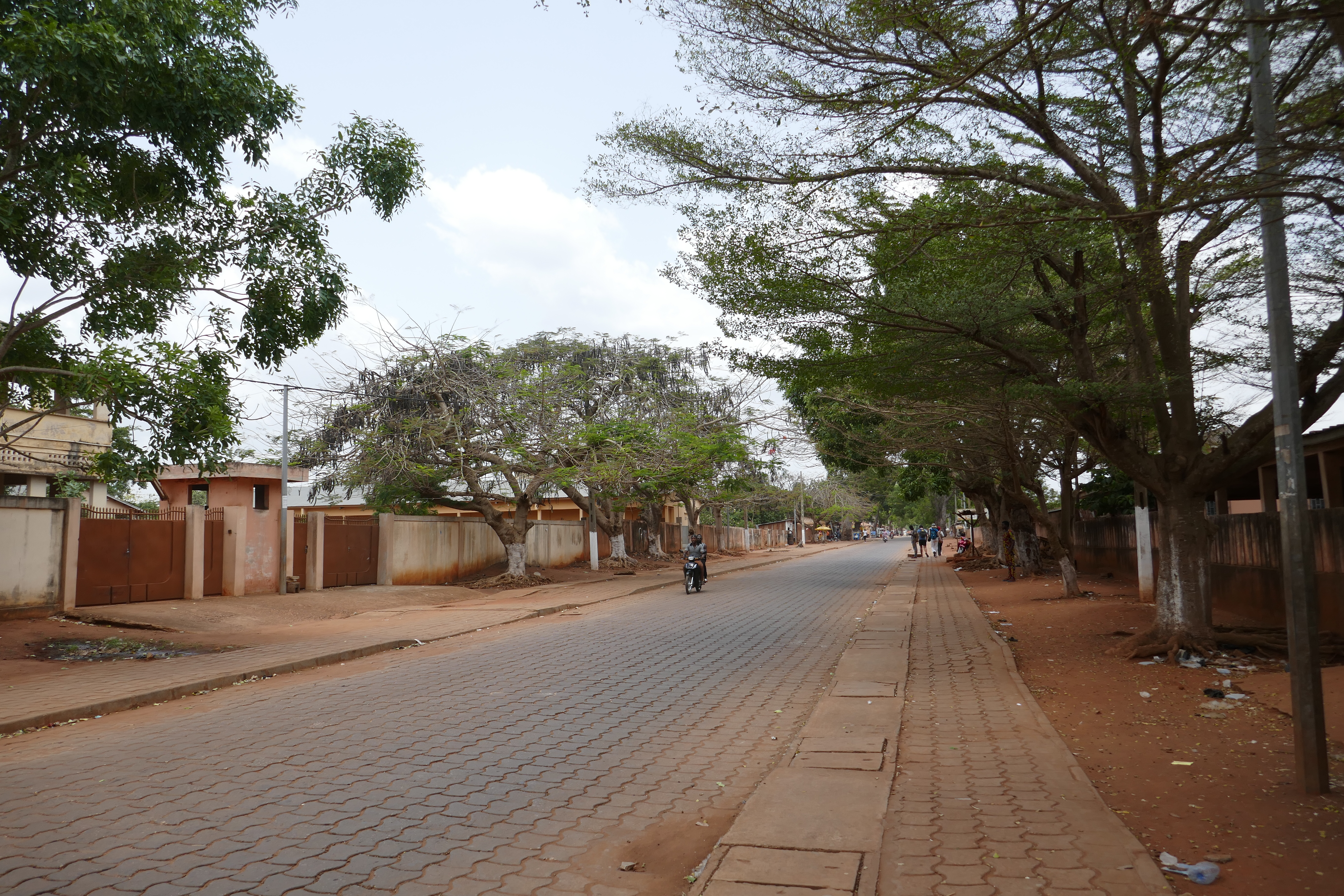
- A street in Abomey in 2017

- Location in Benin
- Coordinates: 7°11′8″N 1°59′17″E
- Country: Benin
- Department: Zou Department
- Founded: 1600s

Area
  - Total: 142 km^{2} (55 sq mi)
- Elevation: 221 m (725 ft)

Population (2012)
  - Total: 90,195
  - Density: 635/km^{2} (1,650/sq mi)
- Time zone: UTC+1 (WAT)

Abomey, or Agbome, [a.bɔ.mɛ] is the capital of the Zou Department of Benin. The commune of Abomey covers an area of 142 square kilometres and, as of 2025, it has a population of 96,974 people.

Abomey houses the Royal Palaces of Abomey, a collection of small traditional houses that were inhabited by the Kings of Dahomey from 1600 to 1900, and which were designated a World Heritage Site by UNESCO in 1985.

== History ==
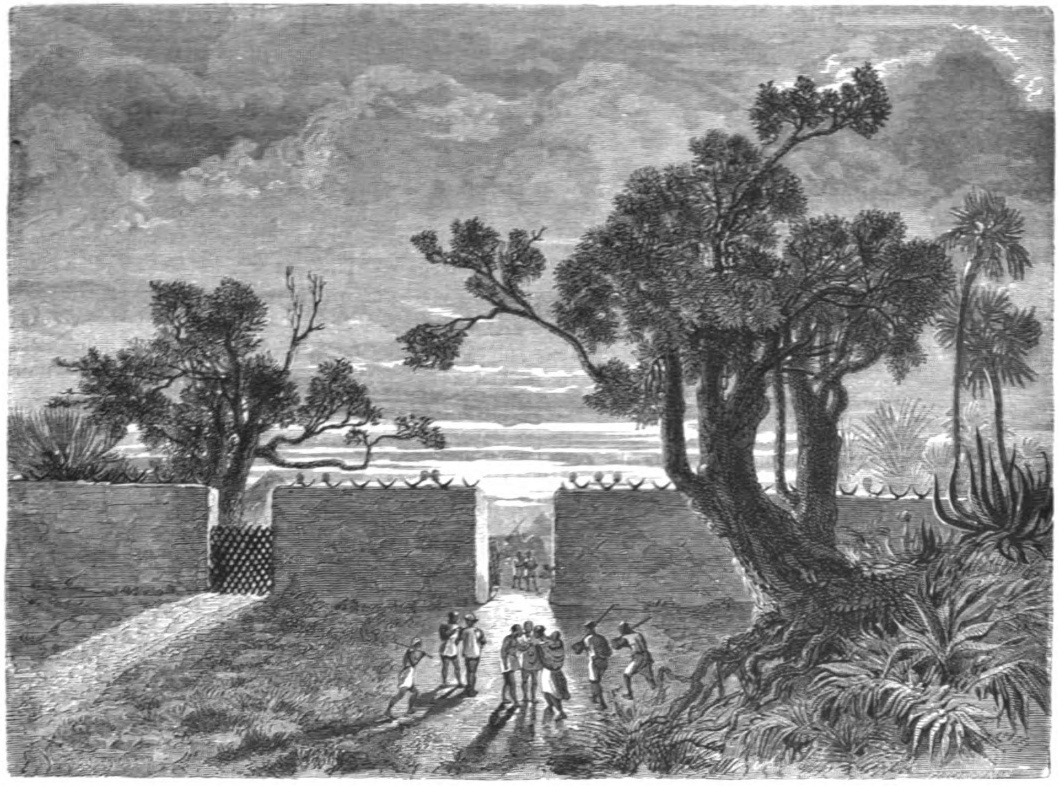
Gates of Abomey depicted in the Le Tour du Monde by Valentin Foulquier in 1863

Abomey was founded in the 17th century as the capital of the Kingdom of Dahomey (1600–1904), on the site of the former village of Kana. Traditional legends state that the town was founded by Do-Aklin, a son of the king of Allada who ventured north to found his own kingdom; the name is thought to come from Danhomé, also spelled Danxomé, meaning "belly of Dan", Dan being the original chief of the village.

Dahomey expanded rapidly in the 1700s, absorbing many of the surrounding kingdoms, and growing rich from the slave trade. In the late 18th century, Abomey was surrounded only by dry ditch which was crossed by bridges that were protected by a garrison. The royal palaces were fortified with a nearly square mudbrick wall that was 20 feet high. The flanks reached almost 1 mile as blockhouses were built on each wall. By the 1840s it had an estimated population of 24,000.

After several attempts, the French conquered the kingdom on 16 November 1892, prompting King Béhanzin to torch the city and flee northward. Thereafter the town declined in importance, a process hastened when the French built the new administrative centre of Bohicon immediately to the east. Today, the city is of less importance, but is still popular with tourists and as a centre for crafts. Since 1985, Abomey has maintained its complex of royal palaces as a UNESCO World Heritage Site.

== The Royal Palaces of Abomey ==
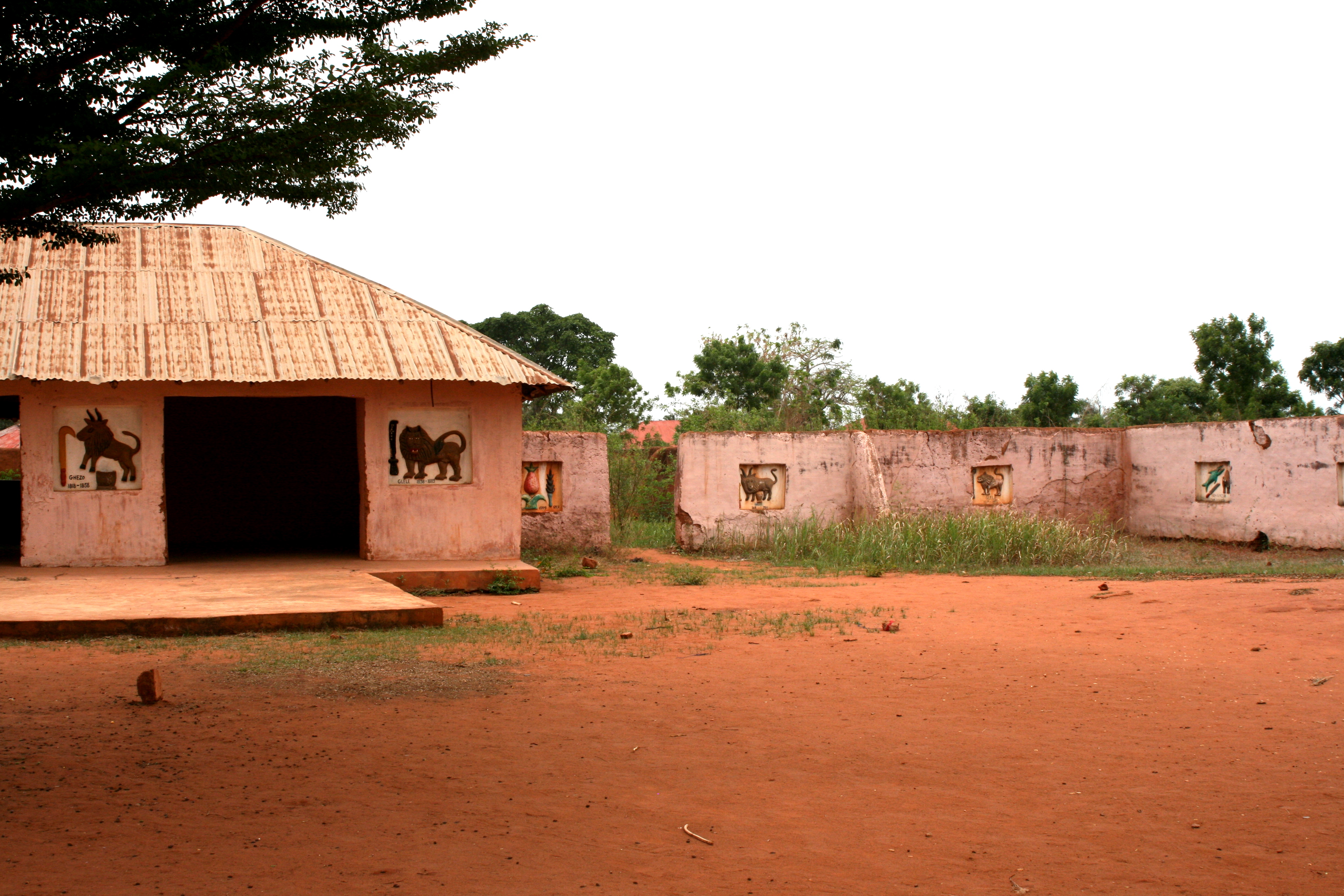
Royal Palaces of Abomey

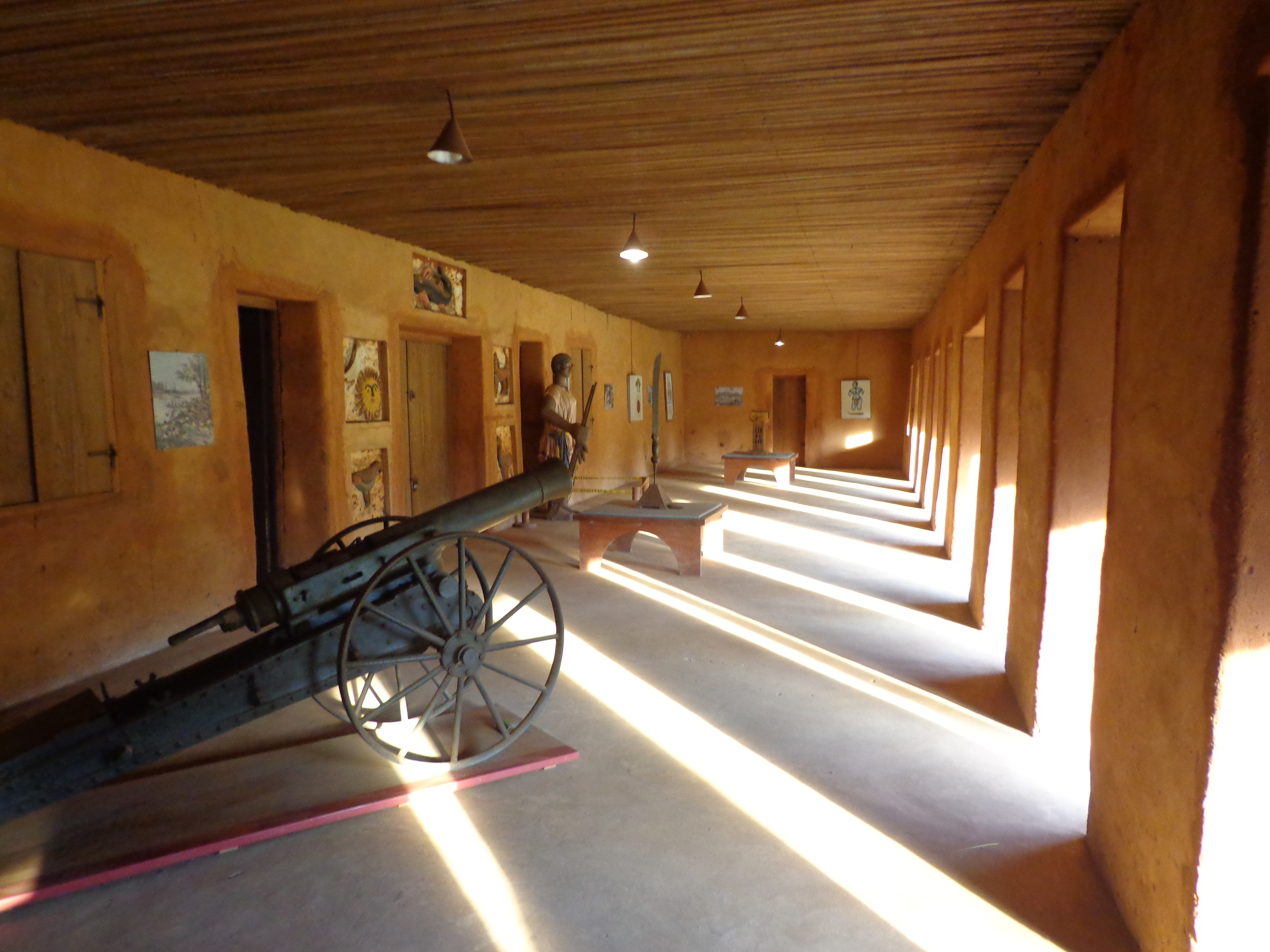
Exhibition, Royal Palaces of Abomey

The Royal Palaces of Abomey are a group of earthen structures built by the Fon people between the mid-17th and late 19th Centuries. One of the most famous and historically significant traditional sites in West Africa, the palaces form a UNESCO World Heritage Sites.

During the reign of Béhanzin, the palaces covered some 44ha and it was surrounded by a 10 meter high wall reaching 4 km in length. Only 2 of the original 12 palace survived the 1892 burning by Béhanzin, Dahomey's last king. The French colonial administration rebuilt the town and connected it with the coast by a railroad.

When UNESCO designated the royal palaces of Abomey as a World Heritage Site in 1985 it stated:

From 1625 to 1900 twelve kings succeeded one another at the head of the powerful Kingdom of Abomey. With the exception of King Akaba, who used a separate enclosure, they each had their palaces built within the same cob-wall area, in keeping with previous palaces as regards the use of space and materials. The royal palaces of Abomey are a unique reminder of this vanished kingdom.

From 1993, 50 of the 56 bas-reliefs that formerly decorated the walls of King Glèlè (now termed the "Salle des Bijoux") have been located and replaced on the rebuilt structure. The bas-reliefs carry an iconographic program expressing the history and power of the Fon people.

=== Threats ===
As reported by UNESCO, on 21 January 2009 the Royal Palaces of Abomey suffered from a fire "which destroyed several buildings." The fire was the most recent disaster to have plagued the site, coming after a powerful tornado damaged the site in 1984.

== Demographics ==
Year	Population
1860s	24 000
1979	38 412
1992	65 725
2002	77 997
2008 (estimate)	87 344
2012	90 195

== Gallery ==
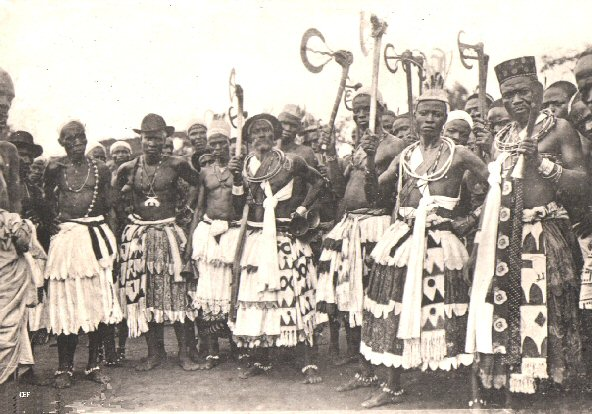
"Important witchdoctors" (1908)

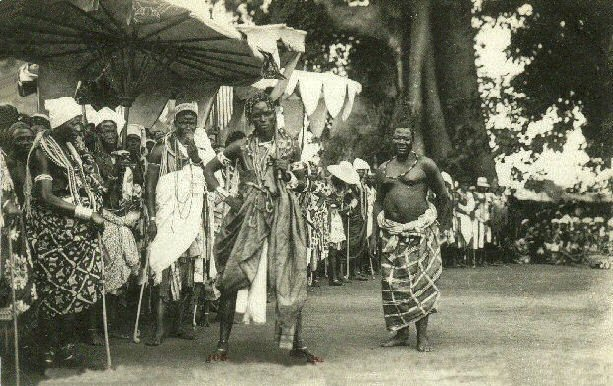
Dance of the Fon chiefs 1908

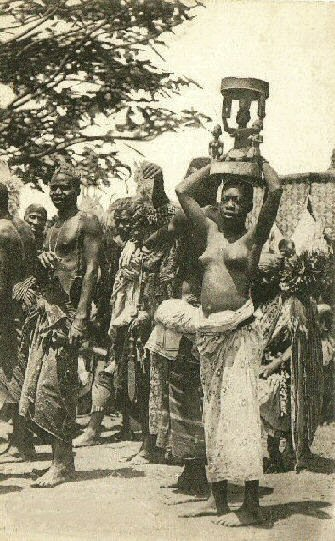
Young girl with wooden statue of mystic chair (1908)

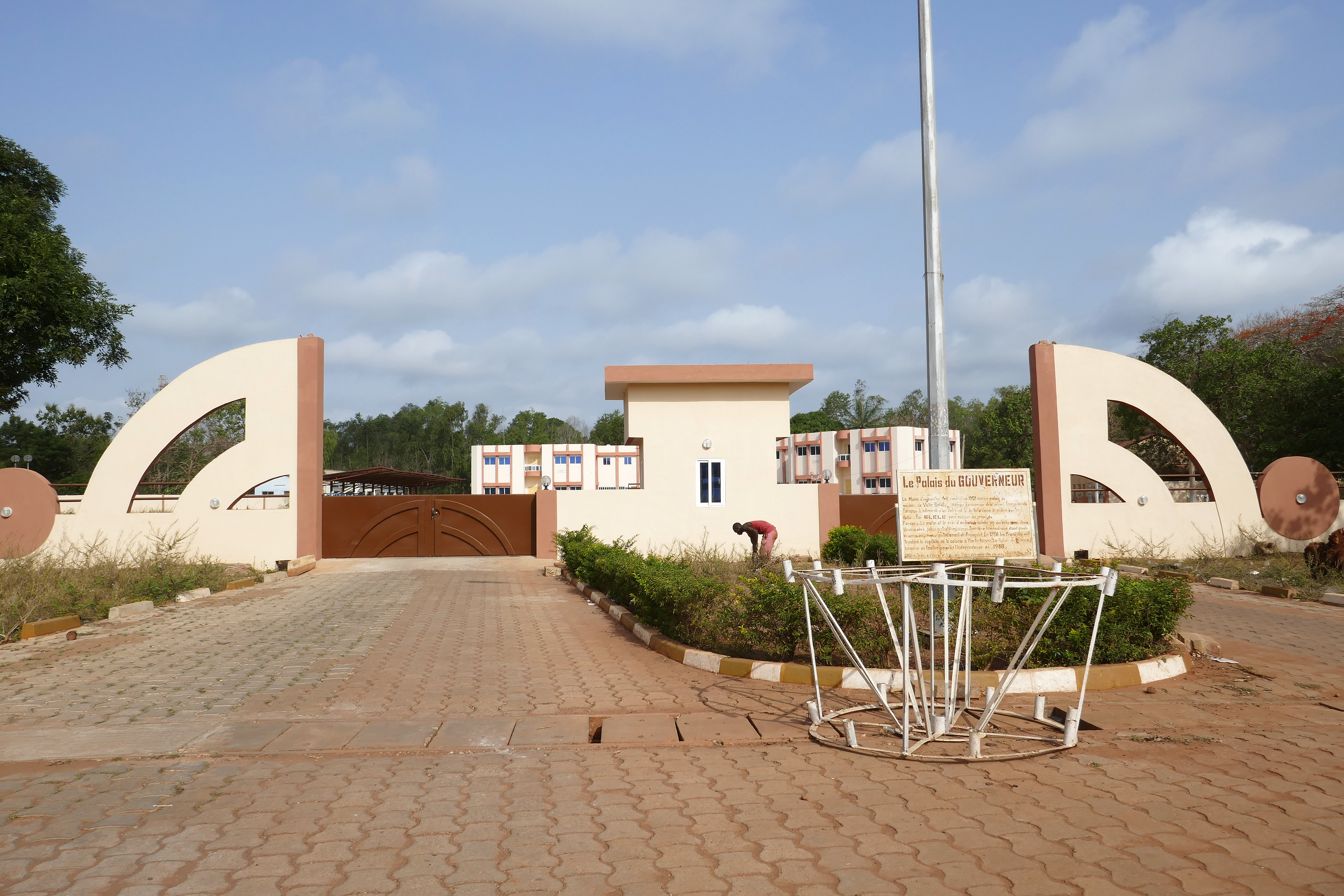
Town Hall, located in the former Governor's Palace

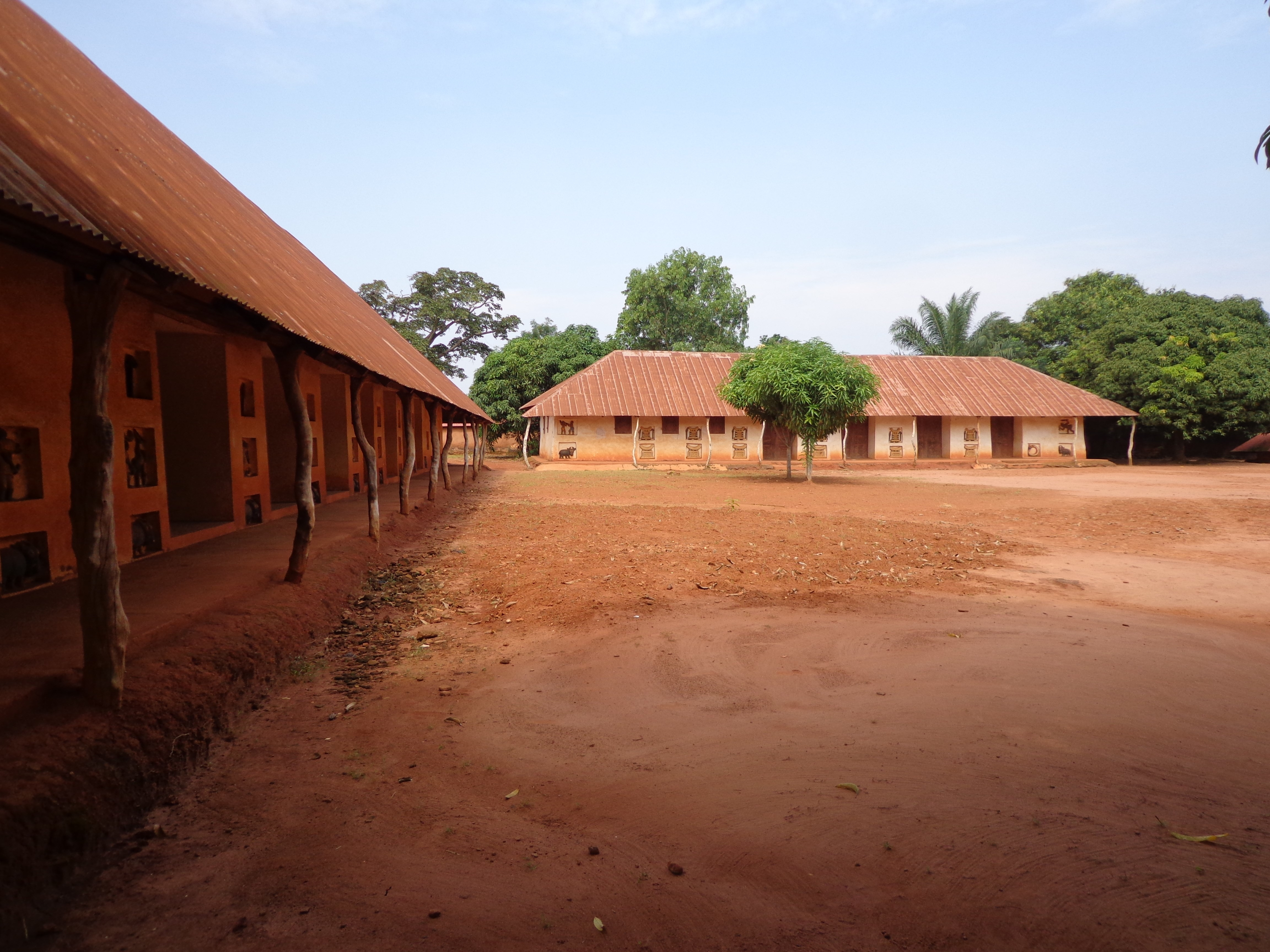
One of the royal palaces.

== See also ==
- The city is twinned with Albi, France.
