= Alana collection =

Private art collection in Delaware, US

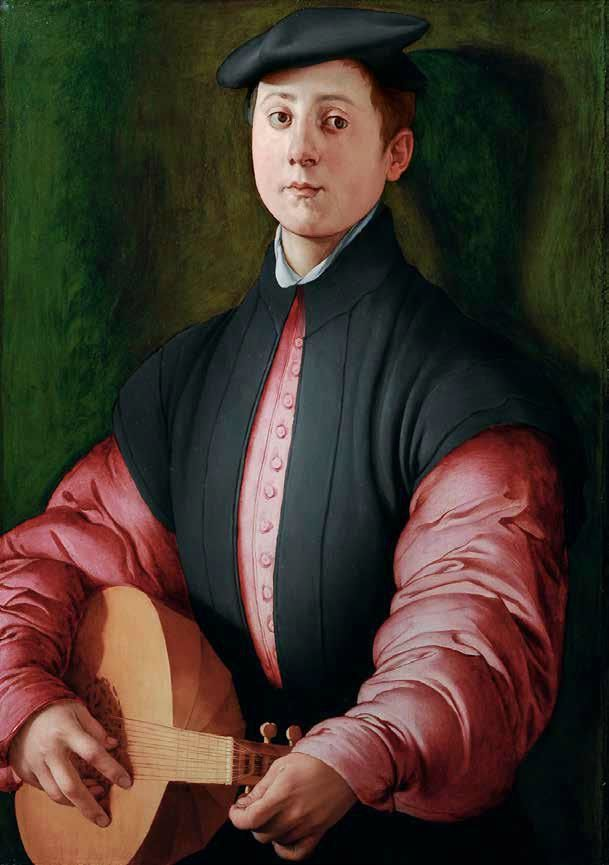
Pontormo, The Lute Player (c. 1529–1530), oil on panel, Alana collection, 2017. "A painting by a minor master close to The Lute Player by Pontormo or the Madonna by Fra Angelico, which I rank among the greatest masterpieces in my collection." — Álvaro Saieh.

The Alana collection is a private collection of paintings, owned by the Chilean economist Álvaro Saieh and his wife Ana Guzmán and kept at their residence in Newark, Delaware. The couple have been collecting since the late 1990s, starting with Italian 'primitives' and Renaissance paintings and later broadening to Baroque art. The collection is described in three volumes:

- The Alana collection: Italian paintings from the 13th to 15th century (2009)
- Italian paintings and sculptures from the fourteenth to sixteenth century (2011)
- Italian paintings from the 14th to 16th century (2014).

== Works in the collection ==
From 13 September 2019 to 20 January 2020., 75 pieces from the collection were loaned to the musée Jacquemart-André in Paris This was the first (and according to Carlo Falciani possibly the last) time they had been displayed outside their owners' residence

Other than El Greco's The Entombment (exhibited at the Grand Palais in Paris in 2019-2020), the following works formed part of the Musée Jacquemart-André exhibition:

== Cimabue's Mocking of Christ ==
According to Carole Blumenfeld in la Gazette de l'Hôtel Drouot, the couple were also the purchasers of Cimabue's Mocking of Christ via the Italian art dealer Fabrizio Moretti, sold for 24.18 million Euros by an auction house in Senlis, Oise on 27 October 2019. Álvaro Saieh had effectively resigned from the board of the Metropolitan Museum of Art just before the sale in order to bid freely on the work. The work was classified a national treasure on 23 December 2019 by France's Ministry of Culture, banning its export from French territory for 30 months to allow the Louvre time to raise enough money to acquire it. If it had not done so, an export license would have been granted to the work and it would have joined the Alana collection.

== Doubts on authenticity of Saint Cosmas ==
At the end of the musée Jacquemart-André exhibition, France's Office central de lutte contre le trafic des biens culturels seized Saint Cosmas by Bronzino on a ruling by judge Aude Buresi on instruction in the affair in fake historic paintings that had been flooding the international art market for several years. It was thought that the painting could have been a painting put into circulation by Giuliano Ruffini against whom a European arrest warrant was issued in May 2019. Another was taken out against his son Mathieu and the painter Lino Frongia was arrested in September 2019.

The work entered the Alana collection in 2011, it was first exhibited in 2010 in a Bronzino retrospective at Florence's Palazzo Strozzi organised by Carlo Falciani and Philippe Costamagna, the latter being a Florentine art specialist and curator at the Fesch Museum in Ajaccio. Under questioning, Costamagna stated that he had been shown the painting in Giuliano Ruffini's apartment on rue Saint-Honoré and confirmed its attribution to Bronzino due to several pentimenti before it was exhibited in Florence and published twice with Carlo Falciani. The curator also clarified that the painting seemed to belong to Spanish art dealers, who were also present when Costamagna viewed the work at Ruffini's. Ruffini was confirmed as the discoverer of the long-lost work and yet his name did not appear in the catalogue of the musée Jacquemart-André exhibition - the provenance only mentioned Juan Lamella in London and H. Wirth in Zurich in 2009 before its acquisition by the Alana collection in 2011. Representatives of the Alana collection later clarified that the work had been purchased in 2011 from the Derek Johns Gallery in London.

After interviewing Vincent Noce of The Art Newspaper, Didier Rykner of La Tribune de l'art stated "I never claimed that the work was a fake. To advance such a point of view would be very dangerous even before any historigraphic or scientific examination. I had neither the expertise nor even the right, if I thought so, which was not the case, to advance such an opinion. I do know that it was presented at Ruffini's home. And that story does not hold. I leave it there for the moment and I do not believe that my paper would suggest otherwise.".

Rykner added that Costamagna had met the painting's Spanish owners at Ruffini's apartment and that it had been anonymous until Ruffini identified it as a lost part of Bronzino's Deposition (musée des Beaux-Arts et d'Archéologie de Besançon). He added that "the only argument - that this painting had been seen at Ruffini's home - is not sufficient to prove it was a fake. Fakes of this provenance are always based on drawn compositions, but this composition was absolutely unknown. It is impossible that a forger could have invented this hand position, which is a pure creation of Bronzino's. The painting, which has several re-paintings, and visible pentimenti and an underdrawing. It was restored for the exhibition in Florence by the same restorer, Rita Alzeni, as the Bronzino works. I immediately recognised Bronzino's hand, a forger could not invent this".

Rykner also questioned "the legitimacy of a seizure in France of a painting acquired overseas, by a foreigner collector, and which does not seem to affect the French art market". He argued that the risk of facing similar treatment could discourage foreign private collectors loaning their works to French museums.

== Bibliography ==
- Boskovits, Miklós, ed. (2009). The Alana collection. Vol. I - Italian paintings from the 13th to 15th century. Florence: Polistampa. ISBN 978-88-596-0529-4.
- Boskovits, Miklós, ed. (2011). The Alana collection. Vol. II - Italian paintings and sculptures from the fourteenth to sixteenth century. Florence: Centro Di. ISBN 978-88-7038-489-5..
- Chiodo, Sonia; Padovani, Serena, eds. (2014). The Alana collection. Vol. III - Italian paintings from the 14th to 16th century. Florence: Mandragora. ISBN 978-88-7461-217-8..
- Falciani, Carlo; Curie, Pierre, eds. (2019). La Collection Alana - Chefs-d'œuvre de la peinture italienne (in French). Bruxelles: Fonds Mercator. ISBN 978-94-6230-154-2. - published for the musée Jacquemart-André exhibition (13 September 2019 – 20 January 2020)
- "La collection Alana. 13 septembre 2019 - 20 janvier 2020. Musée Jacquemart-André. Carlo Falciani, historien d'art et commissaire de l'exposition". 19 September 2019.
