= International Inventories Programme =

Programme for Kenyan cultural heritage

The International Inventories Programme (IIP) is an international research and database project for investigating objects pertaining to the cultural heritage of Kenya that are held in cultural institutions like ethnographic museums across the globe. The programme is jointly run by the National Museums of Kenya in Nairobi, the Rautenstrauch-Joest Museum in Cologne and the Weltkulturen Museum in Frankfurt a. M., both in Germany. To establish a direct relation to contemporary cultural activities both in Kenya and in Germany, the multi-disciplinary arts groups The Nest Collective (Kenya) and SHIFT Collective in Germany and France are further members of the IIP. - The programme and its projects are supported by the Goethe-Institut - German cultural centre in Kenya - and the German Federal Cultural Foundation.

== Background and international cooperation ==
The IIP was publicly launched in 2018, and was described by Quartz Africa magazine as "a movement to investigate the cultural artifacts stolen and kept outside the country’s borders (...) exploring where in the West they are actually housed, who holds the agency to demand their repatriation, and how their historical and cultural legacy can be harnessed for sustainable and creative development.”

As much of Kenya's cultural heritage is inaccessible both for the Kenyan public as well as for academics worldwide, the IIP aims to narrow gaps relating to knowledge about such cultural objects. Regarding object inventories in Western collections, the programme noted "that some of these inventories sometimes lack information or contain data errors with regards to acquisition modalities, provenance, context and purpose of the objects. Due to lack of a sharing framework between institutions, researchers and collectors, these data errors perpetuate misrepresentation and mis-attribution of these cultural objects."

Resulting from collaboration between researchers and museum staff in Kenya and Germany, some of the objects in German museums have been documented online, including new information about their provenance and original use.

Njoki Ngumi, a member of Nest collective, was quoted in an article by the magazine Artnet News: “A lot of the research was written as though Black people would never look at it, or dare to have opinions about it. - We’ve had to sift through a lot of idly racist opinions and thoughts, then have to reflect on them in order to find even shreds of information about our ancestors and their contemporaries.”

== Aims and activities ==
In the context of the larger debates on colonial histories, the overarching aim of the IIP is to "decolonize the discourse on restitution by distributing African perspectives and positions underrepresented in international discussion."

As stated on the programme's webpage, the IIP strives to accomplish the following aims:

- "Build exchange relations and strengthen collaboration and cooperation between NMK and key cultural institutions and collectors who possess and hold in custody Kenyan objects as part of their collections,
- Generate a comprehensive inventory of Kenyan artifacts and cultural objects held in public institutions abroad
- Exchange knowledge and information which will help to properly identify, label, store and display said objects"

As Nanette Snoep, director of the Rautenstrauch-Joest Museum stated in an interview, the IIP is "not just about restitution, but also about cooperation and gaining knowledge on the objects." Joining other projects in the efforts of regaining African cultural heritage in the global North, IIP also has established a cooperation with the Open Restitution Project Africa.

=== Object Movement Dialogues ===
Accompanying and documenting the discussions between the IIP and international researchers, a number of 'Object Movement Dialogues' were held and published online. In September 2019, one of the participants was the French art historian Bénédicte Savoy, co-author of the report on the restitution of African cultural heritage, who placed the IIP in the wider context of the ongoing discussion in Europe, following the recommendation of timely and mutually agreed permanent return of African cultural heritage in Western collections.

=== First public exhibition ===
On 17 March 2021, the programme's first public exhibition, entitled 'Invisible Inventories - Questioning Kenyan Collections in Western Museums' was launched at the National Museum of Kenya. Combining scholarly inquiry, artworks and activism, the exhibition wants to prompt the question how to make objects taken from Kenya to museums and collections in the global North present again in contemporary Kenya.

To make the absence of these invisible cultural objects obvious, ten empty display cabinets were presented in an installation called 'Displaying Absence'. This contribution by the contemporary artists involved in the IIP is meant to represent objects missing from Kenya, but found in German museums. Further, a sound installation about the so-called Man-Eaters of Tsavo reflects on the consequences of the absence of cultural objects in a poetic way. From May 2021 to the beginning of 2022, this exhibition is scheduled to travel to the participating museums in Cologne and Frankfurt.

=== Database for locating Kenyan cultural objects ===
To facilitate the exchange of information and inquiry, a database of cultural objects held by 30 institutions worldwide was established. As of November 2020, it provided the location and information for more than 32,000 objects.

As an accompanying publication to the exhibition, IIP also published a magazine in English and German, available both in print as well as online.

"...for the first time, Invisible Inventories opens up a public and open platform for Kenyan knowledge, experiences and ideas about this controversial and emotional topic. Its aim is to decolonize the discourse on restitution by distributing African perspectives and positions underrepresented in international discussions, thus contributing to a larger, much-needed debate on colonial histories, and how societies can negotiate and learn from them more honestly."

— International Inventories Programme

== See also ==
- Culture of Kenya
- Culture of Africa
- Report on the restitution of African cultural heritage
