= Museum of Black Civilisations =

Museum in Senegal

Museum of Black Civilizations
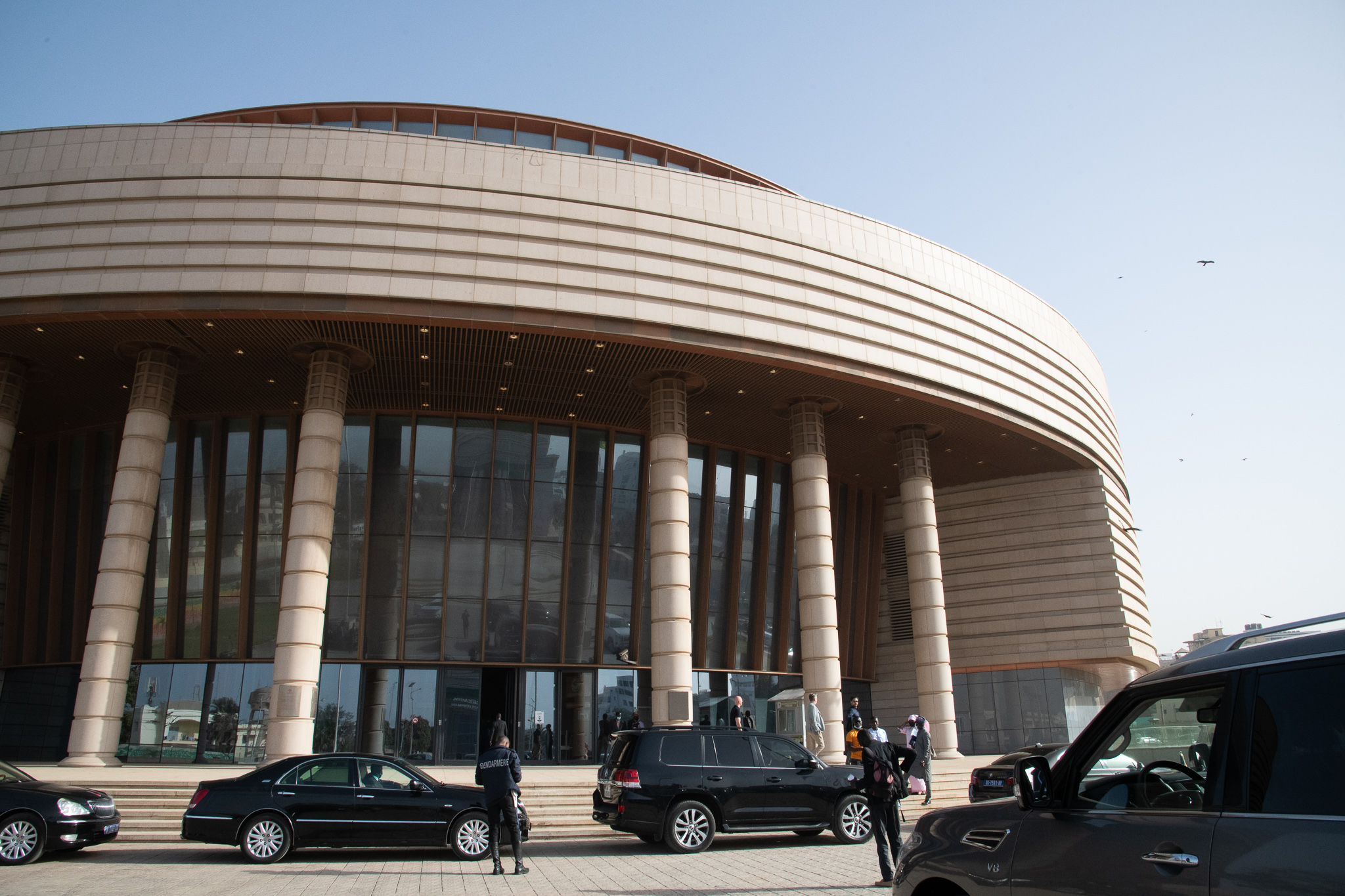
- Established: 21 December 2011
- Location: Dakar, Dakar-Plateau, Senegal
- Website: Official website

The Museum of Black Civilisations (French: Musée des civilisations noires) is a national museum in Dakar, Senegal, that opened on 6 December 2018.

It is directed by Hamady Bocoum, an archaeologist and researcher at Cheikh-Anta-Diop University. The museum was conceived with the goal of highlighting "Africa's contribution to the world's cultural and scientific patrimony." According to Bocoum, it is particularly important to remember that "ironworking was discovered in Africa 2500 years before Christ."

The museum was on the list of "ultramodern museums" compiled by Felwine Sarr and Bénédicte Savoy in their report on the restitution of African cultural heritage Rapport sur la restitution du patrimoine culturel africain. Vers une nouvelle éthique relationnelle (en: The Restitution of African Cultural Heritage: Toward a New Relational Ethics) submitted in November 2018 to the president of France.

== History ==
Opened on 6 December 2018, it is the realisation of the vision of Léopold Sédar Senghor, Senegal's First President, to create a museum that would represent the histories and contemporary cultures of Black people everywhere. The museum cost an estimated $30,000,000 to construct. The museum has requested the repatriation of African artworks, given that up to 95 percent of Africa's cultural heritage is held outside Africa by major museums. The Musée du quai Branly – Jacques Chirac in Paris, for example, holds 70,000 objects from Sub-Saharan Africa. The museum was recognised by Time magazine as one of the "World's 100 Greatest Places of 2019".

The original vision for the Musée des civilisations noires dates to the 1970s, and was exhibited in the Museum of Modern Art exhibition "Architects of Liberation: Modernism in Western Africa."

== Collections ==
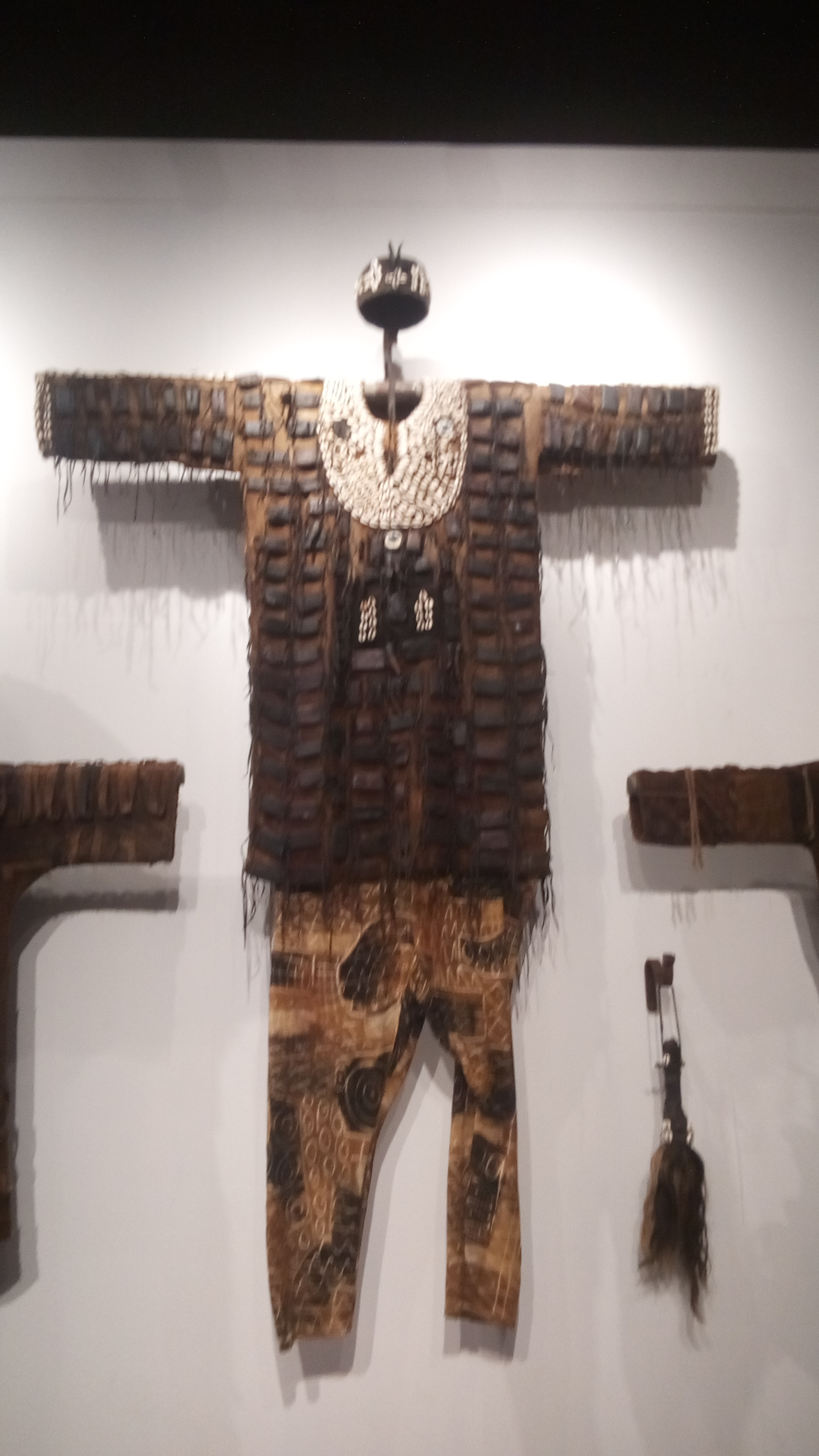
Armor of Dogon hunter

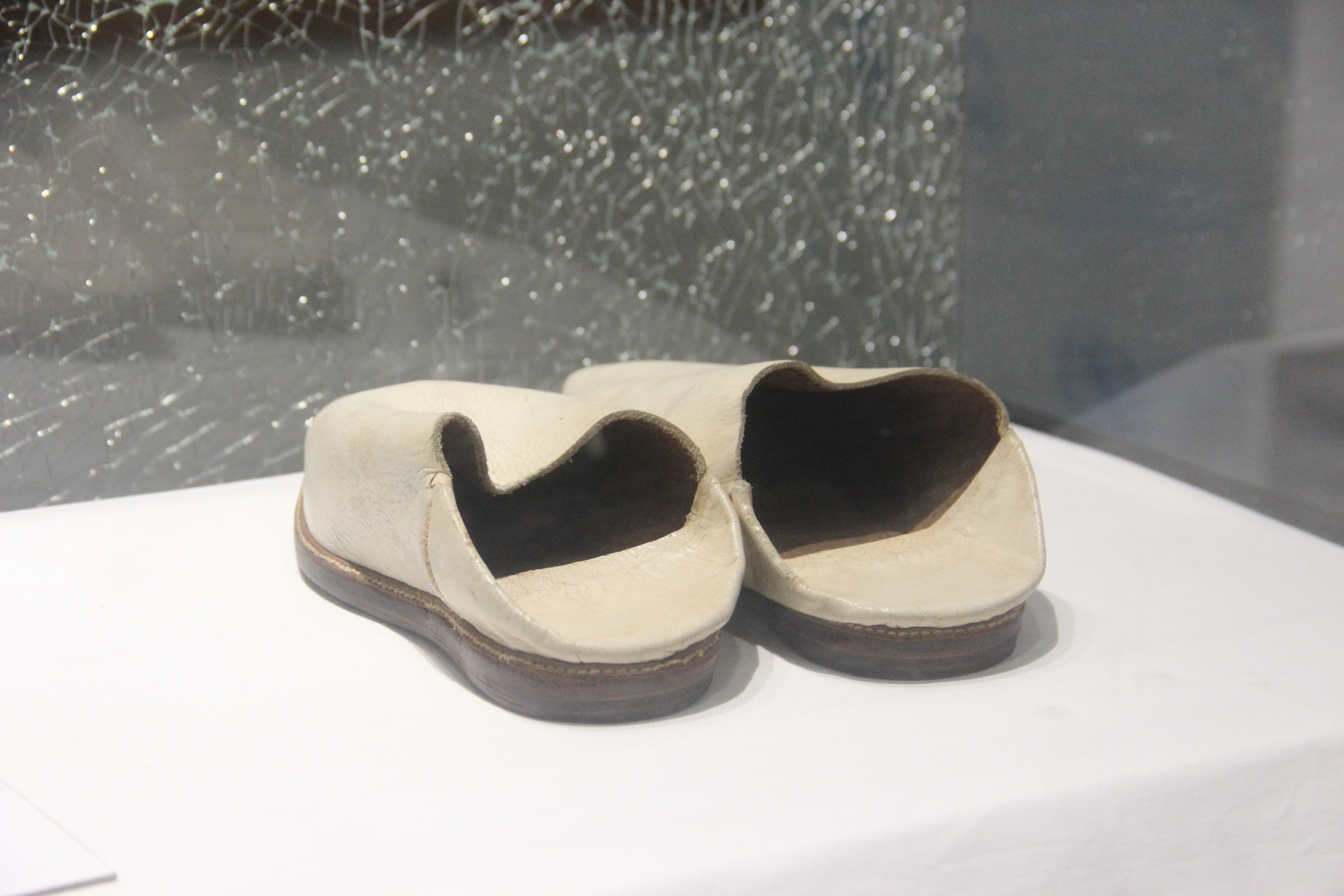
Serigne Babacar Sy's babouches

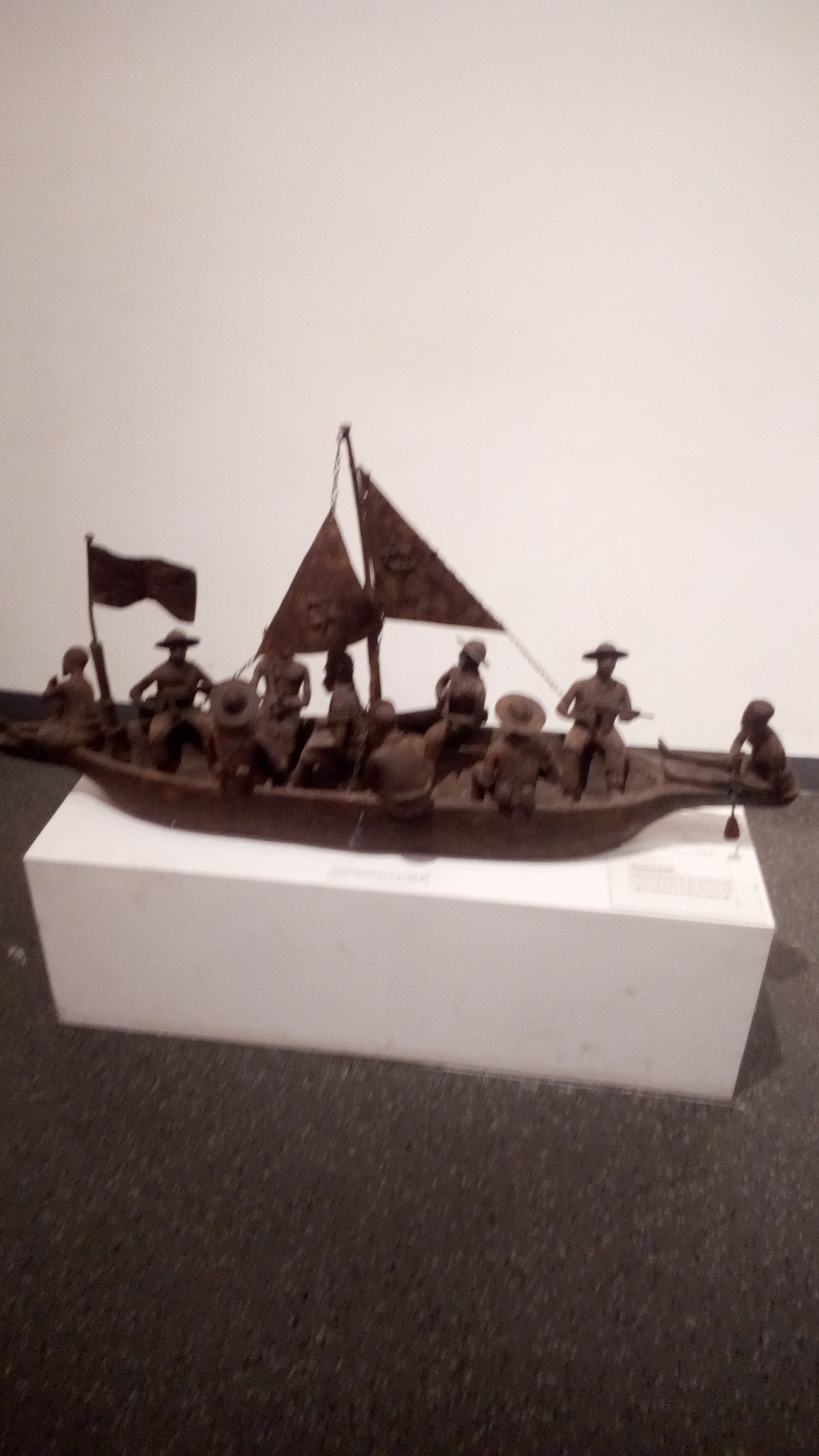
Sculpture of Ovonramwen being exiled
