= Didier Rykner =

French journalist

- Born: 15 December 1961 (age 64); Paris, France
- Education: AgroParisTech; École du Louvre; Sciences Po
- Occupations: Journalist; art historian; author
- Known for: Founder of La Tribune de l'art

Didier Rykner (born 15 December 1961) is a French journalist and art historian, most notable as the founder of the online magazine La Tribune de l'art, covering news on western art history and heritage from the Middle Ages to the 1930s. ·

== Life ==
Born in Paris, he studied agronomical engineering at the Institut national agronomique Paris-Grignon, graduating in 1982. He received his diploma from the École du Louvre in 1987 before studying at the Institut d'études politiques de Paris.

In 2007, to oppose the creation of the Louvre Abu Dhabi and Louvre Lens and cooperation with the High Museum of Art in the USA, he started the petition "Les musées ne sont pas à vendre" ("Museums are not for sale") - it received over 3000 signatures.

As early as 2011 he adjudged that there were gaps in the maintenance of places of worship in Paris. In 2018, after Bénédicte Savoy and Felwine Sarr completed Report on the restitution of African cultural heritage for president Emmanuel Macron on repatriation of items taken during the colonial period, Rykner severely criticised its recommendations, such as the return of all items which had no proof that they were given with explicit consent.).

As of 2022 the SaccageParis movement uses social media to publicise its struggle to preserve Paris's heritage. Around the same date Rykner denounced the city council's management of environmental and heritage issues.

Beyond Paris, he opposes advertising banners and wind-turbines on heritage grounds. He regularly opposes France's Ministry of Culture and elected officials who he accuses of selling off their heritage or destroying a living environment.

== Works ==
- Le Spleen d'Apollon, Editions Nicolas Chaudun, 2008, 141 p. ·
- La Restitution des œuvres d'art : solutions et impasses, Fernand Hazan, 2011, 112 p. with Corinne Hershkovitch
- La Tribune de l'Art, Gourcuff Gradenigo, 2013 , 208 p.
- La Disparition de Paris, Paris, Les Belles Lettres, 2022, 240 p. (Note: In it he presents himself as the defender of Paris's urban heritage against what he argues are the city council's excesses in preserving it. ·)
- Notre-Dame, une affaire d'État. Paris: Les Belles Lettres. 2023. ISBN 978-2251454955..
- Mauvais genre au musée, Paris, Les Belles lettres, 280 p., 2025 ISBN 978-2251456782

== Sources ==
- 'Didier Rykner monte à la tribune (entretien)', Louvr'Boîte : le journal des élèves de l'école du Louvre, no 8, December 2011, p. 20-25 (ISSN 1969-9611)

== External links (in French) ==
- Harry Bellet, 'Didier Rykner : le gardien du temple', Le Monde, 18 January 2007
- France Culture, Quels pouvoirs dans l'art ?, 3 December 2016
- https://www.radiofrance.fr/personnes/didier-rykner
