= Adele Rautenstrauch =

German patron of the arts and donor

Anna Maria Adele Rautenstrauch, née Joest (born 23 February 1850 in Cologne; died 30 December 1903 in Neustrelitz) was a German patron and benefactor. She donated the inherited ethnological collection of her brother Wilhelm Joest, which still forms the basis of the Rautenstrauch-Joest Museum, to the City of Cologne.

== Life ==
Adele Joest was born in Cologne on 23 February 1850 as the daughter of Maria Wilhelmina Eduarda Joest, née Leiden, and the sugar manufacturer Eduard Joest. In 1872 she married the merchant Eugen Rautenstrauch (1842-1900), who continued her father's import business of animal skins. The Rautenstrauch couple collected antique and ethnological exhibits. Adele Rautenstrauch's younger brother Wilhelm undertook numerous trips around the world and thus built up an extensive ethnological collection. After his death in Ureparapara in 1898, his sister inherited her brother's extraordinary collection, which she had brought to Cologne. Together with her husband Eugen–who had the power of disposal over his wife's inheritance according to the German Civil Code–she donated her brother's collection, which comprised over 3,400 exhibits, to the City of Cologne on 28 June 1899, in order to make it accessible to the public and especially to students at the commercial college.

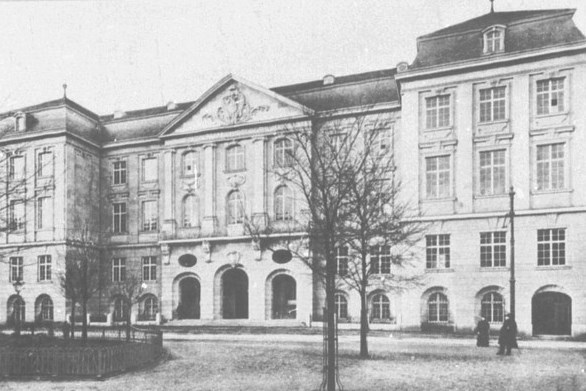
Rautenstrauch-Joest Museum on Ubierring, 1910

After Eugen Rautenstrauch had died on 18 May 1900, she donated the capital for the construction of a new ethnological museum in memory of her husband on 1 August 1900 in the amount of 250,000 Reichsmark with the condition that the new museum should bear the name Rautenstrauch-Joest-Museum. At the same time, she created the financial conditions for the employment of a renowned museum director. She donated the salary for the first museum director Willy Foy for ten years. Shortly before her sudden death in December 1903, Adele Rautenstrauch announced that she would have the new museum building on the Ubierring built at her expense using the building fund. She died a few days later in Neustrelitz.

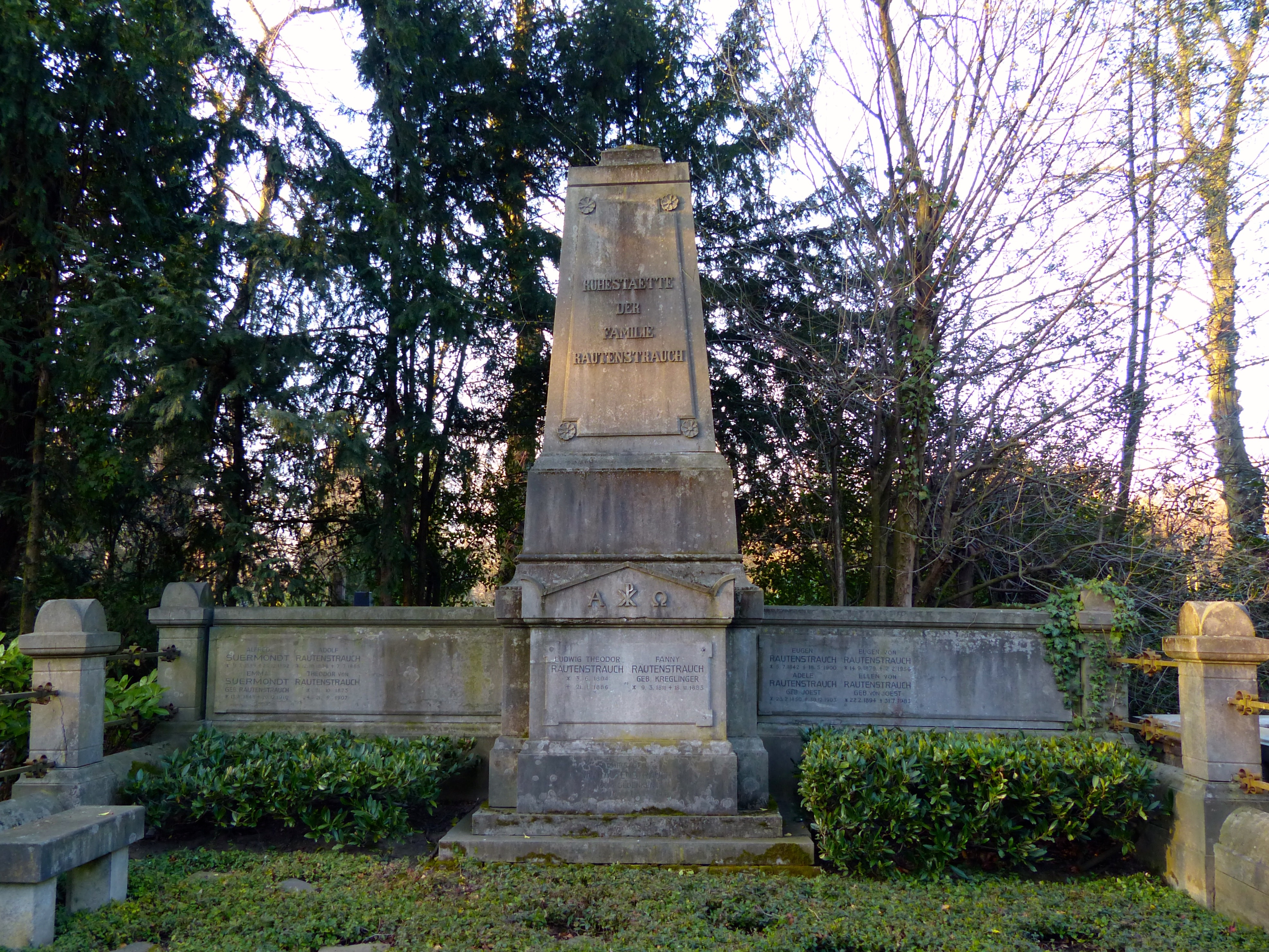
Tomb of the Rautenstrauch family at the Melaten cemetery

After her death in Mecklenburg, Adele Rautenstrauch was transferred to Cologne and buried at Melaten Cemetery on the so-called Millionenallee (between HWG and Lit. P).

The couple had three children, Theodor Damian (1873-1907), owner of Birlinghoven Palace, Marie Emma Adele Wilhelmine, later Countess von Bernstorff (1876-1945) and Eugen Adolf Wilhelm von Rautenstrauch (1879-1956), partner in the Delbrück bank, v. d. Heydt & Co.

The children had the museum construction carried out at the family's expense. On 12 November 1906, the museum building on the Ubierring initiated by Adele Rautenstrauch was opened in the presence of her son Eugen and her son-in-law Georg Ernst von Bernstorff.
