= The Fountain of Latona =

2022 non-fiction book by Thomas F. Hedin

The Fountain of Latona: Louis XIV, Charles Le Brun, and the Gardens of Versailles
- Cover
- Author: Thomas F. Hedin
- Language: English
- Series: Penn Studies in Landscape Architecture
- Subject: Fountain of Latona, Gardens of Versailles, Charles Le Brun, Louis XIV
- Genre: Art history
- Publisher: University of Pennsylvania Press
- Publication date: 2022
- Media type: Hardcover, e-book
- Pages: 190
- ISBN: 978-0-8122-5375-7 (hardcover)
- OCLC: 1295764682
- Dewey Decimal: 720.9409/032

The Fountain of Latona: Louis XIV, Charles Le Brun, and the Gardens of Versailles is a 2022 book by the American art historian Thomas Hedin. It was published by the University of Pennsylvania Press in the Penn Studies in Landscape Architecture series.

The work is a study of the original Fountain of Latona (1666–70), a scenic fountain in the gardens of Versailles that depicted the Ovidian myth of Latona and the Lycean peasants. Hedin argues that the fountain was the central panel of a unified allegorical program along the western axis of the gardens, and that it served as both a panegyric to Louis XIV and a manifesto for the superiority of modern French art. The book challenges the widely held interpretation, advanced by Nathan Whitman in 1969, that the fountain was an allegory of the Fronde, the civil uprisings that roiled Paris from 1648 to 1653. Hedin uses contemporary literary accounts, archival sources, and academic debates at the Académie royale de peinture et de sculpture to reconstruct the fountain's original appearance and meaning, which he argues were obscured by Jules Hardouin-Mansart's 1687 reconstruction.

The publication of the book coincided with the restoration of the Fountain of Apollo in 2022.

== Background ==
Hedin is Emeritus Professor of Art History at the University of Minnesota Duluth, where he taught from 1973 until his retirement in 2006. His interest in the sculpture of the gardens of Versailles began as a student at the University of Chicago, and in 1983 he published a monograph on the Marsy brothers, the sculptors of the Latona fountain. In 2008, he co-authored, with Robert Berger, Diplomatic Tours in the Gardens of Versailles under Louis XIV (Penn Studies in Landscape Architecture). He held fellowships at Dumbarton Oaks and published a series of articles on the early gardens in Versalia, the journal of the Société des Amis de Versailles, and in other French and English-language publications. In a 2023 interview with the Chroniques des Amis de Versailles, Hedin said he was drawn to a fixed point just above the retaining wall of the Fer-à-Cheval, from which the original fountain "was seen in purest form," and described Versailles as "a living, evolving organism, not unlike a rare archaeological site."

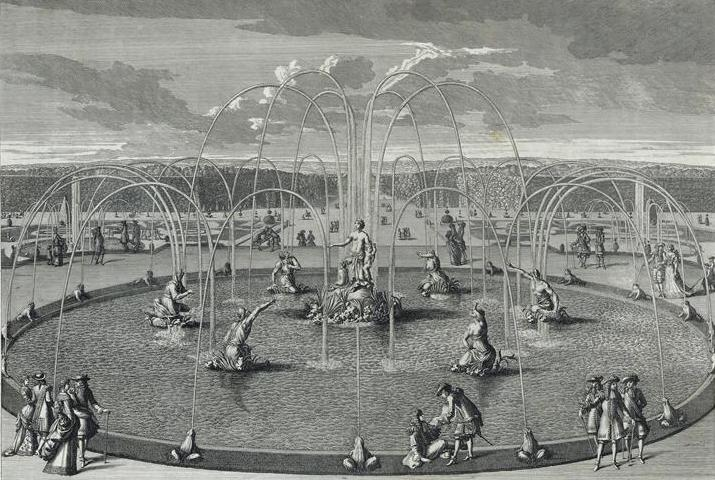

== Summary ==
Hedin's subject is the original Fountain of Latona, created between 1666 and 1670 for the gardens of Versailles and not the tiered marble cone erected by Jules Hardouin-Mansart in 1687, which visitors see today.

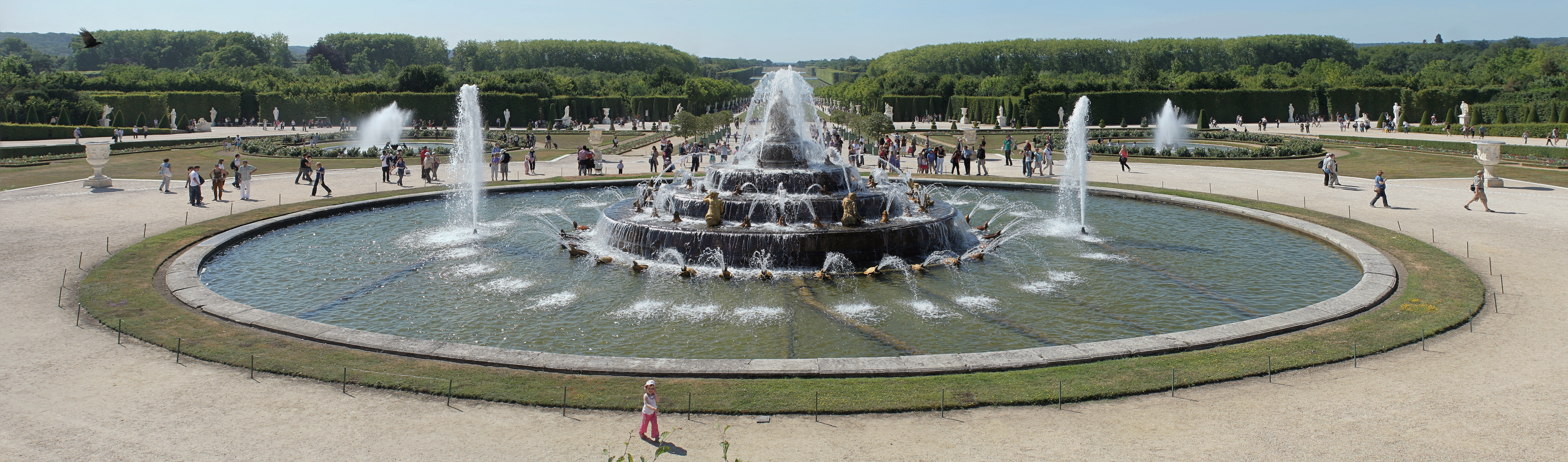
The tiered marble cone erected by Jules Hardouin-Mansart in 1687, which visitors see today

The original depicted Ovid's myth (Metamorphoses VI: 313–81) of the Titaness Latona, denied water by Lycean peasants, who are transformed into frogs as divine punishment. The figures were arranged on or just above the water's surface in an oval basin, without architectural armature.

The author describes the material conditions of the site, in terms of landscape, water scarcity, hydraulic engineering. Hedin identifies Charles Le Brun, the premier peintre du roi, as the designer of the fountain and the brothers Gaspard and Balthazar Marsy as the sculptors who converted his designs into three-dimensions. He attributes the marble group specifically to Gaspard, on the strength of contemporary sources and Gaspard's 1669 lecture at the Académie royale.

Hedin dedicated three chapters to what he calls the fountain's "artistic and aesthetic provenance." He reads the composition as a sculptural narrative in the manner of Nicolas Poussin, applying the method Le Brun laid out in his 1667 conférence on Poussin's Israelites Gathering the Manna: figures whose postures, expressions, and groupings can be "read" sequentially. The six adult peasants are paired as married couples at successive stages of metamorphosis (a departure from Ovid, who describes only males) while the marble deities embody Le Brun's theories of bodily expression from the academic debates.

The book's culminating argument concerns the fountain's place along the western axis. The author thinks that Latona was the central panel of a "sculptural triptych," flanked by the Apollo fountain (Soleil levant) and the Grotto of Tethys (Soleil couchant). All three, he argues, formed an integrated allegory of Apollo (and by royal convention of Louis XIV) governing the day's cycle. The underlying concept is that the King, the Roi-Soleil, rises in the morning at one end of the western axis and rests and recuperates at night at the other end, after spreading his life-nurturing light to the world. Thanks to his inspiration and patronage, the artists and hydraulic engineers in the royal team managed to access the scarce natural supply of water and put it into meaningful form in the Latona fountain in the middle of the same axis. The aquatic reality of Versailles in the 1660s was identical to the aquatic iconography of the fountain: As the Lyceans were forced to surrender their precious water, so the coarse natural conditions of the gardens were likewise conquered. Underscoring the point is that the representation of this aquatic episode from the Metamorphoses seems to have been without precedent in the tradition of fountains, in France or any nation.

This reading leads Hedin to reject the interpretation, advanced by American art historian Nathan Whitman in 1969 and widely adopted since, that the fountain allegorized the Fronde (1648–53). Hedin objects that the Fronde thesis isolates Latona from the flanking panels, depends on an incorrect starting date, and finds no support in contemporary sources; Gérard Sabatier had mounted a similar challenge in 1999. Hedin instead considers the fountain as both a panegyric to Louis XIV and a manifesto for modern French art, a response to Gian Lorenzo Bernini's criticisms and a stake in the quarrel between the Ancients and the Moderns.

An appendix recounts how Mansart's 1687 reconstruction reversed the figures' orientation and dismantled the narrative coherence of Le Brun's tableau. Le Brun lived long enough to see the travesty.

== Critics ==
"Far from being a picture book, Hedin's is revisionist scholarship," wrote American scholar of French sculpture Guy Walton. He found the case against the Fronde thesis persuasive and accepted the revised chronology placing the fountain's conception in 1666, earlier than previously thought. Walton, echoing Hedin, thought that Mansart's later reconstruction obscured the original intentions of Le Brun and the Marsy brothers.

In her review in Garden History, Sally Jeffery described the book as "a detailed and thoughtful account of the Latona fountain and its context and background, derived from a meticulous examination and analysis of the available information." Jeffery called Hedin's rejection of the Fronde thesis as "a fascinating academic exercise in argument which leaves readers to form their own opinion."

Françoise de La Moureyre reviewed the work for French readers in La Tribune de l'art. She introduced Hedin as an American art historian who has passionately studied the Premier Versailles of the 1660s. Per La Moureyre, the author has never stopped bringing new findings to a period one might have thought well known, and that in his Latona he "brilliantly defends ideas never before proposed."
