= Report on the restitution of African cultural heritage =

Report on cultural relations between France and Africa south of the Sahara

The Restitution of African Cultural Heritage. Toward a New Relational Ethics
- Author: Felwine Sarr & Bénédicte Savoy
- Language: French original, English official translation
- Subject: Restitution of African art from French public collections
- Publisher: Philippe Rey/Seuil, Paris
- Publication date: 21 November 2018
- Media type: open access online document and commercially available book in French
- Pages: 89 in English version as pdf, plus annexes
- ISBN: 284876726X
- OCLC: 1077598452
- Website: http://restitutionreport2018.com

The Restitution of African Cultural Heritage. Toward a New Relational Ethics (in French: Rapport sur la restitution du patrimoine culturel africain. Vers une nouvelle éthique relationnelle) is a report written by Senegalese academic and writer Felwine Sarr and French art historian Bénédicte Savoy, first published online in November 2018 in a French original version and an authorised English translation.

Commissioned by the president of France, Emmanuel Macron, the aim of the report was to assess the history and present state of publicly owned French collections of African artworks originating from illicit or otherwise disputed acquisitions, as well as claims and a plan for subsequent steps for eventual restitutions. More specifically, the report also presents recommendations for the preparation of restitutions, such as international cultural cooperation, provenance research, legal frameworks, and ends with a list of the cultural objects involved, as well as ways to present them in the near future in African museums.

The commission of this report marks the first time a French president announced the restitution of African artefacts, and it has since prompted numerous debates and plans for a decolonization of museums in a number of countries.

In 2020, their report and its public response earned Bénédicte Savoy and Felwine Sarr the third place in the annual ranking of the "most influential people in the international art world", established by ArtReview magazine; and Time magazine listed them among the "100 most Influential People of 2021".

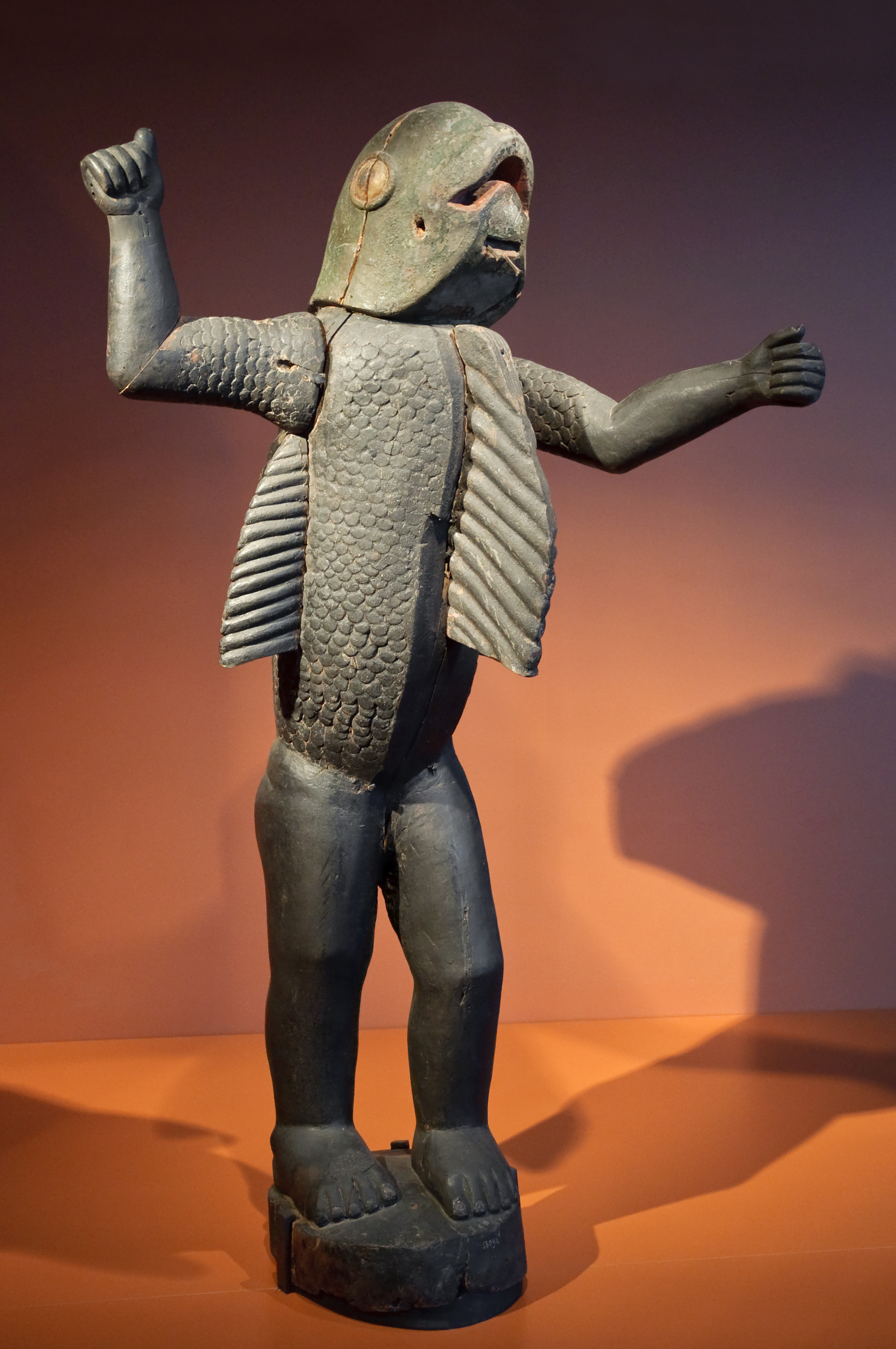
Royal statue from historical kingdom of Dahomey, representing King Béhanzin with features of a shark

== Background ==
The report followed a speech by Emmanuel Macron, president of France, on 28 November 2017 at Ouagadougou, Burkina Faso, in which he addressed the policy of France in sub-Saharan Africa. The French president commissioned two academics to assess the history and composition of state-owned collections in France, as well as claims and reasons and subsequent steps for eventual restitutions. His motivation for a fundamental reorientation of the cultural policy of France with regard to Africa was expressed in the following words: "I am from a generation of French people for whom the crimes of European colonization cannot be disputed and are part of our history."

For the first time, a French president and his government recognized a moral right of restitution of cultural heritage, items of which are, according to French law, considered to be the inalienable property of the French state. Macron's predecessors never supported the return of African artefacts and other cultural objects in France; for example, Jacques Chirac supported collections of African art and is named in the official title of the Musée du quai Branly - Jacques Chirac. (Note: Chirac was one of the effective supporters of the Musée du quai Branly - Jacques Chirac.) Macron's declaration has therefore been regarded as historic, regardless of how much art will eventually be returned to African countries.

The report was presented to the public on 23 November 2018, and since then has triggered numerous reactions in the French and international discussion about its claims for restitution of African art from museums in Europe or America. Despite Macron's announcement of a timely restitution, the legal requirements for such restitutions pose considerable obstacles: in France, all public assets, including the contents of publicly owned collections, such as museums, libraries or other cultural institutions, are regarded as inalienable possessions.

== The authors and their mission ==
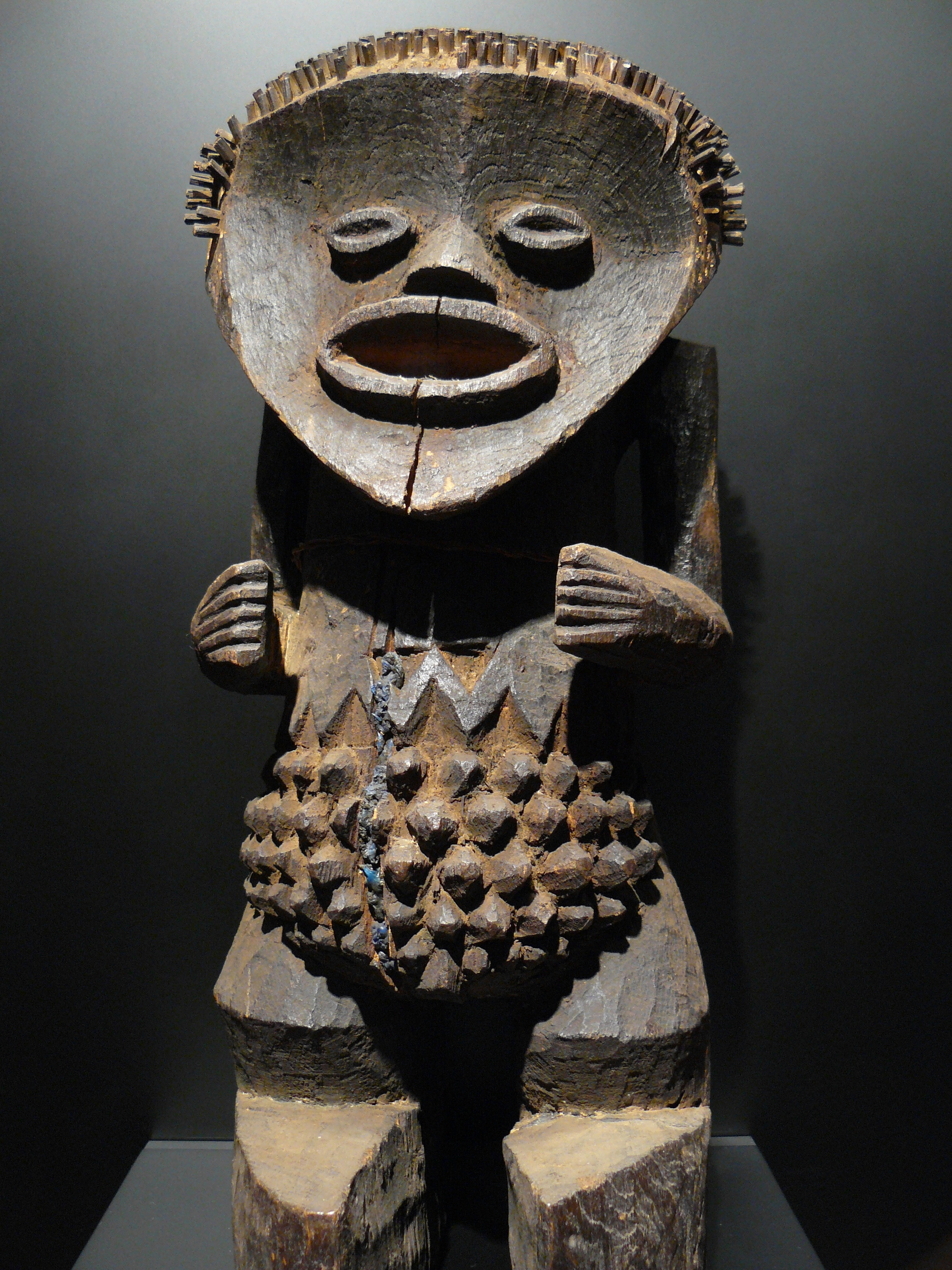
Statue from Nigeria in the Musée du quai Branly, Paris, France

The Senegalese social scientist, musician and economist Felwine Sarr became known for his essay Afrotopia, where he proposes postcolonial theories for a present and future understanding of African countries. He argues that the further development of African democracies should not be brought about by reproducing Western models; instead Africa should reinvent itself through a synthesis of traditional and contemporary forms of social organization. His lectures and academic research focus on postcolonial theory, economic policies, development, economy, econometrics, epistemology and the history of religious ideas. Formerly a professor of economics at the Gaston Berger University (Senegal), he joined Duke University in the United States in 2020.

The French art historian Bénédicte Savoy teaches art history at Technische Universität Berlin in Germany and is also a professor at the Collège de France in Paris. Savoy has published several works on topics such as world art on Western markets, on museums in international contexts or on the illicit acquisition of cultural heritage. Since publication of the report, she has also become known as a proponent for the restitution of African cultural heritage in German collections and actively participates in research and public discussions about this issue.

In his official letter of appointment, Macron instructed the two authors to engage in discussions and workshops with various stakeholders in Africa as well as in France, including research on the colonial history of African cultural heritage. Furthermore, Macron requested concrete proposals and a timetable with proposed actions for the return of cultural objects. Through his explicit statement, "Dialogue and participation must accompany all stages of this work", Macron not only indicated a specific approach, but also opened the door for public debate about his new cultural policy and the resulting report. Since then, this public debate has intensified both in Africa, Europe and the U.S.

== The contents of the report ==
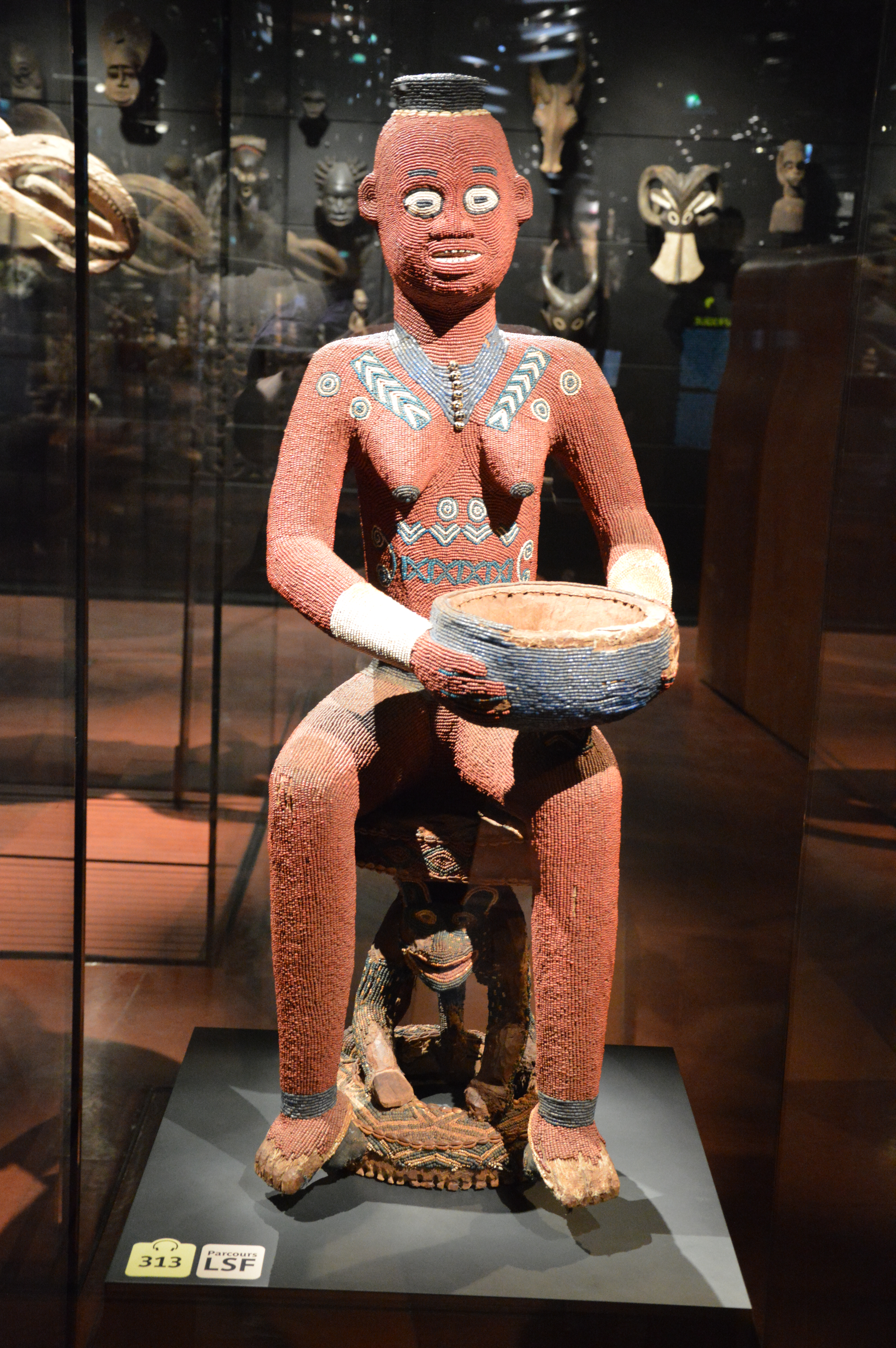
Female statue with bowl, Bamileke, Cameroon, in Musée du Quai Branly

In this report, the authors discuss the reasons and suggest measures for restitutions of African cultural objects from French publicly owned collections to their countries or communities of origin. In accordance with Macron's commission, the scope of the report specifically relates to former French sub-Saharan colonies, and whose cultural heritage has been largely taken to France during and following colonial times. (Note: The report does not cover North African countries, whose cultures have been marked by indigenous populations such as the Berber ethnic groups and by Arab-Islamic influence.)

The introductory chapter, entitled "A Long Duration of Losses" describes the history of African cultural heritage in the context of European colonisation. Central themes are the forceful appropriation of cultural objects as crime against the communities of origin. Also, the importance of collecting, studying and exhibiting African heritage, first as curios and later as ethnological objects, by European museums and scientists is presented as a central aspect of a "history of violence" and domination.

Referring to similar intentions to those expressed in their own report, Sarr and Savoy recall that in 1978, Amadou-Mahtar M’Bow, who was then the director of UNESCO, pleaded in favour of a rebalancing of global cultural heritage between the northern and the southern hemispheres. They quote M'Bow's speech "A plea for the return of an irreplaceable cultural heritage to those who created it":

The peoples who have been victims of this plunder, sometimes for hundreds of years, have not only been despoiled of irreplaceable masterpieces, but also robbed of a memory which would doubtless have helped them to greater self-knowledge and would certainly have helped others understand them better. [...] They know, of course, that art is for the world and are aware of the fact that this artwork, which tells the story of their past and shows what they really are, does not speak to them alone. They are happy that men and women elsewhere can study and admire the work of their ancestors. They also realize that certain works of art have for too long played too intimate a part in the history of the country to which they were taken for the symbols linking them with that country to be denied and for the roots that have taken hold to be severed. [...] These men and women who have been deprived of their cultural heritage therefore ask for the return of at least the art treasures which best represent their culture, which they feel are the most vital and whose absence causes them the greatest anguish. This is a legitimate claim.

— Amadou-Mahtar M'Bow, former Director of UNESCO, Paris, 1978

Furthermore, the report considers the advocacy of public opinion since the beginning of the 2010s to be one of the main motivations for a change of attitudes in Europe. Based on their assessment that approximately 90% of all cultural heritage from sub-Saharan Africa is in the possession of Western collections, the authors understand their report primarily as a call for the timely restitution of artefacts and for the establishment of a new relationship of Europe towards Africa on the basis of mutual recognition.

After this brief, but focused history of African colonial art in Western collections and earlier claims for restitution, the three following chapters entitled "To Restitute", "Restitutions and Collections" and "Accompanying the Returns" discuss the central aspects of the tasks associated with such restitutions. Here, the authors suggest both criteria for restitution as well as a concrete timetable for the French and African authorities to follow. Finally, the appendices of the report describe the methods and steps followed by the authors, supported by corresponding documents, charts and figures on the collections in France as well as information on museums in Africa. Due to its extensive holdings of approximately 70,000 objects from Africa and its detailed archives on the provenance of the objects, the Musée du quai Branly in Paris occupies a special position in the report's list. It ends with photographs and detailed information on thirty outstanding objects in this museum, which are considered as priorities for future restitution.

The report also identifies the following important measures for a comprehensive reorientation of cultural relations: only through respectful international cooperation, with access to research, archives and documentation for people in Africa or in the African diaspora can the wide gaps between Africa and the West relating to the preservation, study and wider appreciation of African culture be narrowed. These measures include joint research and training by the participating museums, the exchange of temporary exhibitions—also among African countries—as well as the material support for appropriate networks or infrastructures for the museums in Africa and the experts working for them. (Note: Following the report, France pledged to finance a loan for a museum for the future restitution of objects from the Royal Court of Abomey in Benin. Stapley-Brown, Victoria (18 July 2019). "Benin gets €20m loan for new museum to show restituted heritage". theartnewspaper.com.) To ensure that knowledge of African cultural heritage reaches younger generations, the authors also recommend effective educational initiatives.

The historical window that opened up in Ouagadougou on November 28, 2017 [...] establishes a new era in cultural relations between France and Africa, and in a larger and more general manner, between Europe and Africa. By recognizing the legitimacy of the requests made by African countries to recover a significant part of their cultural heritage and their memory, while at the same time working toward a better understanding about this moment of colonial history, the process of restitution allows for the possibility of writing a new page of a shared and peaceful history, where each protagonist can provide his or her fair piece of the common story.

— Felwine Sarr and Bénédicte Savoy, The restitution of African cultural heritage. Toward a new relational ethics: Conclusion, p. 87

== The historical and geopolitical context ==
Although the Sarr/Savoy report and the accompanying debates refer to the restitution of cultural heritage from Africa, Macron's announcement on his first visit to Africa as president of France stands in the wider context of the history, present and future of French political relations with Africa. In view of the growing political emancipation of some African countries from France, as well as the influence of China in Africa, French foreign policy is interested to maintain and develop its privileged relationship with West African countries and the wider Francophone world. Finally, the discussions and ethical justification of restitutions are examples of a changing view of European colonialism in Africa. Due to each country's colonial past and the present public assessment of this past, this historical re-evaluation has taken different paths in France, Great Britain, Belgium or Germany.

== Reactions and restitutions following the report ==
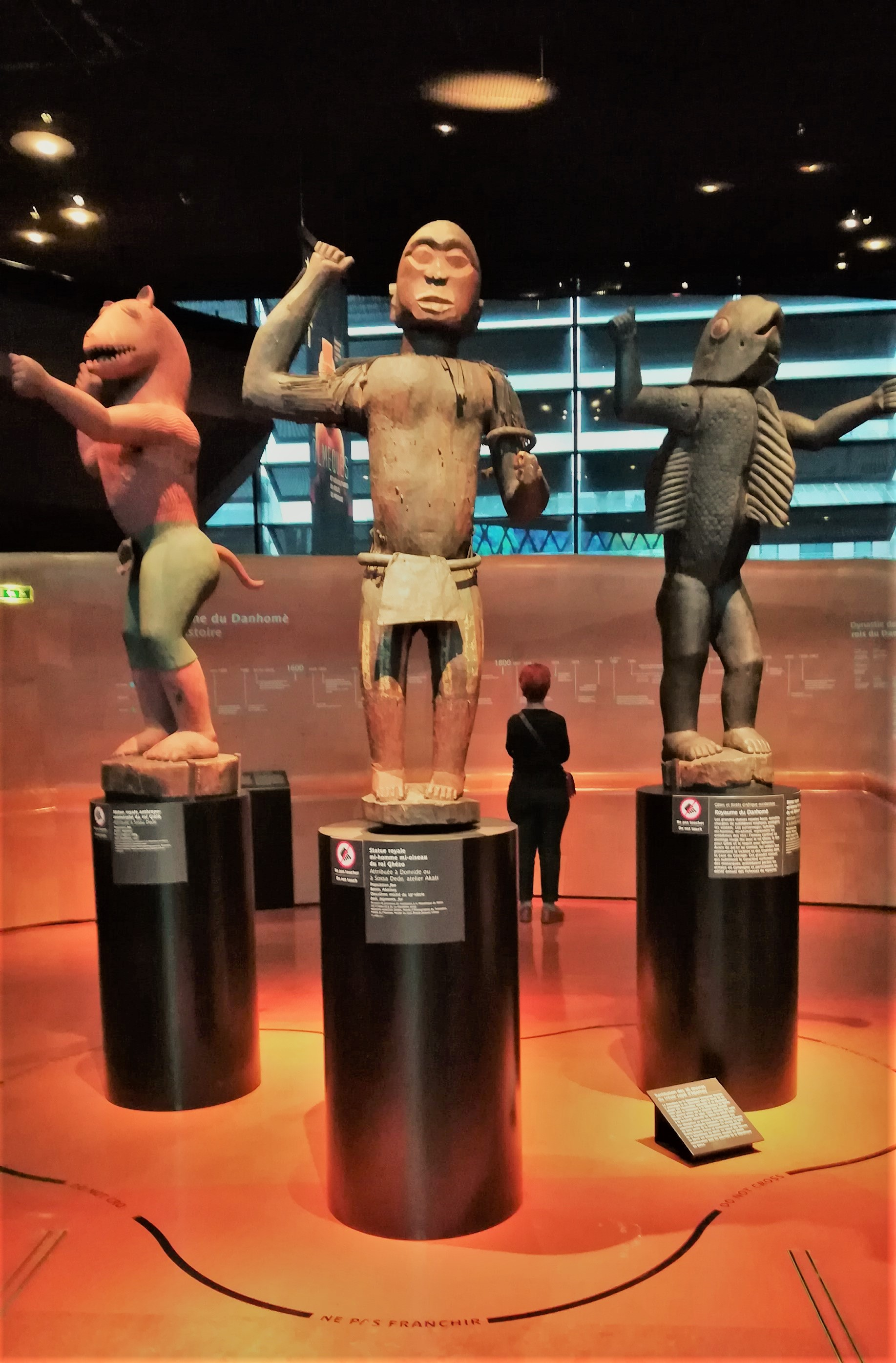
Royal statues of Dahomey in quai Branly museum, before their restitution to Benin at the end of 2021

Since the report was published, its analysis and recommendations have provoked numerous critical, affirmative or negative comments, both in France and other European countries. Museums and government sources in Germany and the Netherlands have issued new guidelines on future restitutions, provenance research and international cooperation. Subsequent restitutions have been made to Namibia from Germany and to Indonesia from the Netherlands. In April 2021, the Ethnological Museum in Berlin and the University of Aberdeen in Scotland announced the return of Benin Bronzes by 2022.

Contrary to some public reactions by art historians and journalists, who evoked the vision of almost empty museums, the report does not recommend a sweeping return of all African cultural heritage from France. (Note: A database of the International Inventories Programme for locating Kenyan cultural objects in 30 institutions worldwide listed more than 32.000 objects in November 2020. This may serve as an indication of the large number of objects, even from a country such as Kenya, which has not been represented in museums on a similar scale as several West African countries. Source: "Explore the Database". International Inventories Programme. Archived from the original on 7 July 2024.) Rather, Sarr and Savoy propose that bilateral diplomatic arrangements be made with African governments for the restitution of significant pieces on the basis of proposals by African experts. As a general recommendation, however, the authors plead for a permanent restitution of illegally acquired cultural objects. They explicitly reject a temporary return of such items as mentioned by Macron and favoured by some museum curators, such as Stéphane Martin, former director of the quai Branly museum. At a conference in June 2019, attended by some 200 academics and representatives of Ministries of Culture from Europe and Africa, the French Minister of Culture pledged that "France will examine all requests presented by African nations", but asked them not to "focus on the sole issue of restitution".

On 24 December 2020, the French government enacted a new law that allows for the permanent restitution of several cultural objects from French collections to Senegal and the Republic of Benin. Already in November 2019, the French prime minister had presented an historic sabre to the Museum of Black Civilisations in Dakar, Senegal, that is said to have belonged to Omar Saïdou Tall, a prominent 19th-century West African spiritual leader who fought French colonialists in the 1850s. (Note: As French historian Francis Simonis pointed out, the sabre of Hadj Omar Tall actually is not an African object, but a European weapon, made for the French Army in the 19th century, and was later taken back to France from Ségou in the modern state of Mali.) This symbolic item, as well as 26 African statues that had been looted by French troops during the sacking of the Royal Palaces of Abomey in 1892 and donated by the French general Alfred Dodds to a predecessor of the Musée du quai Branly in Paris, constitute the first permanent restitutions under the new law. This restitution had already been demanded by the government of Benin in 2016, but was denied by earlier French governments.

In May 2021, new signboards explaining their future restitution were added to a group of three anthropomorphic statues representing historical kings Glélé, Ghézo and Béhanzin of Dahomey. (Note: The signboard next to the group of three statues from the royal palaces in Abomey, presented in May 2021, says in translation from the French original: "The President of the Republic Emmanuel Macron promulgated on December 24, 2020, the text of the law adopted by the National Assembly on December 17, 2020 for the restitution to the Republic of Benin of works taken by Colonel, then General Dodds in Abomey in 1892. This decision follows Benin's official request in July 2016. Notwithstanding the principle of inalienability of French public collections, these works cease to be part of the collection of the Musée du quai Branly-Jacques Chirac and become the property of the Republic of Benin. The return of works to Benin is currently being carried out in full collaboration with the authorities of the Republic of Benin.") Prior to the return of 26 objects to Benin, the museum hosted a week of lectures, discussions and historical documentary films, dedicated to the history of Dahomey. Further, a loan of 20 million Euros from the French Development Agency was allocated towards a new museum and to rehabilitate the four historical royal palaces in Abomey, a UNESCO World Heritage Site since 1985.

On 19 February 2022, an exhibition presenting contemporary Benin art as well as the 26 returned artworks was opened by the president of Benin at the Palais de la Marina in Cotonou. The opening ceremony was attended by artists, traditional chiefs and politicians, and more than 1000 visitors came the next day to see the wooden sculptures, celebrating their homecoming.

On 28 April 2025, French senators voted on a bill to allow the return to Ivory Coast of an object seized in 1916, the Djidji Ayokwe. The bill was unanimously adopted on first reading in the Senate.

=== Digitisation and open access ===
Among other recommendations, the report called for digitisation of all information of collections of African cultural objects and research and for making this information available worldwide by free access over the Internet. In a statement on this suggestion, more than 100 international experts on digitisation and research of cultural objects pointed out their specific reservations. In particular, they cautioned against a unilateral action by Western collections and demanded that African countries must participate in such decisions. Further, African institutions should obtain copyrights for such data, since digital information is considered be of equal importance as the restitution of physical cultural objects.

=== Webpage on holdings of French collections ===
In September 2021, the webpage "Le Monde en musée", was published by the Institut National d’Histoire de l’Art (INHA). It provides access to an annotated map of objects from Africa and Oceania in more than 240 French public collections. It was designed as a publicly accessible research tool and link between museums and research institutions, regardless of their location in the world. For each of the collections, the official name with description of its holdings, as well as information on their provenance is given.

=== 2023 report Shared heritage: universality, restitution and circulation of works of art ===
On 27 April 2023, the French Ministries of Foreign Affairs and of Culture published a report by Jean-Luc Martinez, Ambassador for International Cooperation in the Field of Heritage and Honorary President and CEO of the Louvre, entitled Shared heritage: universality, restitution and circulation of works of art. This report presents a rationale and methods for reviewing and processing restitution requests. As central recommendations, it proposes a future law with nine criteria as the legal basis of future restitutions, the establishment of bilateral commissions composed of experts and researchers from France and the countries of origin, and common restitution policies with Germany, Belgium and the Netherlands. Finally, a special category for "shared heritage" is envisioned for "certain symbolic works that do not meet all the criteria" and therefore should stay in French collections, albeit under a new status of shared ownership. This report was commissioned as a guideline for consultation with parliamentarians with the aim of preparing a framework bill to be submitted to the French parliament. According to an article published by Cambridge University library, however, only a small proportion of artworks in French collections would meet the conditions for restitution.

=== New legislation of 2026 ===
In April 2026, the French houses of parliament moved closer to creating a faster process for returning colonial-era artworks, replacing the previous slow, item-by-item approval system with a broader legal framework. The measure is meant to make restitution easier for countries that have long asked for the return of objects taken during French colonial rule. This legislation applies to artworks taken by France between June 1815 and April 1972, with disputes over objects stolen after 1972 to be handled in civil courts. It still needs final approval through a joint parliamentary process, but it already reflects years of pressure from African governments and a long delay since Emmanuel Macron first promised faster returns. Several requests are pending, including claims from Algeria, Benin, Chad, Ethiopia, Ivory Coast, Madagascar, and Mali. Before this, France repatriated the Djidji Ayokwe drum, also known as the Talking Drum, to the Ivory Coast. The drum had been looted by French colonial troops from the country in 1916. After approval of the restituion by the French parliament, the drum was returned to Abidjan in March 2026.

== Reactions from African countries ==
As commentators from African countries such as Benin, Ethiopia, Mali, Nigeria, or Namibia have, for several decades, made requests for restitution to France, Great Britain, Germany and other countries, the report by Sarr and Savoy has prompted positive comments and generated high expectations: Kwame Opoku, a Ghanaian cultural journalist and former staff member of the United Nations office in Vienna, reported in 2019 that the International Council of African Museums (AFRICOM) has "formally addressed support" for the restitutions as suggested by the Sarr/Savoy report. Some African curators also have reacted critically to one-sided Western initiatives regarding restitutions. Flower Manase, a curator at the National Museum of Tanzania, said that first of all, African experts have to be involved as equal partners, share their own narratives and involve the communities of origin.

Other African cultural commentators, like Tanzanian journalist Charles Kayuka, have pointed to the ethnocentric Western nature of museum exhibitions, which explains why they tend not to find much interest with local visitors in Africa. Another argument of his questions the importance of traditional cultural heritage for modern, globalized African societies:

It's time to repair our stolen identity. (...) But the masks and fetishes that are now stored in European museums—there would be no point in giving them back, because these pieces have no value for the Africans. They are empty, dead, de-souled—they have lost their original meaning because they are torn from their context and thus have become meaningless objects. Because they were not art objects, but religious, ritual, and magic objects. That's why they were so important to African societies back then.

— Charles Kayuka, Tanzania

In their report, Sarr and Savoy have, however, taken account of such differences by calling for international cooperation and community involvement. With regard to the consequences for national cultural policy in African states, Felwine Sarr said in an interview with a German newspaper:

"We want to advise the African participants (on restitution efforts) to steer the discussion in their countries. There is already a place at the Museum for Black Civilizations in Dakar. The infrastructures vary across countries, but the museums as institutions are similar."

== See also ==
- African art in Western collections
- Deaccessioning
- Decolonization of museums
- International Inventories Programme (project for cultural heritage from Kenya in Western collections)

== Works cited and further reading ==
- Sarr, Felwine; Bénédicte Savoy (21 November 2018). "Rapport sur la restitution du patrimoine culturel africain. Vers une nouvelle éthique relationnelle" [The restitution of African cultural heritage. Toward a new relational ethics] (Report) (in French and English). Translated by Drew S. Burk. Paris. pp. 254 inclusive of annexes. Archived from the original (pdf) on 15 August 2021.
- Savoy, Bénédicte (2025). Objects of Desire, Desire for Objects. Translated by Liz Libbrecht. Paris: Collège de France, 2025. https://doi.org/10.4000/13ehc
- Mark, Peter (1999). "Is There Such a Thing as African Art?". Record of the Art Museum, Princeton University. 58 (1/2). Princeton University Art Museum: 7–15. doi:10.2307/3774788. ISSN 0032-843X. JSTOR 3774788.
- Price, Sally; Dan Hicks (6 January 2020). "Has the Sarr-Savoy report had any effect since it was first published?". Apollo.
- Nayeri, Farah (23 November 2019). "France vowed to return looted treasures. But few are heading back". The New York Times.
- Silverman, Raymond; Abungu, George; Probst, Peter (2021). National museums in Africa. Identity, history and politics. Milton: Routledge. p. 284. ISBN 978-1-000-42864-3. OCLC 1259323561.
