= Coumba Dieng Sow =

Agroeconomist and public policy specialist

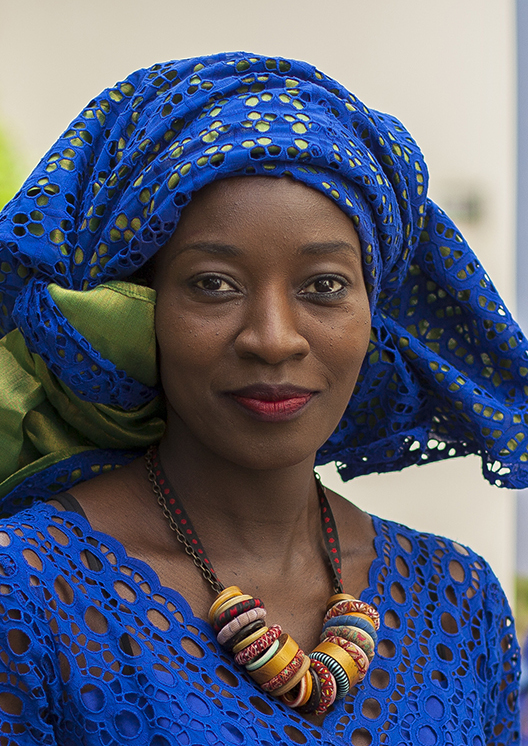
Couma Dieng Sow, en 2019.

Coumba D. Sow is a Senegalese agroeconomist and public policy specialist .

She is since October 2024, the United Nations Resident Coordinator and the Representative of the Secretary General in Togo.

Previously she was the United Nations Food and Agriculture Organization Country Representative in Rwanda and a.i in Djibouti until 2024.

She has been listed in 2022, 2023 and 2024 among the 100 most influential women in Africa because of her unique engagement for agriculture and support to women and youth in this sector.

== Education ==
Sow trained at Sciences Po Paris, the University of London and in agrifood at School of Agricultural Cooperation and Food Industry Management ESCAIA in Montpellier.

== Career ==
Sow joined the United Nations in 2006 as FAO Agricultural Policy Officer working in Africa, Asia, and Latin America. She worked amongst others in the implementation of the Comprehensive Africa Agriculture Development Programme (CAADP) of the NEPAD.

She then became in 2013 Responsible for Africa at the Office of the Director-General of FAO.

From 2017, she was in charge of emergency humanitarian and resilience actions, for the FAO, in the West Africa and Sahel subregion.

United Nations Secretary-General António Guterres has appointed Coumba D. Sow of Senegal as the United Nations Resident Coordinator in Togo, with the host Government’s approval, starting on 5 October.

== Engagement ==
Coumba D. Sow is a strong advocate for African youth and women empowerment in the agriculture sector, raising awareness of the existed realities of you and women farmers in Africa and supporting the removal of barriers for them to access land, inputs, finances, training, technologies, and innovations which would help reducing hunger, and increasing revenues and economic growth.

Coumba D. Sow works to improve the livelihoods of vulnerable populations in Africa, whose food and nutritional security is regularly threatened. She defends the use of endogenous knowledge of the populations themselves, including agroecology and country investments to reduce vulnerabilities and create the conditions for the development of agriculture.

In 2018, it launched the FAO initiative: 1 million cisterns for the Sahel. The initiative aims to facilitate access to water for rural communities exposed to climate change. It is inspired by the Brazilian experience from the Fome Zero program.

She participates, invited by Achille Mbembe and Felwine Sarr in the "Ateliers de la pensée", an event bringing together researchers, artists and civil society actors to reflect on the challenges of the African continent and the world10. Coumba D. Sow dealt with Climate resilience and ancestral knowledge in the Sahel alongside Kako Nubukpo, Alioune Sall Paloma, Emmanuel Ndoye.

== Books ==
She is co-author in 2019 with José Graziano da Silva, former Director-General of FAO, of the book From Fome Zero to Zero Hunger: A global perspective

She recently co-authored with Sophie Kabano of Rwanda Arts Initiative Uruhimbi: Rwanda Gastronomy and Culinary Art, a gastronomy book that showcases the rich culinary heritage of Rwanda and the hidden potential of local but often underutilised ingredients. It is a collaboration with four Rwandan chefs, Angelique Iraguha, Eric Kanyemera, Phiona Ninsiima and Ramadhan Sindayigaya, who have infused traditional dishes with modern culinary techniques promoting sustainable and resilient food systems.
