= Tchaman =

Akan people in Ivory Coast

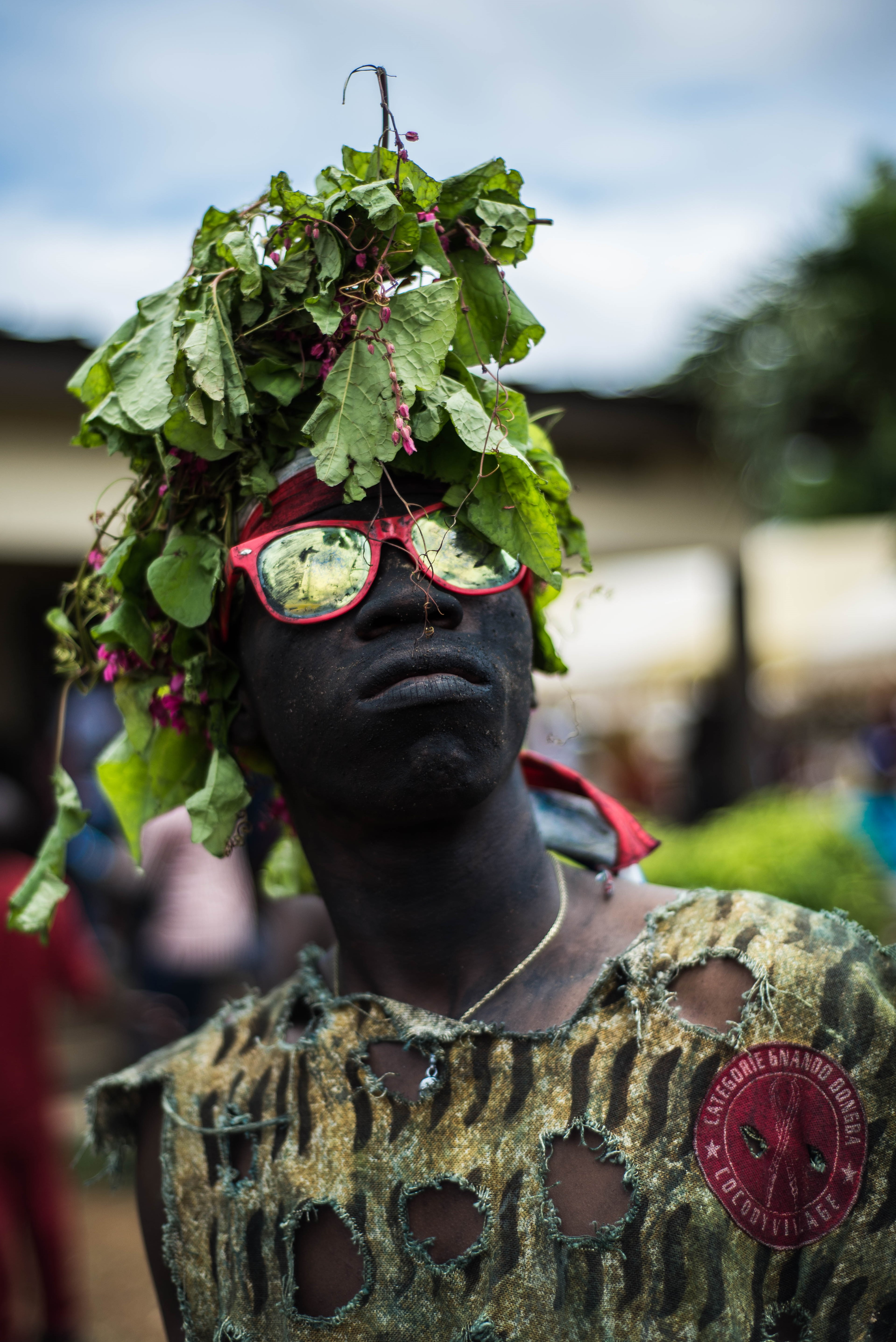
Blessoué generation

The Tchaman or Ébrié are an Akan people living in the Abidjan region of Côte d'Ivoire. Originally called the "Tchaman/Kyama/Gyama" or "Achan" (both of which mean "the chosen ones" in the Ebrié language), the name Ébrié was given to them by the neighboring Abouré people. In the Abouré language, Ébrié means "bad" and was given to them after a military defeat. In turn, however, they refer to the Abouré as "Koroman," which means "dirty people" in the Tchaman, Kyaman, or Gyaman (Achan) language. The traditional lands of the Tchaman/Kyaman/Gyaman lie along the Ébrié Lagoon, which extends from Grand-Bassam (in the east) to Assagni (in the west) and includes the city of Abidjan and its environs. The Tchaman (also Kyaman, Gyaman) make up approximately 0.7% of the population of Côte d'Ivoire.

== History of the Tchaman people ==
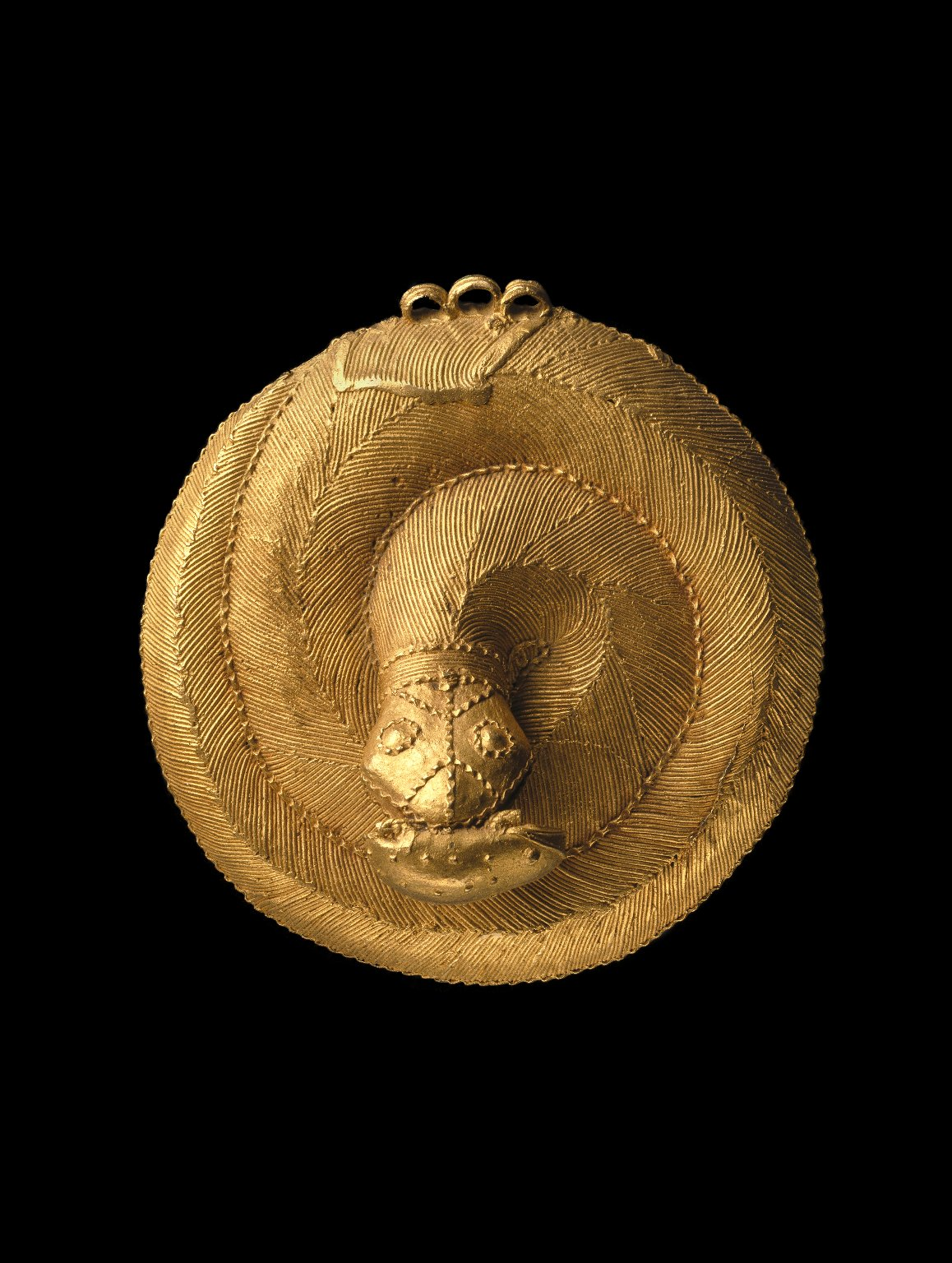
Tchaman Serpent Pendant

The Tchaman are members of the Akan ethnolinguistic group. Their oral history relates that the tribe was originally located to the northeast, near the lands of the Ashanti in Ghana, but that they fled to the south after a great defeat in battle by a neighboring tribe. They are believed to have begun immigrating to their present location in the eighteenth century, and the migration took place in several stages, or waves. In Côte d'Ivoire, the Tchaman are traditionally divided into nine distinct kinship groups, or phratries (goto in the Tchaman/Kyaman/Gyaman language): Kwè, Bidjan, Yopougon, Nonkwa, Songon, Bodo, Dyapo, Bya and Gnangon. All told, these nine phratries form a community that spans the sixty-three villages in the region.

== Village organization ==
Tchaman villages are, by and large, oriented around a single large thoroughfare. Due to the predominant Christian faith of the Tchaman, most villages have three houses of worship: a Catholic church, a Protestant church and a Harrist church. Each village, or akubè, is divided into quarters, or akrobu, whose names reflect the slope of the land on which they are built. Quarters built on high ground are called Ato, while those built on lower ground are known as até. School buildings are generally built in a quarter separate from the main residential area, as are cemeteries, which are traditionally built in a high-ground ato quarter, at a slight remove from the rest of the village.

== Economy ==
Because of their proximity to both the lagoon and the neighboring ocean, the principle economic activity of the Tchaman/Kyaman people is fishing. Those communities located in more outlying areas of Tchaman/Kyaman land, such as Bingerville and Songon, are also engaged in the cultivation of produce agriculture, such as plantains, yams, taro and manioc, as well as export products like coffee, cacao, rubber, palm oil, bananas and sweet potatoes.

== Traditional and political organization ==
One of the central features of the organization of Tchaman/Kyama (Achan) society is the generations of its inhabitants. For the most part, generation groups are formed by people born within a 15-year span of one another. These co-generationals are considered, for all intents and purposes, siblings, even if they are not biologically related. This system takes into account both genders, and recognizes four generations, which are known by the following names: Blessoué, Gnando, Dougbo and Tchagba. Each generation, in turn, is separated into four smaller sub-groups (in order of seniority): Djehou, Dongba, Agban and Assoukrou. The entire cycle of four generations lasts sixty years. This organizations exists within a system of clans, in which lineage is traced maternally. Despite this, a child is considered to be its father's, and it is the father who is responsible for naming the child. A child is incorporated into its maternal family as it grows.

== See also ==
- Djidji Ayokwe
