= Fabrizio Moretti (art dealer) =

Italian art dealer

- Born: 6 December 1976 (age 49); Prato, Italy
- Education: University of Florence
- Occupation: Art dealer
- Known for: Galleries in Florence, London and Monaco
- Website: https://morettigallery.com/

Fabrizio Moretti (born 6 December 1976) is an Italian art dealer, specialising in Italian Old Masters.

== Life and career ==
Fabrizio Moretti was born in Prato, Italy, on 6 December 1976, the son of fellow art dealer Alfredo Moretti. He has a degree in humanities from the University of Florence.

In 1999, he founded Galleria Moretti in central Florence, Italy, focusing on Old Masters. In 2005, he opened Moretti Fine Art in London's New Bond Street, relocating to St James's in 2011. In 2017, he opened a gallery in Monaco, in a former Credit Suisse office at the Park Palace, overlooking the Place du Casino.

Moretti has been called the "wunderkind of the younger generation of dealers."
