= Principle of inalienability of the public domain =

The principle of inalienability of the public domain is a legal principle which prohibits the deaccessioning of cultural goods held in public institutions. This article's use of "public domain" refers to property owned by the public, rather than the term "public domain" used in intellectual property law that refers to works and materials for which rights recognized copyright or patent have either expired or never existed.

== France ==
In France, the principle of inalienability has its roots in the Ancien Régime.

Although the principle was abolished by the revolutionaries in 1789, it was re-introduced by the Court of Appeal in 1846, and subsequently by the Court of Cassation and the Conseil d'Etat. The principle of inalienability is now embodied in article L52 of the Code du Domaine de l’Etat and article L3111-1 of the Code Général de la Propriété des Personnes Publiques.

=== Deaccessioning procedure ===
Under article L. 451-5 of the French Code du Patrimoine, the deaccessioning of state property will only be permitted after consent of the Commission Nationale Scientifique des Collections. This procedure is, however, not available for goods that have been entered public collections through gifts and bequests.

=== Derogations to the principle of inalienability ===
To permit the restitution of cultural goods and human remains without using the deaccessioning procedure, France has, on three occasions, enacted special laws. Thus, in April 2002, the French Parliament voted the restitution of Saartjie Baartman's remains held in the Musée de l'Homme in Paris to South Africa. In 2012, the French Parliament authorized the restitution of the Maori Heads held in the Musée de Rouen to New Zealand. In December 2020, France permitted the restitution of twenty-seven artifacts held in the Musée du Quai Branly—Jacques Chirac to Senegal and Benin.

== See also ==
- Aliénation juridique
