= Rautenstrauch-Joest Museum =

- Rautenstrauch-Joest-Museum
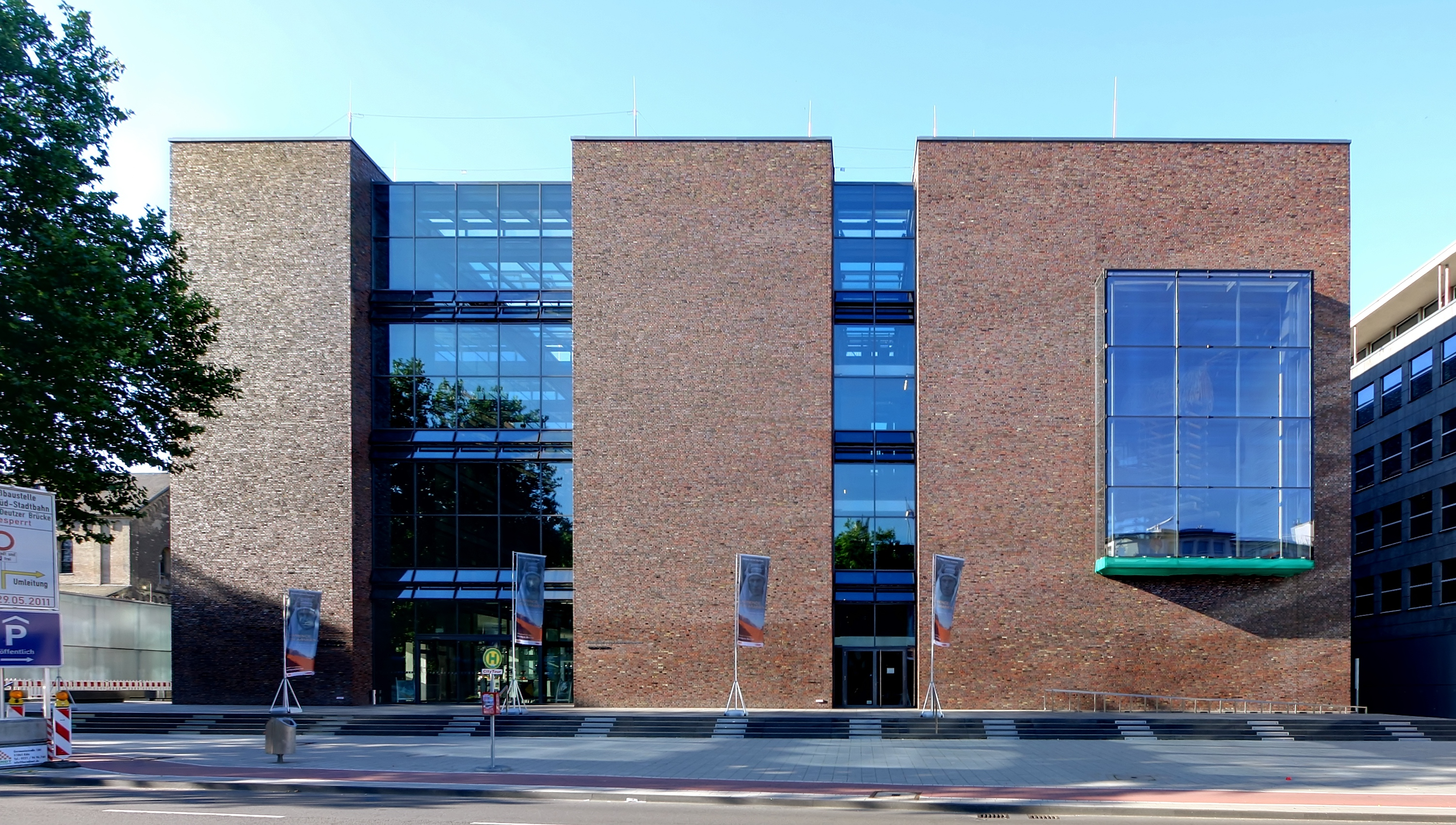
- Location: Cologne, Germany
- Coordinates: 50.934639°N 6.950531°E
- Type: Ethnographic museum
- Website: museenkoeln.de/rautenstrauch-joest-museum

The Rautenstrauch-Joest Museum is a museum of ethnography in Cologne, Germany. It was reopened in 2010. The museum arose from a collection of over 3500 items belonging to ethnographer Wilhelm Joest. After his death in 1897, the collection was left to his sister Adele Rautenstrauch.

In 2018, the Rautenstrauch-Joest Museum returned a tattooed Māori skull, which had been in its collection for 110 years, to a delegation representing the Museum of New Zealand Te Papa Tongarewa in Wellington; the skull was purchased in 1908 by the first director of the Rautenstrauch Joest Museum, Willy Foy, from a London dealer.

In 2021 the museum held RESIST! The Art of Resistance, an experimental decolonial exhibition featuring activists and artists from the Global South diaspora.
