= Wilhelm Joest =

German ethnographer (1852–1897)

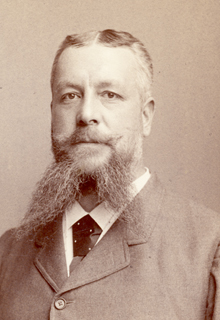
Wilhelm Joest

Wilhelm Joest (15 March 1852, Köln – 25 November 1897) was a German ethnographer and world traveler.

He studied sciences and languages at the universities of Bonn, Heidelberg and Berlin, and afterwards took a study trip to North Africa. From 1876 to 1879 he traveled throughout North and South America, conducting scientific investigations from Canada southward to Patagonia, during which, he collected numerous ethnographic, anthropological and zoological items.

From 1879 to 1881 he journeyed widely in southern and eastern Asia — from Ceylon he traveled through India to the Himalayas, then accompanied the British army in the midst of the Second Anglo-Afghan War. He studied the customs and languages of the inhabitants of the Malay Archipelago (mainly Borneo, Ceram and Sulawesi) as well as those of the natives of Formosa. He spent considerable time with the Ainu of Japan, and in 1881 traveled from Vladivostok through Manchuria, Mongolia and Siberia on his way back to Germany.

In 1883 he traveled extensively in South Africa, followed by a journey northward along the eastern coast of Africa. In 1889 he returned to South America, where he conducted scientific studies in Venezuela and the Guianas, largely in the region between the Orinoco and Maroni Rivers. He succumbed to illness and died in 1897 after departing the Santa Cruz Islands (part of the Solomon Islands) during a Pacific expedition, and is buried on Ureparapara of the Banks Islands (part of Vanuatu). After his death, his collections were left to his sister, Adele Rautenstrauch. The Rautenstrauch-Joest Museum in Köln traces its origins to his private collection of over 3500 objects.

== Selected works ==
- Aus Japan nach Deutschland durch Sibirien, 1882 – From Japan to Germany via Siberia.
- Das Holontalo : Glossar und grammatische Skizze; ein Beitrag zur Kenntniss der Sprachen von Celebes, 1883 – The Holontalo language: Glossary and grammatical sketch; a contribution to the knowledge of the languages of Sulawesi.
- Um Afrika, 1885 – To Africa.
- Tätowiren, Narbenzeichnen und Körperbemalen; ein Beitrag zur vergleichenden Ethnologie, 1887 – Tattooing, scarring and body painting; a contribution to comparative ethnology.
- Die außereuropäische deutsche Presse nebst einem Verzeichnis sämtlicher außerhalb Europas erscheinenden deutschen Zeitungen und Zeitschriften, 1888.
- Ethnographisches und verwandtes aus Guayana, 1893 – Ethnography and related subjects involving the Guianas.
- Welt-Fahrten; Beiträge zur Länder- und Völkerkunde, 1895 – World travels; Contributions to geography and ethnology.
