= Djidji Ayokwe =

Ivorian drum

Djidji Ayokwe or Djidji Ayôkwé is a sacred talking drum belonging to the Ébrié people in Abidjan, Côte d'Ivoire. The drum, carved from a single piece of iroko, is 3.5 m (11 ft) in length and weighs around 430 kg (950 lb).

Djidji Ayokwe was primarily used for communication between villages, and could be heard 20 km (12 mi) away. It was sounded to warn of danger, bring people to ceremonies, and mobilise the population for war, and was famously used to raise the alarm about advancing French colonists. In 1916 the drum was seized by the colonial government, and sent to France in 1929 where it was displayed in the Trocadéro Museum and later the Quai Branly Museum. In March 2026, Djidji Ayokwe was returned to the Côte d'Ivoire following years of campaigning, as part of broader repatriation efforts by the French government. It was the first item to be returned to the Côte d'Ivoire out of 148 kept in France. The drum is expected to be displayed in the Museum of Civilizations in Abidjan.
