= La Tribune de l'art =

French online magazine

La Tribune de l'art (The Art Tribune) is a French online magazine on art history and western heritage from the Middle Ages to the 1930s. It was set up on 7 April 2003 by Didier Rykner, art historian and former agronomist. In 2008, the magazine's editor-in-chief received the La Demeure historique prize in the "journalist's prize, written press — internet" category. In 2021, the magazine will have 4,000 subscribers, a turnover of 320,000 euros and four employees.
