= Felwine Sarr =

Senegalese academic, writer and musician

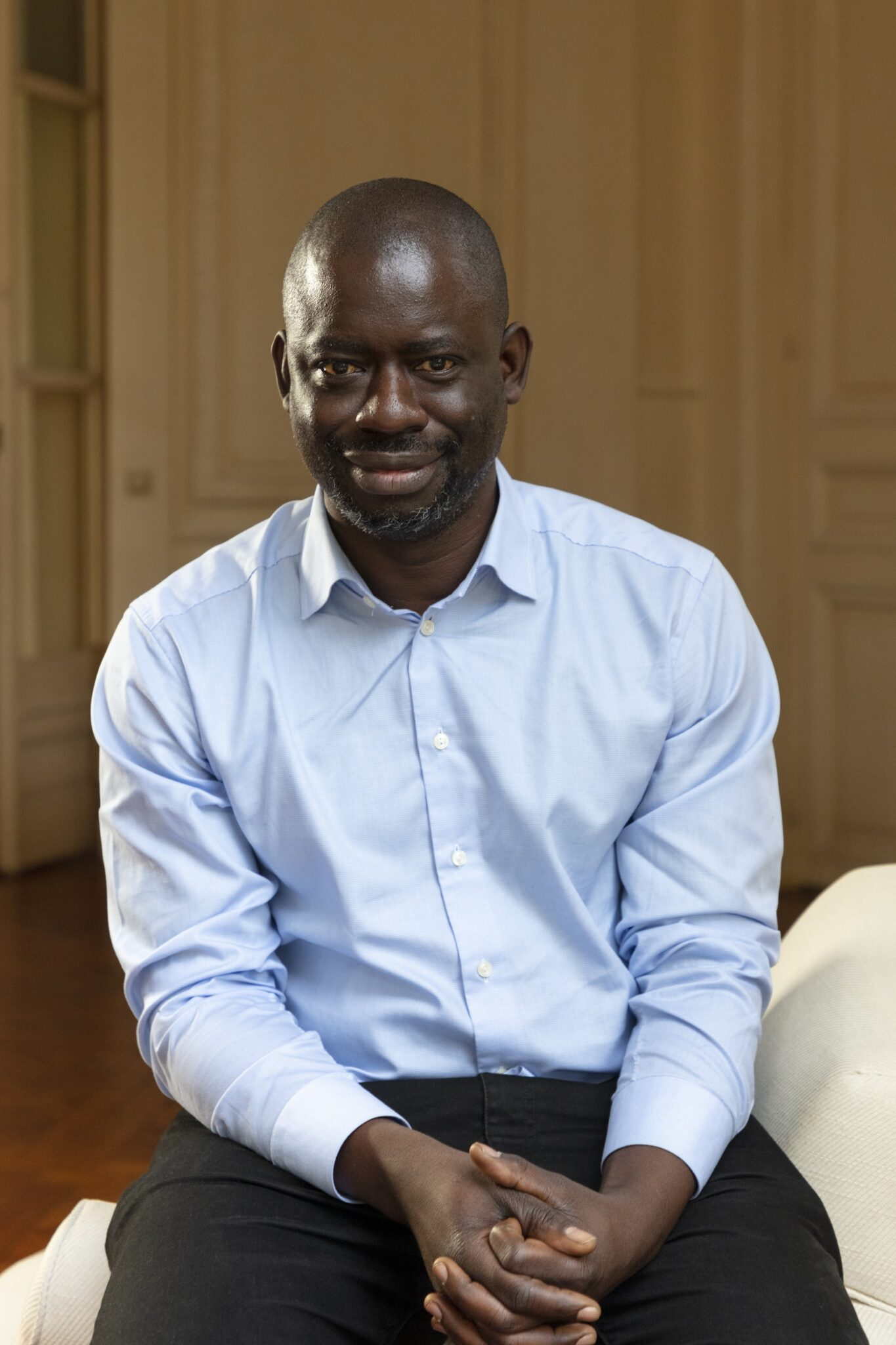
Felwine Sarr in 2021

Felwine Sarr (born 11 September 1972) is a Senegalese academic, musician and writer of novels and cultural essays, born in Sine Saloum, Niodior Arrondissement. He studied economics and taught this subject at the Gaston Berger University (Senegal) until his move in 2020 as Anne-Marie Bryan Distinguished Professor in the Department of Romance Studies at Duke University in the United States.

== Biography ==
Born on 11 September 1972, Felwine Sarr conducted his primary and secondary education in Senegal, and then went to France where he obtained an agrégation in economics. In 2011, he became dean of the economics and management faculty of the University Gaston Berger of Saint-Louis, Senegal, and head of the new faculty of Civilizations, Religions, Arts and Communication (CRAC) of the same university, for which he also was in charge of the implementation.

His lectures and academic research focus on postcolonial theory, economic policies, development, economy, econometrics, epistemology and the history of religious ideas. Further, he has been vice-chairman of the Board of Directors of OSIWA (Open Society Initiative for West Africa) since 2014 and is also the editor of the Journal of African Transformation.

He is from a family of musicians, including Saliou Waa Guendoum Sarr and Sahad Sarr.

== Publications and musical career ==
Apart from being an academic, Sarr is also a writer and was awarded the Grand Prix of Literary Associations in 2016 (Research Category) for his essay entitled Afrotopia (Philippe Rey, 2016). In this essay, he argues for a conceptual decolonization of knowledge and a reappropriation of the metaphors of their own future by Africans. In a presentation of the English translation of this work, Duke University's Trinity College of Arts and Sciences commented as follows: "Sarr elaborates Africa's unique philosophies and notions of communal value and economy deeply rooted in its ancient traditions and landscape". Further, Sarr has published the novels Dahij (2009), 105 Rue Carnot (2011), and Médiations Africaines (2012).

As a musician, he has published three musical compositions: Civilisation ou Barbarie (2000), Les Mots du Récit (2005), and Bassai (2007). With the writers Boubacar Boris Diop and Nafissatou Dia, he cofounded the publishing house Jimsaan. Since 2014, he has been vice-president of the board of directors at OSIWA (Open Society Initiative for West Africa). Felwine Sarr is also editor of the Journal of African Transformation (CODESRIA-UNECA). In October 2016, Sarr and Cameroonian philosopher Achille Mbembe founded Ateliers de la Pensée (Workshops of Thought), which have brought together intellectuals and artists from Africa and its diaspora in Dakar and Saint-Louis to discuss contemporary problems from an African perspective.

In 2018, Sarr and French art historian Bénédicte Savoy were asked by the president of France, Emmanuel Macron, to investigate the state of African cultural heritage in French state-owned museums. Their Report on the restitution of African cultural heritage (in French: Rapport sur la restitution du patrimoine culturel africain) was presented to Macron in November 2018 and published online in an official French version and an English translation.

== Awards and recognitions ==
- 2010, Abdoulaye Fadiga prize for research in economics.
- 2016, Grand Prix of Literary Associations (Research Category).
- 2018, Nicolás Guillén Outstanding Achievement for Philosophical Literature Award of the Caribbean Philosophical Association
- 2020, Third place in the annual ranking of the "Most influential People in the international Art World", established by ArtReview magazine.
- 2021, Time magazine listed him and Bénédicte Savoy among the 100 Most Influential People.

== Bibliography ==
=== Novels ===
- Lieux qu'habitent mes rêves. Paris: Gallimard. 2022.
- La Saveur des derniers mètres. Paris: Philippe Rey. 2021.
- Traces. Arles: Actes Sud. 2022.
- Dahij. Paris: Gallimard. 2009. ISBN 9782070122677. OCLC 470774663.
- 105 Rue Carnot. Montreal: Mémoire d'Encrier. 2011. ISBN 9782923713571. OCLC 816317015.
- Méditations Africaines. Montreal: Mémoire d'Encrier. 2012. ISBN 9782923713731. OCLC 833590511.

=== Nonfiction ===
- Afrotopia (awarded the Grand Prix of Literary Associations 2016—Research Category)
- Habiter le monde Memoire d'encrier 2018—Research Category)
- Report on the restitution of African cultural heritage (Sarr, Felwine; Savoy, Bénédicte (21 November 2018). Rapport sur la restitution du patrimoine culturel africain. Vers une nouvelle éthique relationnelle [The restitution of African cultural heritage. Toward a new relational ethics] (Report) (in French and English). Translated by Burk, Drew S. Paris. pp. 252, including annexes. ISBN 978-2848767253. Archived from the original (pdf) on 15 August 2021.)

== Discography ==
- 2000: Civilisation ou barbarie
- 2005: Les mots du récit
- 2007: Bassaï
