= Bénédicte Savoy =

French art historian

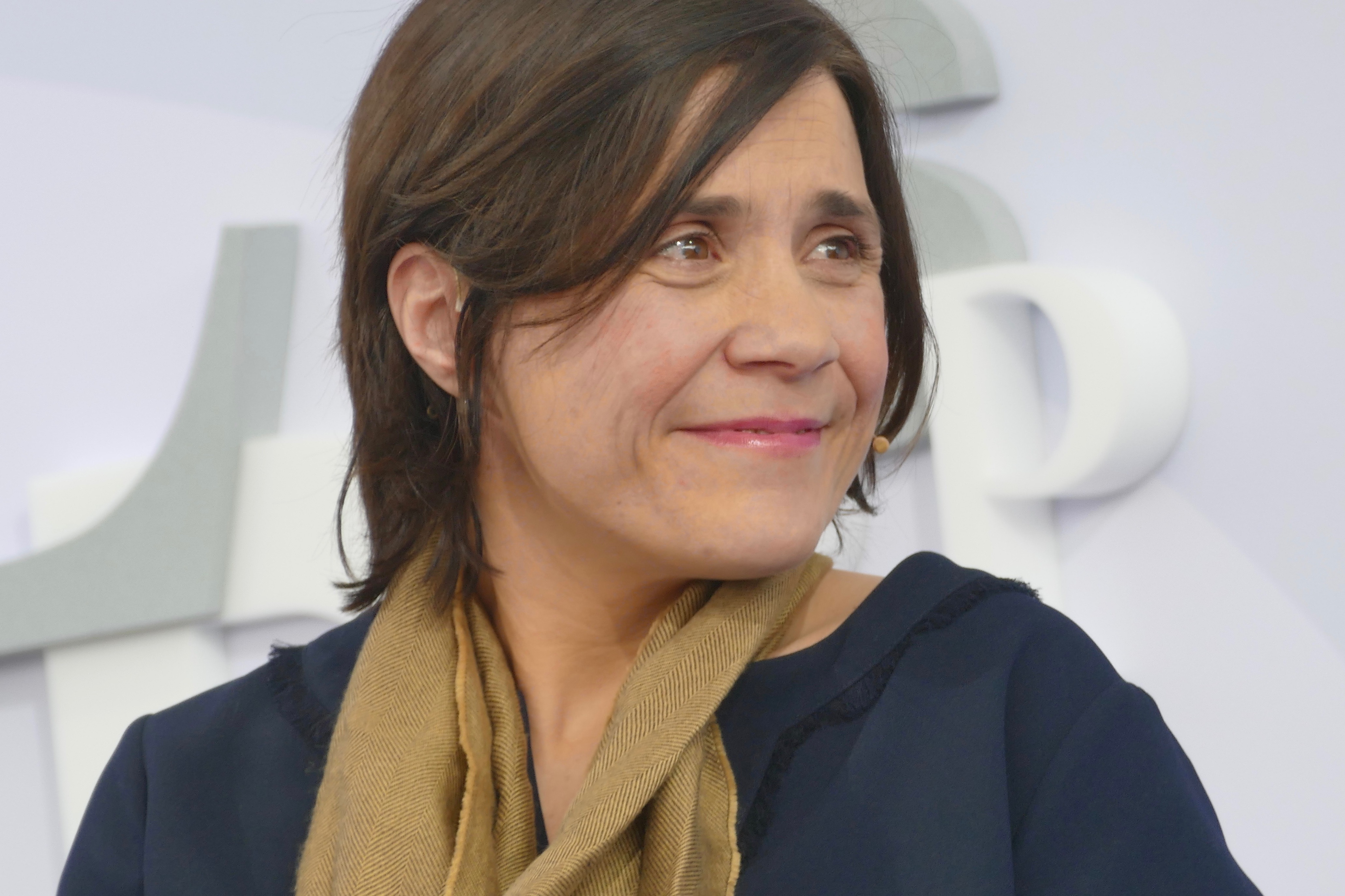
- Bénédicte Savoy in 2018
- Born: 22 May 1972 (age 54); Paris, France
- Education: University of Paris VIII; École normale supérieure
- Known for: Provenance
- Awards: Leibniz Prize
- Scientific career
- Fields: Art history
- Workplaces: Collège de France; Technische Universität Berlin

Bénédicte Savoy (French: Bénédicte Savoy [benedikt savwa]; born 22 May 1972) is a French art historian, specialising in the critical enquiry of the provenance of works of art, including looted art and other forms of illegally acquired cultural objects.

Savoy is professor of modern art history at Technische Universität Berlin, Germany. From 2016 to 2021, she was professor for cultural history of European Artistic Heritage from the 18th to 20th centuries at the Collège de France in Paris. Commissioned by the French president in 2018, she and economist and writer Felwine Sarr from Senegal are the authors of a report on the restitution of African cultural heritage.

== Biography and career ==
As a high school student, Savoy attended the Beethoven-Gymnasium in West Berlin in 1988/89. She then studied German language and civilisation at the École Normale Supérieure in Fontenay, France, which she completed in 1994 with a master's thesis on the visual artist Anselm Kiefer. In 1996, she received the agrégation (license to teach in French high schools).

From 1998 to 2001, she was research assistant at the Centre Marc Bloch in Berlin and lecturer both at TU Berlin and at FU Berlin in Berlin. In 2000, she received her doctorate from the University of Paris VIII with a dissertation on French art theft in Germany. From 2003 to 2009, Savoy was a junior professor at the Institute for History and Art History at Technische Universität Berlin. Since 2009, she has been professor of modern art history at the same university.

Savoy is a member of the Board of Trustees of the German Federal Cultural Foundation. After a series of lectures as a guest lecturer in June 2015, Savoy was appointed professor at the Collège de France in 2016. She held the chair of Histoire culturelle du patrimoine artistique en Europe, XVIII^{e}-XX^{e} siècles until 2021. In 2024, Savoy held the "Cátedra del Prado" academic guest professorship at the Prado Museum in Madrid. In 2025, the Louvre announced Savoy would take up the role as "Chaire du Louvre" starting in 2026.

=== Expert on the ethics of cultural collections ===
Savoy is internationally known as an expert on the ethics of ownership of cultural collections and research on the provenance of cultural heritage in the context of "translocations" of artworks. Since her 2003 study of the cultural heritage looted in Germany by French troops during the Napoleonic Wars (French title: Patrimoine annexé. Les biens culturels saisis par la France en Allemagne autour de 1800), she has published several books, academic papers and articles on the illicit transfer of cultural goods.

Commissioned by French president Emmanuel Macron in 2018, Savoy and Senegalese academic Felwine Sarr investigated the possibility of returning cultural items from French state-owned museums to African countries. This resulted in their report on the restitution of African cultural heritage in November 2018, which presents a detailed analysis of the African cultural heritage in France as well as recommendations and an outline for possible restitutions.

In her book Africa's Struggle for Its Art: History of a Post-Colonial Defeat, first published in German in 2021, Savoy documented the numerous endeavours by African nations to recover cultural objects acquired under colonial circumstances during the 1970s and the 1980s. Following her and Felwine Sarr's 2018 report on the restitution of African cultural heritage, she shows "how extensively these stories have been silenced and suppressed by European cultural leaders." In Acquiring Cultures: Histories of World Art on Western Markets, Savoy and her co-authors published various studies on the "history of seizure, trade and collecting of non-Western heritage from Asia, the Pacific, the Indian subcontinent, Africa, Australia and the Americas, and the foundation of public or private collections in Europe and the United States" since the mid-18th-century.

As member of the academic community of art historians in Berlin, she has been involved in the debates on the restitution of African cultural heritage in German collections and actively participates in research and public discussions about this issue. Until 2017, she was member of the advisory board of the Humboldt Forum in Berlin, but resigned from this committee, because of her negative assessment of the future museum's handling of art objects that originate from Germany's former colonial territories.

In 2020, Savoy and other art historians at Technische Universität Berlin and the University of Oxford's Pitt Rivers Museum were appointed to carry out a joint research project called Restitution of Knowledge to study, how art and cultural assets from other countries were collected in major museums of Europe.

Since 2019, Savoy has also been a member of the newly established board of the Junge Akademie, an interdisciplinary research organisation, which is jointly supported by the two oldest academies for sciences in Germany, the German National Academy of Sciences Leopoldina and the Berlin-Brandenburg Academy of Sciences and Humanities. She became member of the latter in 2016.

In May 2023, Savoy presented a study, titled Atlas der Abwesenheit, which found that German museums hold 40,000 artifacts from Cameroon —more than any other museum collection worldwide.

== Awards and recognition ==
- 2009: Walter-de-Gruyter-Prize, Berlin-Brandenburg Academy of Sciences and Humanities
- 2011: Richard Hamann Prize for Art History awarded by Philipps Universität Marburg, Germany
- 2013: Knight of the National Order of Merit, France
- 2014: Prize for excellent teaching awarded by the Society of Friends of the Technische Universität Berlin
- 2015: Prix du Rayonnement de la langue et de la littérature françaises awarded by the Académie Française
- 2015: Prix de l'Académie de Berlin
- 2016: Gottfried Wilhelm Leibniz Prize awarded by the German Research Foundation
- 2017: Kythera-Prize awarded by the Kythera-Kulturstiftung
- 2021: Carl Friedrich Gauß-Medaille of the Braunschweig scientist society
- 2022: Glas der Vernunft, Kasseler Bürgerpreis
- 2022: Franco-German Media Prize awarded by the Franco-German Journalism Prize
- 2022: Knight of the Legion of Honour, France
- 2022: Prize of the German Cultural Council
- 2023: Berliner Wissenschaftspreis
- 2024: Clark Prize for Excellence in Arts Writing by the Clark Art Institute
- 2024: Prix Elina & Louis Pauwels, Société des Gens de Lettres
- 2025: European Essay prize

In 2020, their report about the restitution of African cultural heritage and its public response earned Bénédicte Savoy and Felwine Sarr the third place in the annual ranking of the "Most influential People in the international Art World", established by ArtReview magazine, and Time magazine listed them among the "100 Most Influential People of 2021".

== See also ==
- Report on the restitution of African cultural heritage
- Decolonization of museums

== Press Articles ==
- Franck-Dumas, Elisabeth (21 December 2020). "Le portrait Bénédicte Savoy, telle éprise qui savait rendre", Libération.
- Julian Lucas (21 December 2025). "The Burgled Louvre's Stolen-Art Expert", The New Yorker.
