= Dahomey raids in Western Yorubaland =

Series of attacks in the 19th century

Dahomey raids on Yoruba People
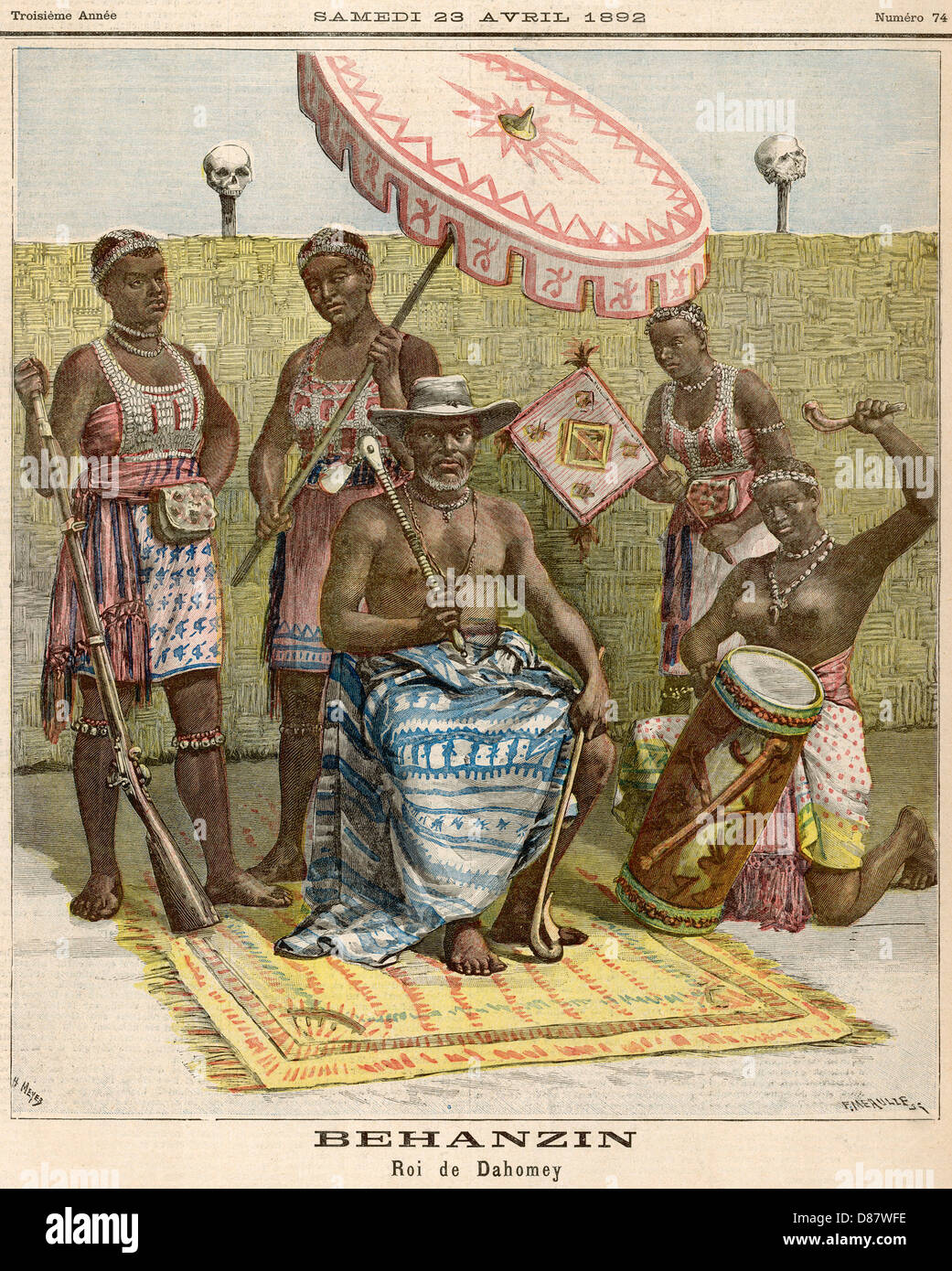
Date	19th century - Scramble for Africa
Location	Benin Republic, Western Yorubaland
Result	Mass enslavement of Yoruba people in the Trans-Atlantic Slave Trade; Conquest of Save, 1848–1885; Conquest of Ketou in 1886; Multiple failed Dahomey invasions of Abeokuta, 1851–1864; Weakening and decline of Dahomey

The Dahomey raids in Western Yorubaland were a series of attacks launched by the Kingdom of Dahomey on nearby areas in western Yorubaland. The raids took place throughout the 19th century. Most of the Yoruba diaspora in the Americas were sold through the Bight of Benin, also known as the slave coast, stretching from eastern Ghana through Togo, Benin, and Western Nigeria. Major ports included Ouidah, Porto-Novo, Badagry, and Lagos. In the later course of the raids, the power and regional influence of Dahomey began to decline after three disastrous losses to the Egbas of Abeokuta, leaving the kingdom weaker.

== Background ==
From the early 18th century until the 1820s, the Kingdom of Dahomey, located in the present-day Republic of Benin, was a tributary state of the Oyo Empire, paying slaves, cloth, and cowries in return for peace, following repeated Oyo military pressure. Under King Ghezo, Dahomey refused to continue its tribute and sought independence and expanded influence. Ghezo defeated Oyo forces at the Battle of Paouingnan in 1823, ending Dahomey’s vassalage, which allowed Dahomey to pursue more aggressive campaigns eastward into former Oyo spheres of influence.

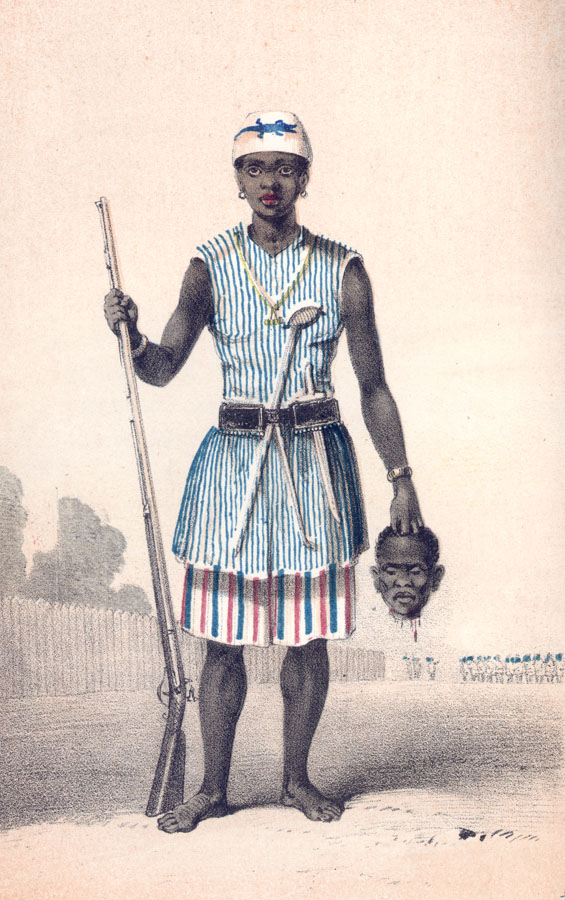
Seh-Dong-Hong-Beh, drawn by Frederick Forbes, 1851.

== Expansion and slave raiding into western Yorubaland ==
Following its independence from Oyo dominance, Dahomey’s military campaigns increasingly targeted neighboring Yoruba-speaking polities for captives to fuel both the Atlantic slave trade and the kingdom’s internal labor demands.

In 1851, King Ghezo physically led a 16,000-strong force of Dahomean soldiers and 2,500 to 6,000 Amazons commanded by Seh-Dong-Hong-Beh, in a failed invasion against the Against the Egba people. This was witnessed and documented by the British naval officer and abolitionist Frederick Edwyn Forbes, who went on two missions to the court of Ghezo in an unsuccessful attempt to convince him to end involvement in the slave trade.

Richard Henry Stone, a Southern Baptist missionary who stayed in Yorubaland for six years, documented these slave-raiding campaigns. He claimed it was a yearly routine for the Dahomey army, a large portion of whom were Dahomey Amazons, to destroy towns not too far away from the capital of Oyo to incite fear in the Yoruba populace. They massacred citizens young and old and brought slaves to the capital, Abomey, to be sold or sacrificed. Stone highlights how the name of the Dahomey would lead to fear and trembling. Stone remarks

“It was not a mitigating circumstance, that a large corps of the Dahomian army was composed of amazons, for these female warriors were nothing better than human tigers.”

In the 1880s, the Nigerian administrator John Otonba Payne wrote on how few knew about the suffering and annual consistency of the Dahomey slave raids.

"Let it be under-stood that the inhabitants of these 3,000 square miles do not, for one third of the year, feel themselves safe from attack, and that this third of the year is the most important"

Areas on Dahomey’s eastern and northeastern frontiers became frequent targets of military raids. Attached to these raids was the capture of civilians who were sold to European slavers at coastal ports such as Whydah (Ouidah), contributing to the dispersal of Yorubas across the Americas.

Kétou (Ketu) was a historic Yoruba kingdom on the present-day border of Nigeria and Benin. Historically, culturally, and linguistically linked to the Oyo polity, Kétou maintained itself as a distinct Yoruba entity into the 19th century. As Dahomey expanded after the Battle of Paouingnan, the Dahomey conquered Ketou in 1886, killed its kings, and captured many citizens, who were enslaved and brought to Abomey. The French later restored Kétou under colonial control after the Second Franco-Dahomean War. Widespread raiding and capture of Kétou inhabitants during the period of Dahomean expansion eastward, accounts for Ketu’s prominence in Afro-Brazilian Yoruba religious traditions such as the Ketu nation of Candomblé, where many enslaved Africans were identified as Ketu before and beyond the formal conquest.

The Kingdom of Save (spelled Ṣábẹ̀ẹ́ in Yoruba) was a historic Yoruba kingdom. During the 19th century attacks from the Kingdom of Dahomey, the Dahomey conquest of Save led to the destruction of the capital, Ile-Savè, in 1848 and again in 1855. A final Dahomey assault in 1885 ended Savè’s independence, after which a Dahomey-aligned king was installed by Glélé, and in 1894 Savè accepted the protectorate of the colony of Dahomey without regaining autonomy.

=== King Adeyemi Letters To The British Empire ===
King Adeyemi Letter To The British Empire
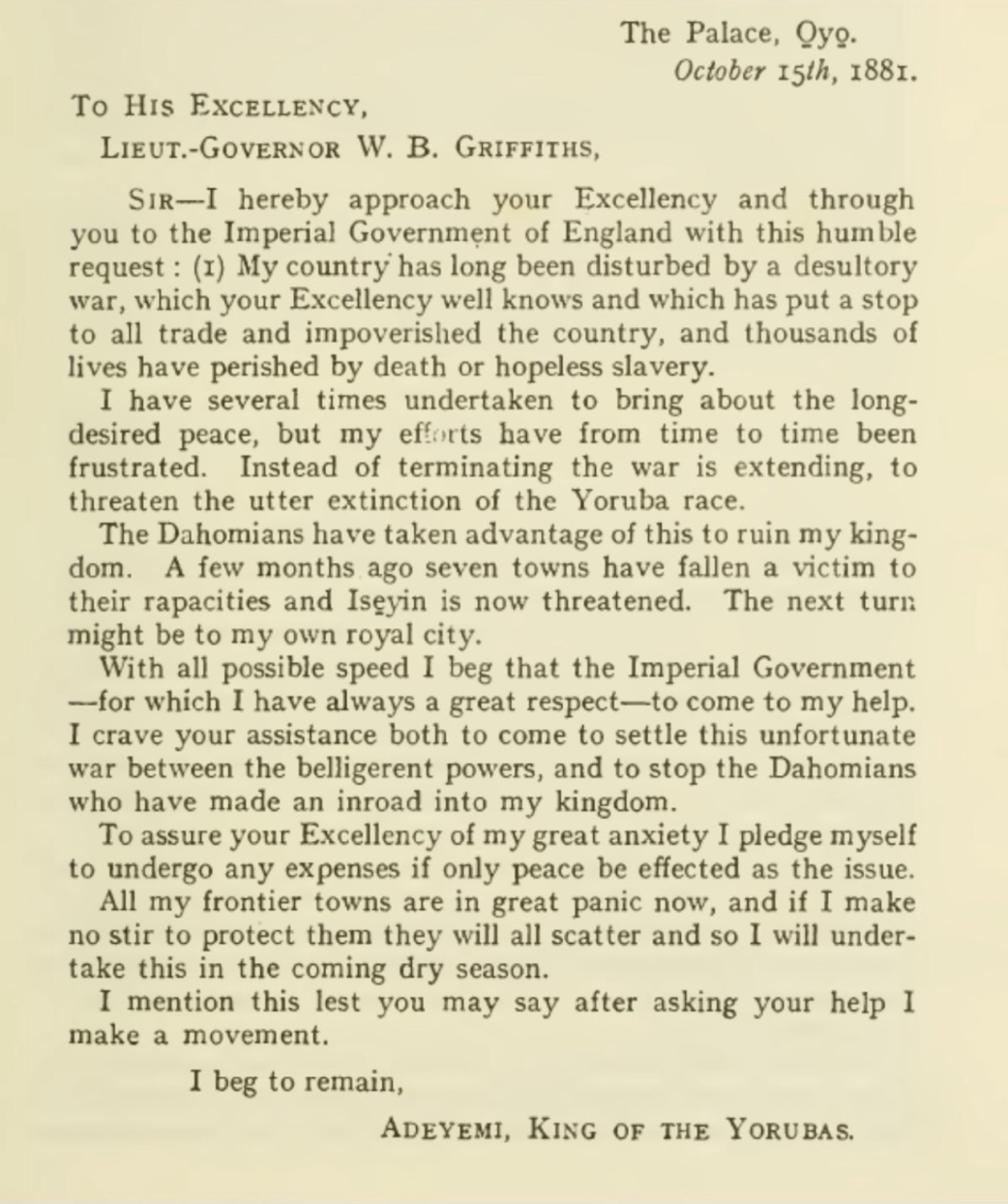
- Author: Alaafin Adeyemi I Alowolodu
- Publisher: Adeyemi I Alowolodu
- Publication date: October 15, 1881

Adeyemi I Alowolodu was the last independent King of the Oyo Kingdom. In 1881, he wrote a letter through Reverend Olubi to the then Governor in Lagos, W.B Griffiths and by extension, the British Empire. The context and motivation behind the letter was the ongoing Kiriji War c.1877—1893 between belligerent western and eastern Yoruba sides, which had left a large portion of the country in ruin, and the subsequent raids by Dahomey which according to him, posed a sustained threat to his kingdom's territory. The internal war and incursions had resulted in casualties, destruction of settlements, and disruption of trade, undermining regional stability.

Unable to effectively bring an end to the ongoing Yoruba civil wars (all his previous efforts having being frustrated) and end the attacks, Dahomey took advantage of Ibadan's pre-occupation across several war fronts and began harassing the upper Ogun towns such as Iganna and Okeho. Adeyemi then sought British assistance as a means of bringing lasting peace, securing protection and deterring further aggression. He mentions further in the letter that he would be making a move against the Dahomians in the coming dry season to protect all the frontier towns from further attacks whether the British came to his aid or not.

==== Content Of the letter ====
The Palace, Oyo.

October 15th, 1881.

To His Excellency, Lieut.-Governor W. B. Griffiths,

Sir— I hereby approach your Excellency and through you to the Imperial Government of England with this humble request:— (1) My country has long been disturbed by a desultory war, which your Excellency well knows and which has put a stop to all trade and impoverished the country, and thousands of lives have perished by death or hopeless slavery.

I have several times undertaken to bring about the long-desired peace, but my efforts have from time to time been frustrated. Instead of terminating the war is extending, to threaten the utter extinction of the Yoruba race.

The Dahomians have taken advantage of this to ruin my kingdom. A few months ago seven towns have fallen a victim to their rapacities and Iseyin is now threatened. The next turn might be to my own royal city.

With all possible speed I beg that the Imperial Government—for which I have always a great respect—to come to my help. I crave your assistance both to come to settle this unfortunate war between the belligerent powers, and to stop the Dahomians who have made an inroad into my kingdom.

To assure your Excellency of my great anxiety I pledge myself to undergo any expenses if only peace be effected as the issue. All my frontier towns are in great panic now, and if I make no stir to protect them they will all scatter and so I will undertake this in the coming dry season.

I mention this lest you may say after asking your help I make a movement.

I beg to remain,

ADEYEMI, King of the Yorubas.

==== Other letters by Adeyemi ====
King Adeyemi wrote multiple letters during his reign, with arguably his most important being his 1881 letter to Lieutenant Governor Griffiths, which started the diplomatic relationship with the Yoruba people and the British empire by asking to be put under British protection. In the same year, on 15 October 1881, Adeyemi also wrote to Rev. J. B. Wood, the Secretary of the Church Missionary Society, describing the continuing war in Oyo and his unsuccessful attempts to establish peace. He appealed to Wood to use his influence to communicate with the British Government. These letters contributed to closer relations with Britain and led to the signing of a treaty on 15 October 1881, which formalized British involvement in the area.

Later treaties included the 1888 British and Yoruba Treaty, signed by Alaafin Adeyemi of Oyo and Queen Victoria, establishing peace, friendship, and exclusive trade, officially bringing all Yoruba kingdoms under British protection. Thomas Carter signed a “treaty of friendship” and commerce with Oba Osokalu, the Alake of Egbaland, at Abeokuta. Then on February 3, 1893, he concluded a similar treaty with Oba Adeyemi, the Alafin of Oyo. These treaties helped open the Yoruba country to greater British involvement and influence.

Adeyemi’s treaty with Carter also shows his diplomatic efforts during a period when European colonial power was rapidly expanding in West Africa. Rather than simply being a passive figure during this period, Adeyemi was involved in negotiations and agreements with British officials as he tried to protect Oyo’s position during the growing colonial presence.

== Egba leadership and resistance ==
Sodeke was the commander-in-chief of the Egba army during the critical period of Dahomey incursions. He organized Egba defenses and mobilized the population, becoming a key leader in the resistance against Dahomean attacks and in securing Abeokuta’s autonomy. Oshodi was an Egba war chief noted for leading Egba forces in several engagements against Dahomey, including battles at Oke-Adan and Imoshe. His military leadership helped slow Dahomey advances and protect Egba communities. After the death of Sodeke, his son Shodeke succeeded him as Egba commander-in-chief and led Egba forces in the final phase of the conflict, including the Battle of Ikirun. His leadership helped conclude the Egba–Dahomey wars with sustained Egba resistance. Madam Efunroye Tinubu was a prominent Egba trader and political figure who provided crucial financial and material support to Egba defenses against Dahomey. Tinubu used her connections with coastal British merchants and political leaders to help acquire firearms and negotiate for assistance, strengthening Abeokuta’s resistance and symbolizing Yoruba unity against Dahomey military pressure.

== Yoruba diaspora ==
British naval blockades and anti-slave trade pressure after the 1840s further weakened Dahomey’s economic base, forcing a transition toward palm oil exports and a decline in slave raids. Egba and allied Yoruba communities maintained autonomy and expanded political influence in the region.

Raids on Kétou and other Yoruba polities contributed to the diasporic Yoruba presence in the Americas, particularly in Brazil and Cuba, where descendants identify with historical Yoruba kingdoms.

The history of Kétou’s conquest and the capture of its inhabitants is reflected in cultural memory and religious traditions such as the Ketu nation of Candomblé.

Alaba Ida was a notable Kétou royal who was captured and enslaved during Dahomey’s 1886 conquest, remembered for her connection to the kingdom’s royal lineage and as a symbol of the Yoruba people displaced by the slave trade.

Some notable Yoruba people who were captured by Dahomey in slave raids following the collapse of the Oyo Empire include Sarah Forbes Bonetta (Aina), Cudjoe Lewis (Oluale Kossola), Matilda McCrear (Abake), Redoshi, and Seriki Williams Abass (Ifaremilekun Fagbemi).

== See also ==
- Battle of Paouginan
- Dahomey Conquest of Ketou
- Dahomey Conquest of Save
