= Battle of Paouingnan =

19th century Yoruba-Dahomey battle

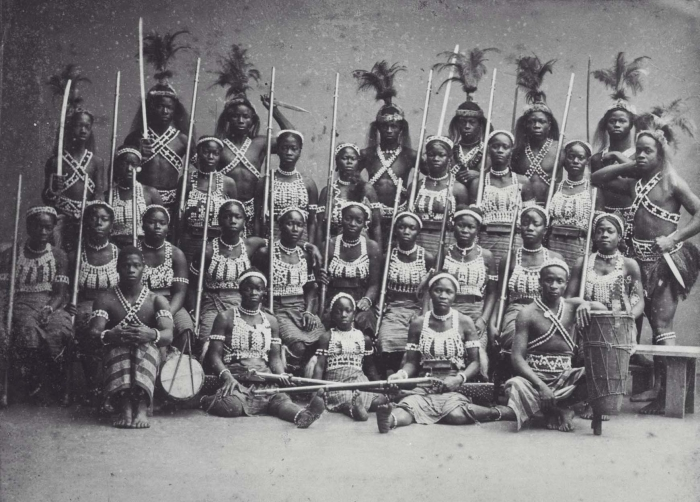
- A group portrait of the "Amazons from Dahomey" during their stay in Paris, 1891
Date	1823
Location	Between Paouingnan and Kétou, Benin 7.6778°N 2.2270°E
Result	Decisive Dahomey victory
Territorial changes	End of Dahomey’s tributary status to Oyo; Dahomey raids on Yoruba; Oyo Empire weakened; Leading to eventual conquest of Multiple Yoruba Kingdoms like Kétou and Kingdom of Savé

Belligerents
Kingdom of Dahomey	Oyo Empire

Commanders and leaders
King Ghezo	Ajanaku

Units involved
Dahomey Amazons	Oyo Empire, and calvary unit

Strength
4,000	Unknown

Casualties and losses
Unknown	Heavy

Following Oyo’s invasions of Dahomey in the early 18th century, the Dahomean king Agaja agreed to pay an annual tribute in slaves, cloth, and cowries to Oyo in exchange for peace and limited autonomy. Ghezo’s reorganized army notably included the elite corps of female soldiers known as the Mino or Dahomey Amazons, who played a key role in defending the kingdom and projecting its military power. The battle took place between Paouingnan and Ketou.

The Dahomean forces, reinforced by Ghezo’s reorganized army and the Mino, repelled Oyo’s expeditionary troops along the northern frontier near the modern Benin–Nigeria border, forcing Oyo to abandon its attempt to enforce tribute and securing Dahomey’s independence. This arrangement continued for nearly a century, symbolizing Oyo’s dominance over the coastal and interior polities of Yorubaland and the Fon kingdom of Dahomey. By the early nineteenth century, however, Oyo’s power had begun to decline due to internal conflicts, Fulani pressure from the north, and the weakening of its military authority When King Ghezo (r. 1818–1858) came to the throne of Dahomey, he refused to maintain the tribute payments. Oyo attacked, and the conflict culminated in Dahomean victories over Oyo forces sent to re-impose control, effectively ending Dahomey’s tributary relationship.

This significant battle led to multiple victorious campaigns and slave raids against the Egbado and Ketu. In the mid-19th century, the Dahomey army attacked Egba towns, taking prisoners, some of whom were later sacrificed, provoking outrage among the Egba people.

== See also ==
- Dahomey raids on Yoruba
- Dahomey Conquest of Ketou
- Dahomey Conquest of Save
