= Martine de Souza (tour guide) =

Beninese tour guide

Martine de Souza is a Beninese tour guide. She is a member of the De Souza family.

== Life ==
A descendant of Francisco Felix de Sousa along her paternal line, De Souza is a prominent voice for reconciliation between the descendants of slave traders like him and those of slaves. She is descended along her maternal line from Joaquim João Dias Lima, another prominent Brazilian slave trader in Dahomey during the late 1800s.

Dias Lima's wife, Marie, was a Nigerian captured by Agojie and sold as a slave to Dias Lima, who later married her. Martine de Souza and her mother, Lali, share the story of their ancestress with the actress Lupita Nyong'o during the filming of the documentary Warrior Women with Lupita Nyong'o in Benin. In reference to Marie's having been a slave, she is quoted as saying,

What else can we do? We have to forgive.

De Souza is one of the leading tour guides in Benin, not only having provided guide services to Nyong'o, but also for Henry Louis Gates Jr. and PBS, National Geographic and NBC.
