= Dahomey conquest of Save =

19th century conquest of a Yoruba kingdom by Dahomey

Conquest of Save
Date	1848 - 1885
Location	Savè, modern-day Benin Republic 08°02′N 02°29′E
Result	Dahomey victory
Territorial changes	Capital city of ile-Save destroyed in 1848, and 1855, deserted for 25 years, conquered again by Dahomey in 1885; Kingdom of Savé conquered by Dahomey in 1885; Prior raids on Yoruba-speaking communities in Benin

Belligerents
Kingdom of Dahomey	Kingdom of Savé , Yoruba Allies

Commanders and leaders
Glele Béhanzin	Oba Alamu, Onisabe

Units involved
Kingdom of Dahomey	Kingdom of Save

Strength
Unknown	Unknown

Casualties and losses
Minor	Heavy

The Dahomey conquest of Savè' refers to a series of military incursions and destructive campaigns carried out by the Kingdom of Dahomey against the Yoruba kingdom of Savè (also known as Chabè or Ṣàbẹ́) during the 19th century. The Dahomey campaigns brought repeated raids into Yoruba border states and destabilized Savè’s political structure.

== Background ==
The Kingdom of Save Sabé (Yoruba: Ṣábẹ̀ẹ́) was a Yoruba kingdom located in the modern day Benin-Nigeria border centered around the city of ile-Save or ile-Sabe, it rose in the 18th century as a city state, and cultural groups connected with the Yoruba identity, descending from Oduduwa.

== Dahomey’s conquest ==
During King Ghezo's reign, Dahomey had started to expand and raid neighboring Yoruba-speaking kingdoms. During his reign, Dahomey burned the capital city of Save in 1848, destroying an estimated "143 localities". In 1855, it was destroyed again. After this, the city was not fully inhabited for 25 years because of the totality of the destruction. After this period the city was inhabited again, until a final and decisive phase of conflict occurred in 1885, when Dahomey forces under the expansionist policies of Glélé launched a campaign that resulted in the definitive destruction of Ilé-Savè. Dahomey was conquered by France after the Second Fanco-Dahomean war in 1894, which returned the kingdom back to native rule.

== See also ==
- Dahomey raids on Yoruba
- Battle of Paouignan
- Dahomey Conquest of Ketou
