= Warrior Women with Lupita Nyong'o =

2019 documentary

- Directed by: Anna Cox
- Produced by: Anna Cox
- Starring: Lupita Nyong'o
- Narrated by: Lupita Nyong'o
- Cinematography: Neil Harvey & Tim Knight
- Edited by: Sean Mackenzie
- Music by: Thomas Farnon & Babatunde Adefuye
- Production company: Sandstone Global Productions
- Distributed by: Channel 4
- Release date: 23 October 2019
- Country: United Kingdom
- Language: English

Warrior Women with Lupita Nyong'o is a 2019 documentary about the actress' journey to Benin to learn about the history and culture of an all-woman army, the Ahosi (Ahojie or Ahoji), referred to by early European historians as the Amazons of Dahomey. The film explores the evolution of Lupita Nyong'o's understanding of the Ahosi, from her glorification of the women warriors at the onset of the film to her ultimate comprehension of Ahosi's complicated history at the film's conclusion.

== Production notes ==
=== Presenter ===
The documentary film is presented by and features Lupita Nyong'o. She selected the project because of her previous work playing the role of the Wakanda spy and former Dora Milaje warrior, Nakia, in Black Panther. Her experience acting in the role compelled her to learn more about the Ahosi. The documentary film, according to Nyong'o, was part of her attempt to de-colonize her mind after receiving an education skewed towards the Western world.

Nyong'o described the feeling of being overwhelmed by historical information during the making of the film, and then reconciling what she learned about the Ahosi with her previous understanding. She describes it in terms of a dichotomy: "The Agoji women were involved in the slave trade and that has changed the dynamics and polarisation of Benin to this day. On one hand, they are a symbol of the power of the feminine but they are also the pain… they caused the pain."

=== Production team ===
The film was commissioned by Shaminder Nahal and directed and produced by Anna Cox for Sandstone Global Productions. The soundtrack was scored by Thomas Farnon and Babatunde Adefuye. Professor Olivette Otele served as history advisor.

=== Release ===
The film premiered on Channel 4 in the United Kingdom 23 October 2019, during its Black History Month celebration. Channel 4 released a trailer on its YouTube channel the same day. It debuted in the United States on the Smithsonian Channel 28 March 2022, during its Women's History Month programming.

== Summary ==
The documentary film Warrior Women with Lupita Nyong'o begins with Lupita Nyong'o traveling by car to Abomey while she narrates on and off camera about her experience working on Black Panther and how the movie has impacted a global audience; yet she knows very little about the Ahosi, which inspired the film's Dora Milaje characters. Along the way, she stops to meet Martine de Souza, a Beninese guide, and they continue to the Royal Palaces of Abomey, the ancestral home of Dahomey's Ahosu (king). There they greet the ruler, Dah Sagbadjou Glele, who allows them to view Dahomeyan artifacts in restricted areas of the palace grounds. They view a fresco showing panthers guarding crossed swords, bas-relief depictions of Ahosi combat, and the preserved throne of Ahosu Ghezo, which rests on the skulls of Dahomeyan enemies.

Nyong'o travels next to a rural area where she is shown an underground tunnel network once used by the Ahosi to ambush enemies approaching the Palaces. She returns to the palace grounds to speak with the Beninese historian, Nondichao Bacharou. He shares with her how women ages 15 to 34 were conscripted and put through "brutal" training and indoctrination to become Ahosi. As she leaves the palaces, she realizes that her previous belief of "the Ahosi being a beacon of enlightened feminism, like the Dora Milaje in Wakanda, is long gone."

She travels to the location of the Battle of Cana, where she learns a force of 1,200 Ahosi were decimated by the French military in 1892. An estimated 60 Ahosi survived and Nyong'o decides to seek the descendants of the remaining Ahosi. She meets Metchonou Etienne, the grandson of a legendary Ahosi warrior, Alewomman. Etienne performs a Voudoun ritual allowing her to visit the burial place of Alewomman, after which she observes a ceremonial Egungun dance by descendants of Yoruba slaves captured by Alewommen.

Nyong'o is summoned by the Ahosu to return to the palace, where she is led to an area she was not allowed previously, and there she meets an elderly woman. Nyong'o learns that the woman's mother was a surviving Ahosi and the elderly woman was raised in the Ahosi way as a child. After meeting the Ahosi elder, Nyong'o is struck by the coincidence of meeting an Ahosi in person on the same day Black Panther was nominated for seven Oscar awards.

Her guide, Martine de Souza, invites Nyong'o to meet her mother, Lali. Lali shares the story of her grandmother, Marie, who at the age of 15 was captured by Ahosi in Nigeria and brought to Dahomey to be sold as a slave. A slave trader bought Marie, then took her for his wife. Shocked that Martine did not tell her previously during their travels together, Nyong'o asks Martine how can she reconcile praising the Ahosi after what has happened to her family? Martine responds, "What else can we do? We have to forgive."

The film ends with Nyong'o coming to The Door of No Return, a monument memorializing over two million victims of the Slave Coast. As she walks around the monument, then out to the beach to sit facing the ocean, she narrates her struggle to process all she has learned. She concludes: "[U]ntil now we hadn't really – I hadn't really – heard the other side of the story. It came down from this historic, almost, like, glorious remembrance to just the hard, brutal truth of what were some of the outcomes of their actions. As much as we – I like their strengths, we have also to acknowledge their crimes ... I think it's also really important to be aware of the truth because you are better equipped to face the future, you know, when you can really consider and take into account your past."

== Critical response ==
=== Reviews ===
Suzanne Feay of the Financial Times gives 5 of 5 stars, describing Nyong'o as "an apt choice of investigator as she travels to the Republic of Benin in west Africa on the trail of the famed Agoji ... but finds on closer inspection the true story of the Agoji is far darker than she imagined."

"This is not a neat tale of indisputably impressive badassery or triumph over evil. It’s messy; it’s history. But with 15 minutes to go before the end of the documentary, it’s a lesson that comes almost too late," writes Kuba Shand-Baptiste for the Independent (UK), giving it 4 of 5 stars.

Carol Midgley gives 3 of 5 stars in The Times (UK), saying, "The last ten minutes of Warrior Women with Lupita Nyong'o proved an important corrective to the romantic, reverential stories that we had heard so far of the Agoji."

The Guardian's Ellen E. Jones gives 4 of 5 stars, noting, "[Y]our average historian probably wouldn’t have had the Oscar-commended empathy required to conduct Nyong’o’s most moving interview."

Warrior Women with Lupita Nyong'o was iNews' Gerard Gilbert's Pick of the Day and Sarah Hughes' 4 of 4 star review acknowledged that, "Intriguing as the story was, it was also not straightforward. There’s a fine line between freedom and oppression and the longer that the likeable and enthusiastic Nyong’o spent on the Agojie story the more complicated it became."

Sean O'Grady for Independent (UK) gave it a positive review, writing, "An outstanding and novel contribution to Black History Month from Channel 4, and excellent in its own right."

The film was John Dugdale's critic's choice for The Times (UK), which stated, "Up to [a] point the film is a celebration of bygone girl power but then a more complicated picture emerges, with a darker side to the Agoji first hinted at in a dance commemorating Igbo prisoners they seized."

=== Awards ===
Warrior Women with Lupita Nyong'o received Television Business International's 2020 Content Innovation Award for Factual TV Project of the Year.

== In the media ==
In an editorial for The Telegraph (UK), Helen Brown discusses her concern how efforts to provide strong feminine role models could lead to "airbrushing these complex women into cartoon superheroes." Brown describes Nyong'o's struggle to reconcile a Dora Milaje ideal with Ahosi history in feminist terms, explaining, "The messiness of human reality, [Nyong'o said], is what makes us yearn for the clear-cut heroes and villains of Marvel-style fantasy universes. And fantasy could really step up for feminism."

In an opinion editorial for The New Yorker, Julian Lucas writes a critique about the historical accuracy of The Woman King in which he uses Women Warriors with Lupita Nyong'o to clinch his argument. He notes that Nyong'o was originally cast in a leading role for The Woman King but she was not involved in its final production. Lucus concludes his critique with, "Nyong’o has given no public explanation for dropping out of “The Woman King." But I suspect that she left precisely because of these reservations. If so, it is much to her credit that she refused to kill her tears."
