= Dahomey conquest of Ketou =

19th century conquest of a Yoruba kingdom by Dahomey

Conquest of Ketou
Date	1886
Location	Kétou, Benin 7°21′29″N 2°36′27″E
Result	Decisive Dahomey victory
Territorial changes	Kétou conquered by Dahomey in 1886; Prior raids on Yoruba-speaking communities in Benin

Belligerents
Kingdom of Dahomey	Kingdom of Kétou and Yoruba allies

Commanders and leaders
Glele Béhanzin	Agidigbo Hungbo

Units involved
Kingdom of Dahomey	Kingdom of Ketou

Strength
Unknown	Unknown

Casualties and losses
Minor	Heavy

The Dahomey conquest of Ketou was a series of military campaigns in which Dahomey defeated and conquered the Kingdom of Ketou, in modern day Benin.

== Background ==
=== Kingdom of Dahomey ===
The Kingdom of Dahomey was a West African state from approximately 1600 until its annexation by France in 1894 located in present-day southern Benin. Beginning as a relatively minor inland polity, it gradually expanded to dominate the regional slave trade through control of coastal ports, particularly Ouidah, and developed into one of the most centralized and bureaucratic kingdoms in pre-colonial Africa. The kingdom had a standing army, which included the agojie, the elite female warriors whom European traders and missionaries referred to as "Amazons" Dahomey's rulers, notably Ghezo (r. 1818–1858) and Glélé (r. 1858–1889), maintained their power through frequent military campaigns against rival states such as the Oyo Empire. European colonial expansion in the late 19th century ultimately undermined Dahomey's sovereignty and lead to the first Franco-Dahomean War, resulting in French victory. The second Franco-Dahomean War followed and resulted in military defeat, the capture and exile of King Béhanzin in 1894

=== Kétou ===
Kétou (also spelled Ketu or Queto) was a historic Yoruba kingdom and subgroup whose territory spanned parts of modern-day southeastern Benin and southwestern Nigeria, with its traditional capital at the town of Kétou.According to Ketu oral tradition, Kétou rankdc among the 16 original kingdoms founded by descendants of Oduduwa, with the town established by Sopasan.

== Conquest by Dahomey ==
Kétou was a major trading kingdom, with an extensive defensive mud-brick wall that was only accessible through a singular entryway known as the Akaba Idena. The trenches of the Akaba Idena may have been as deep as 15 to 20 feet. Dahomey launched two raids against Kétou, ultimately destroying the kingdom. First happening in 1882 - 1883, under the reign of Glele, which deeply weakened the kingdom. In 1886, Kétou was sacked and looted, with its temples and altars destroyed, and its houses burned, all under Glele’s personal direction. Its people were sent into slavery in Abomey after its chiefs were summarily executed.

Kétou was later conquered by the French in 1894, putting it back under Yoruba sovereignty.

== See also ==
- Dahomey raids on Yoruba
- Battle of Paouignan
- Dahomey Conquest of Save
