= Egba-Dahomey War =

19th century wars between the Kingdom of Dahomey and the Egba people of Abeokuta

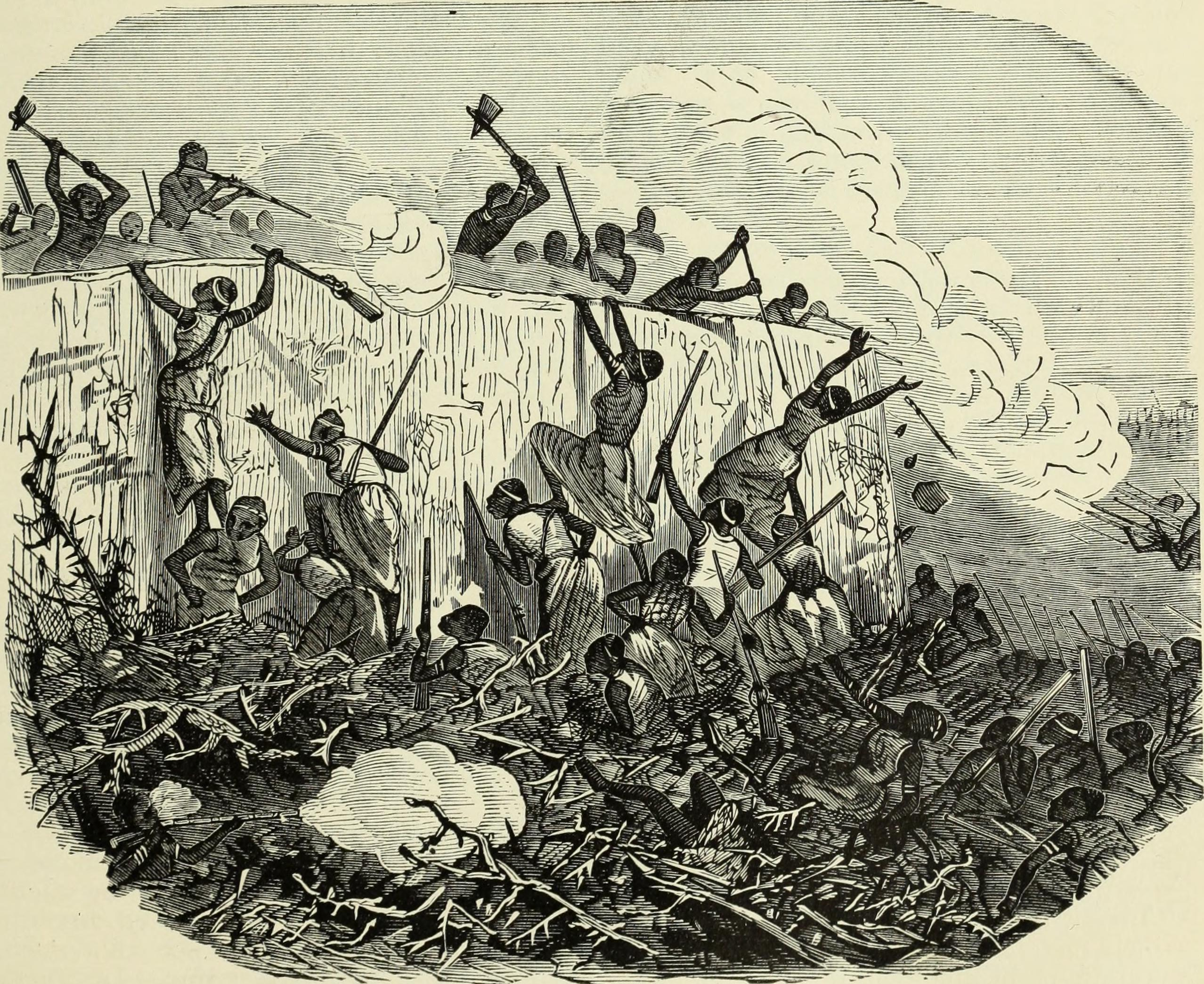
- Invading Dahomeans at the city walls of Abeokuta
| Date | 1844 — 1864 |
| Location | Abeokuta, Imojolu (Ado Odo), Ishaga, Ekpo, Ibara. |
| Result | Egban victory: Dahomey is severely weakened. |

Belligerents
| Kingdom of Dahomey; Supported By: Kingdom of Lagos under Oba Kosoko; French colonial volunteers | Egba people Supported By: Lagos Colony; Church Mission Society |

Commanders and leaders
| Akati (Gau) †; Ghezo (Ahosu) † Seh-Dong Hong-Beh (Agojie leader) (MIA) | Shokenu (Seriki); Ogunbona (Balogun of Ikija); Shomoye (Bashorun); Ogundipe of Ikija |

Units involved
| Dahomey Amazons | Unknown |

Strength
| First invasion 16,000 Regulars; 2,500-6,000 Amazons Second invasion 10K-14,000 Regulars: 1,500-3,000 Amazons | First invasion 15,000 Second invasion Unknown |

Casualties and losses
| First invasion 3,000 killed 1,000 captured Second invasion 4,500 - 6,820 killed 1,500 captured | First invasion 'Substantial' 'Not serious' Second invasion 50 killed 100 wounded |
- Destruction of many Egba and Yewa (Egbado) villages, including; Refurefu, Ishaga (1862) and Ibara (1863).

The Egba-Dahomey War, also known as the Abeokuta-Dahomey War was a series of mid 19th century military engagements between the Egba people of Yorubaland with their capital at Abeokuta and the Fon Kingdom of Dahomey with its capital at Abomey. It was part of the series of conflicts that characterized Yorubaland and the surrounding region following the fall of the Oyo Empire in 1836. During the course of the war, Dahomey launched two separate full-scale direct invasions of Abeokuta itself, both of which ended in failure and led to the weakening of Dahomey, its decline as a regional power, and its eventual colonization by the French.

== General background ==
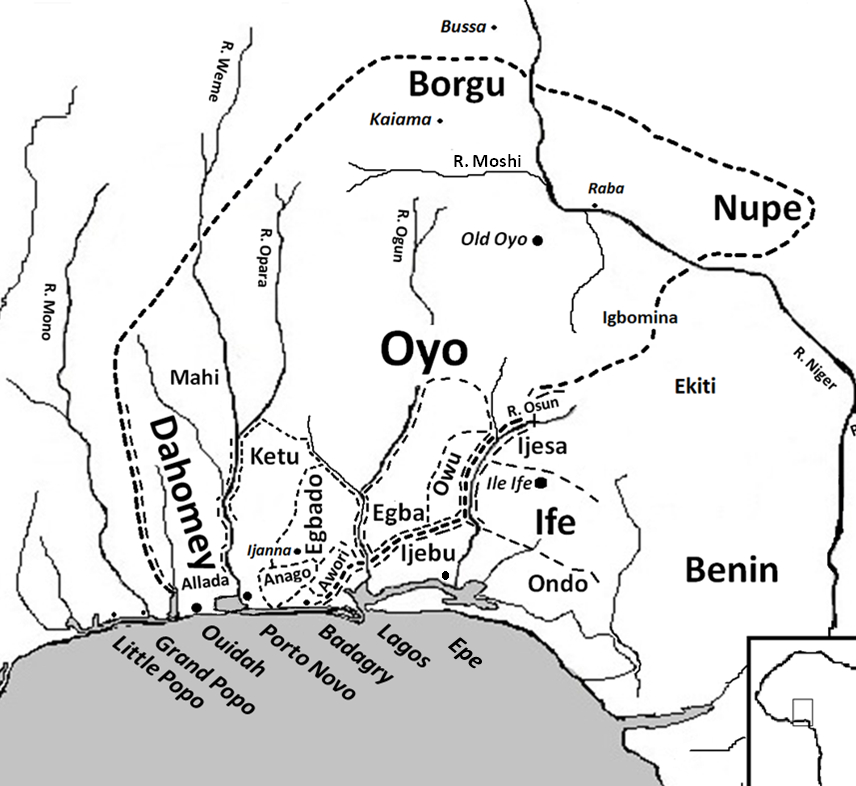
Frontiers of the Oyo kingdom c. 1780.

The Oyo Empire, the most significant regional power in the area, had begun declining since the late 1700s following the death of Bashorun Gaha the tyrannical prime minister of the empire who had caused the forceful abdication and subsequent ritual suicide of four Alaafins in quick succession. Gaha himself was eventually captured and killed during the reign of Abiodun (Adegorolu) by Kakanfo Oyabi. However, his legacy of disrespect and disregard for the most revered office in the land had dealt a serious blow to the prestige of the Alaafin across the empire.

In the meantime, the Empire had reached its apogee, stretching north across the Niger basin; taking in large portions of the Nupe to the northeast and Borgu kingdoms to the northwest. Towards the southwest and west by the sea coast was the constituent vassal kingdom of Dahomey.

Following the death of Gaha, the military prowess and internal cohesion of the empire began to suffer. First to declare independence were the southern Borgu kingdoms in 1783 during Abiodun's reign. However, they continued to pay tributes to the empire until the year 1818. Following the Borgus to rebel were the Nupes in 1791 during the reign of Awole. The empire's losses continued to mount with the Egbas themselves revolting massively and declaring their autonomy in 1796. The disintegration in the state of affairs took a sudden turn for the worse after Awole's order for an attack against the Ife market town of Apomu led to further depreciation in the prestige of the Alaafin's position and plunged the Yoruba country into a state of civil war (Owu–Ife war). Afonja the Aare Ona kakanfo declared independence from the empire from his base at Ilorin, building a mostly Muslim and multi-ethnic fighting force menacing the northern territories. Cohesion faltered further, and the empire's various army officers began to create "little kingdoms" for themselves.

Eventually, the Dahomeans under Ahosu (king) Ghezo broke away from the depleted Oyo Empire under Alaafin Majotu in 1823 at the height of the Owu–Ife war and the troubles of Ilorin rebellion which had left the empire's western garrisons thinly manned, ending its nearly 95 years long (since 1730) vassal kingdom status.

== Origins and prelude ==
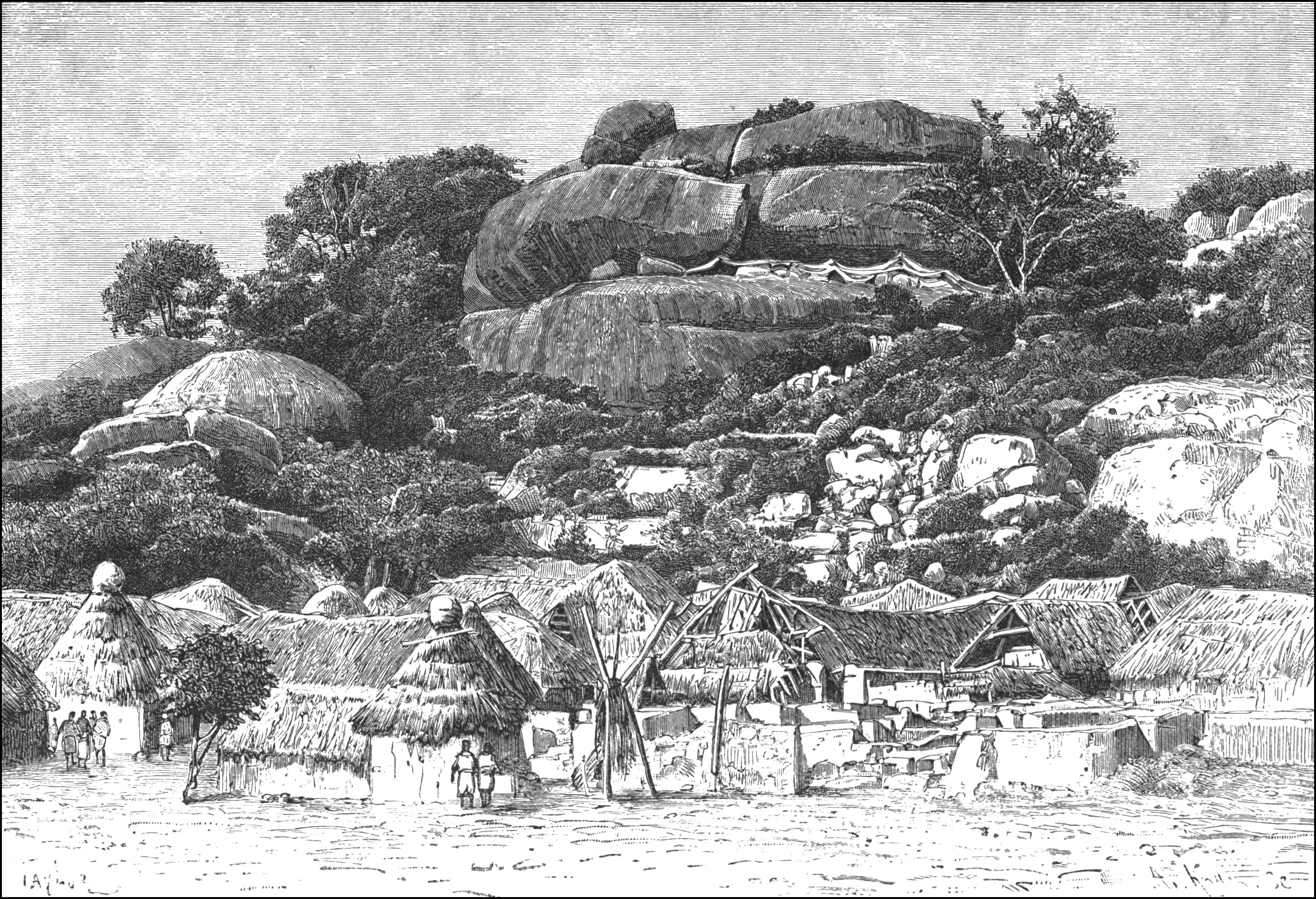
The Olumo rock of Abeokuta

Following the Egba declaration of independence, and the destruction of many of their towns and villages, they founded the city state of Abeokuta (lit.: under the rock/stone) in 1830 close to the banks of the lower Ogun River on the site of what was then a small farmstead near a large protective boulder and rock shelter called Oke Olumo in a migration led by Balogun Shodeke of Iporo. The new city developed a confederacy with place-name reduplications of the different former Egba towns, villages and origins of the founder groups which populated them, such was the case for Igbore, Itoku, Ake, Owu, Igbehin and Ikija. The population of Abeokuta began to grow rapidly, by 1842, it had swollen to an estimated 45,000 people, and by 1851, it had reached between 50,000 and 60,000, some visitors estimating it to be as high as 100,000 inhabitants.

=== The rise of Abeokuta ===
It wasn't long after its foundation before Abeokuta had to fight several battles all through the 1830s for its own survival against long-time traditional enemies who wanted it destroyed. Under the command of Balogun Shodeke, Ilorin was defeated and turned back. Next came the combined forces of Ijebu and Ota who were also beaten at the Owiwi War. The army of Ibadan was equally repulsed at the Arakanga War in their unsuccessful quest to vanquish the city. News of these successes in war traveled far and wide including to Dahomey, whose king then sought an alliance with the new city-state, but the Egbas came to be just as hated as much as they were feared.

The status of Abeokuta as a rising power continued to grow through the 1840s, and it soon began to pursue its own regional economic and political interests such as the quest for a southern coastal port and an independent trading corridor. Although reports on the level of Abeokuta's own involvement in slave dealing before this period are mixed and sometimes conflicting, all commercial activity conducted in and by the city was fully legal by the mid-1840s. The city had now become a safe haven for all the surrounding populations from the slave trade and had also become the center of missionary activity and the legitimate commodity trade (such as palm oil and cotton) in the region. The competing ideologies, regional interests/ambitions and economic activities of the Egba kingdom of Abeokuta and that of Dahomey were bound to clash eventually.

=== Dahomey's resolution ===
Dahomey's Elephant Party faction, comprising the crown, the wealthiest Creole traders such as the de Souza family, and the highest male military officials were advocates in favour of continuing the long established practice of capturing, trading and exporting slaves and thus wanted Abeokuta, the kingdom's natural rising rival and city of refuge destroyed. Beecroft mentions that the main theme of amazon songs at the Hwetanu (annual custom ceremony) of 1850 was for the king to allow them to go attack Abeokuta. "All the 'petty nations' in the region had been conquered"— they sang; "Only two 'Great nations' remained." "It was impossible for two rams to feed out of the same stall, their horns must get entangled". "So Dahomey and Abeokuta could not co-exist".

In 1849–50, under the direction of British Governor William Winniett, British naval officer Frederick E. Forbes went on two missions to the court of King Ghezo in an unsuccessful attempt to convince him to end involvement in the slave trade. Starting from about the fifth decade of the nineteenth century until practically the close of it, Dahomey tried repeatedly but unsuccessfully to annihilate the Egba kingdom.

== Beginning of hostilities ==
=== Antebellum ===
The Dahomeyans moved first. The first victims of their ire was the Yoruba commercial city of Atakpame to their west in modern day Togo, after which they turned towards the petty Yoruba kingdoms to their east. In the mid 1830's the Egbado village of Refurefu was sacked and destroyed.

The Egbas on their own part were pressing southwards towards the coast to secure their economic and military interests in the interior. They took over the Awori towns of Ota in 1835 and 1842 (in order to open a direct link with the port of Badagry), and then Ado in 1844, where they would encounter the Dahomeans.

=== First military confrontation (The battle of Imojolu) ===
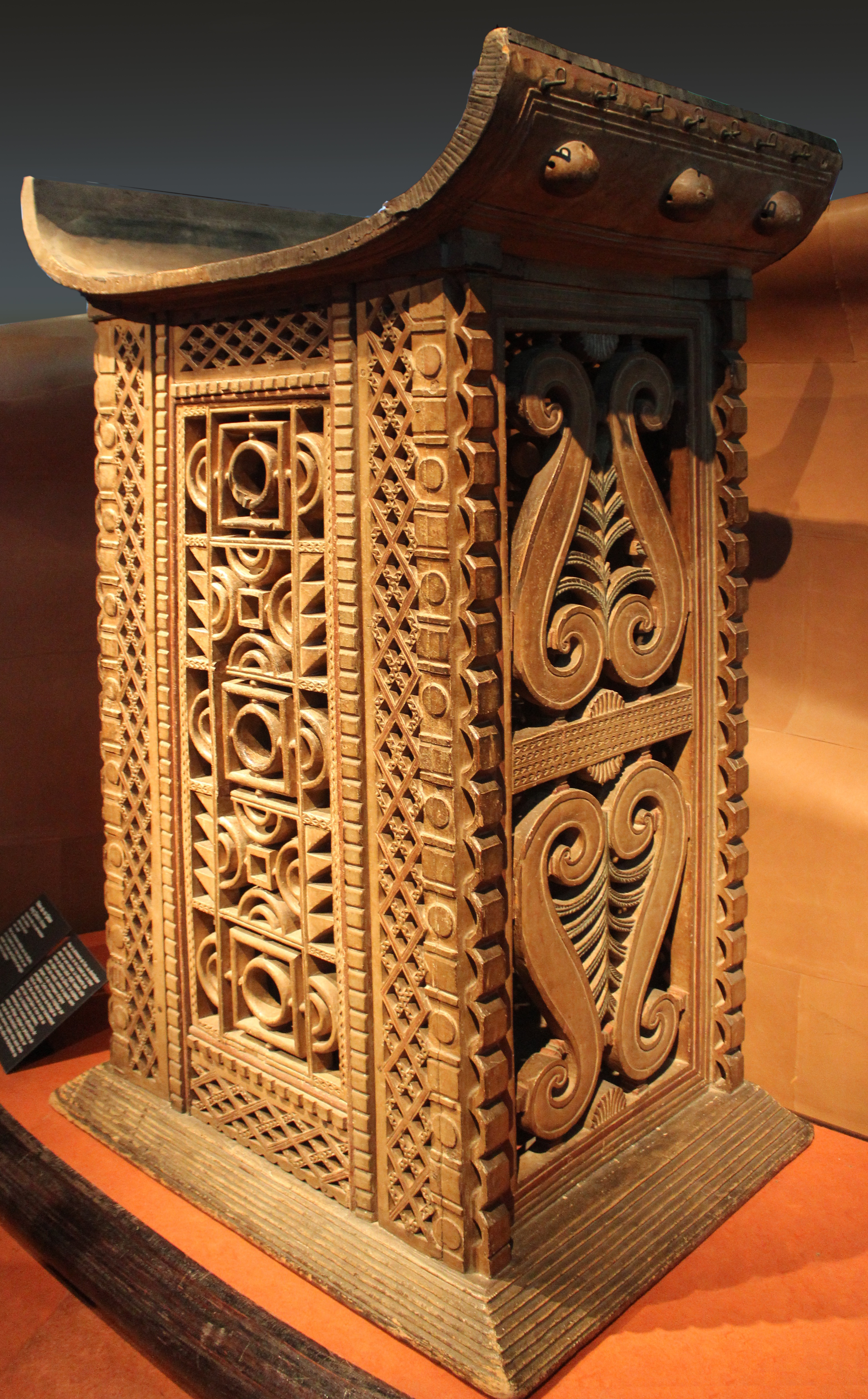
Royal stool of Dahomey belonging to Ghezo

The Egba and Dahomey engaged in their first open military combat in early 1844 when their forces came into contact and clashed in the village of Imojolu, near the Awori town of Ado-Odo. According to the Dahomeans, the causus belli for their involvement was that Ado was in a territory belonging to Porto-Novo and was therefore a legitimate part of Dahomean territory. The Egbas however considered the territory of Ado and the Egbado area as home turf and saw the Dahomey presence there as an encroachment. Moreover, Shodeke had died in 1842, and the Dahomeans upon hearing this had decided to attack the Egbas at Ado, an act they considered treacherous.

The battle between the two sides resulted in an Egba victory. The Dahomean force was led by king Ghezo himself and at the end, many officers were lost. The throne (royal stool), royal umbrella (described as the war standard of the army), war totems/charms and other royal paraphernalia of Dahomey were also captured by the triumphant Egba forces and Ghezo himself only narrowly escaped capture. This encounter confirmed the rising profile of Abeokuta to the dahomeans and sowed the seeds for further hostile clashes between the two ascending and ambitious states. According to captain Forbe's 1851 account, Abeokuta also destroyed an Amazon regiment in 1848, although the exact details were not explicit.

Ahosu Ghezo then joined forces and hatched a plan with his "fellow slaver" and ally, Oba Kosoko of Lagos. The details of their military stratagem was for Dahomey to attack Abeokuta while Lagos would attack Badagry simultaneously In March 1851.

== First battle of Abeokuta (1st Egba – Dahomey war) ==
Around mid February 1851, Dahomey's forces set out to invade Abeokuta. The Dahomey army consisted of around 16,000 male troops and between 2,500 and 5,000 Amazons according to R. F. Burton who was in Agbome (Abomey). On the first of March, the Fon Dahomeans reached the Yoruba town of Ishaga 25.75 kilometres (16.00 mi) west of Abeokuta. Oba koko (Ashade Okogan), the king of Ishaga pretended to co-operate with the Dahomeans, but secretly sent word forward to the Egba informing them of the approaching invaders.

Oba Koko of Ishaga also fed them wrong intelligence which made the invading column cross the Ogun River at a deeper area dampening some of the gunpowder, attack the city at midday rather than before dawn (supposedly because the Egba men would either be taking a siesta or away working at the farms), and launch their attack of the city from the southwestern or Aro gate, a section of the city walls which was in very good condition instead of the northwestern gate which had been left in a dilapidated state. The Fon followed the Oba's counsel to the very letter, even though they had gotten more accurate information from at least one other spy(ies) who had successfully scouted Abeokuta before hand.

Around noon on the third of March, the Dahomeans struck. Immediately the Egbas sensed the Dahomean approach, the battle cry; Elélè m'élè! (lit. Each person to his cutlass!) was called by the women, and the wall and gates were manned by the Ologun. Armed men marched out of the Badagry facing gate in three parties; one stayed near the wall, another group under Ogunbona crossed the river near the wall and the third proceeded half a mile to the ford on the Badagry road.

The heavy Dahomey squadron split in two units, one approached the ford and the other, led by Ghezo charged at Ogunbona's unit which retreated towards the river, requesting the wall division to cover their crossing. Ogunbona then rallied and the battle began. The unit at the ford also retreated, closely pressed by the Dahomeans and some deserted, but the majority held their ground. The walls and gates were heavily defended with swords and guns, cutting down the enemy at the entrance. The battle then came to a lull on both sides interrupted by periods of sharp skirmishing. Shokenu the commander-in chief then led an outflanking movement which demoralized the besiegers, while Akati endeavoured in vain to rally the cracked regiment, which led to his demise. His now leaderless army then broke into a retreat.

Late into the night, the king himself started a retreat which was followed by the rest of the army in the period close to dawn as the retreating Dahomeans were closely pursued by the Egbas. At Ishaga, the retreaters made a resolute U-turn to fight but were once again put to flight by the Egba. By this point, the battle had lasted over two days and only about 1,209 Dahomeans were left on the battlefield. More than 3,000 Dahomeans were killed in the course of the battle, many more were wounded and another 1,000 taken prisoners. The prestige of dahomey and their 'aura of martial invincibility' had been delt a severe blow by their catastrophic loss. The vengeful Dahomeans would later embark on a punitive expedition that destroyed Ishaga on March 5, 1862, eleven years after they first marched through the town. 1,000 were killed and between 3,000-4,000 denizens were taken captive and enslaved, three quarters of whom were taken to the slave port at Ouidah. Oba Koko; the king himself was taken to Agbome and killed by decapitation there.

Oba Kosoko of Lagos was not deterred by Ghezo's loss at Abeokuta, Townsend encouraged the Egba to send a force under Bshorun Shomoye to go protect the town of Badagry from the impending attack. A few weeks later, he succeeded in burning down Badagry, but the leader of the pro-slavery faction was killed in the ensuing battle, and the anti-slavery faction within the town ultimately won the civil war for control.

== Dahomey seeks Yoruba assistance ==
On April 7, 1858, the consul Benjamin Campbell reported in a correspondence that the king of Dahomey had sent emissaries to the rulers of various large Yoruba towns to obtain assistance and enablement in his planned attack on Abeokuta the following year. These included various diplomatic missions to the kings of Oyo at Ago Oja, Ijaye, Kosoko of Lagos, Egba, Ilorin, Ijebu and Ibadan.

To the Alaafin, Ghezo offered a renewal of the payment of the customary annual tributes which before Dahomey's independence was usually sent to Oyo. He also offered to assist Atiba the Alaafin in subduing all his former vassals who were by then independent, and to regain his power over all the Yoruba tribes.

== Death of Ghezo ==
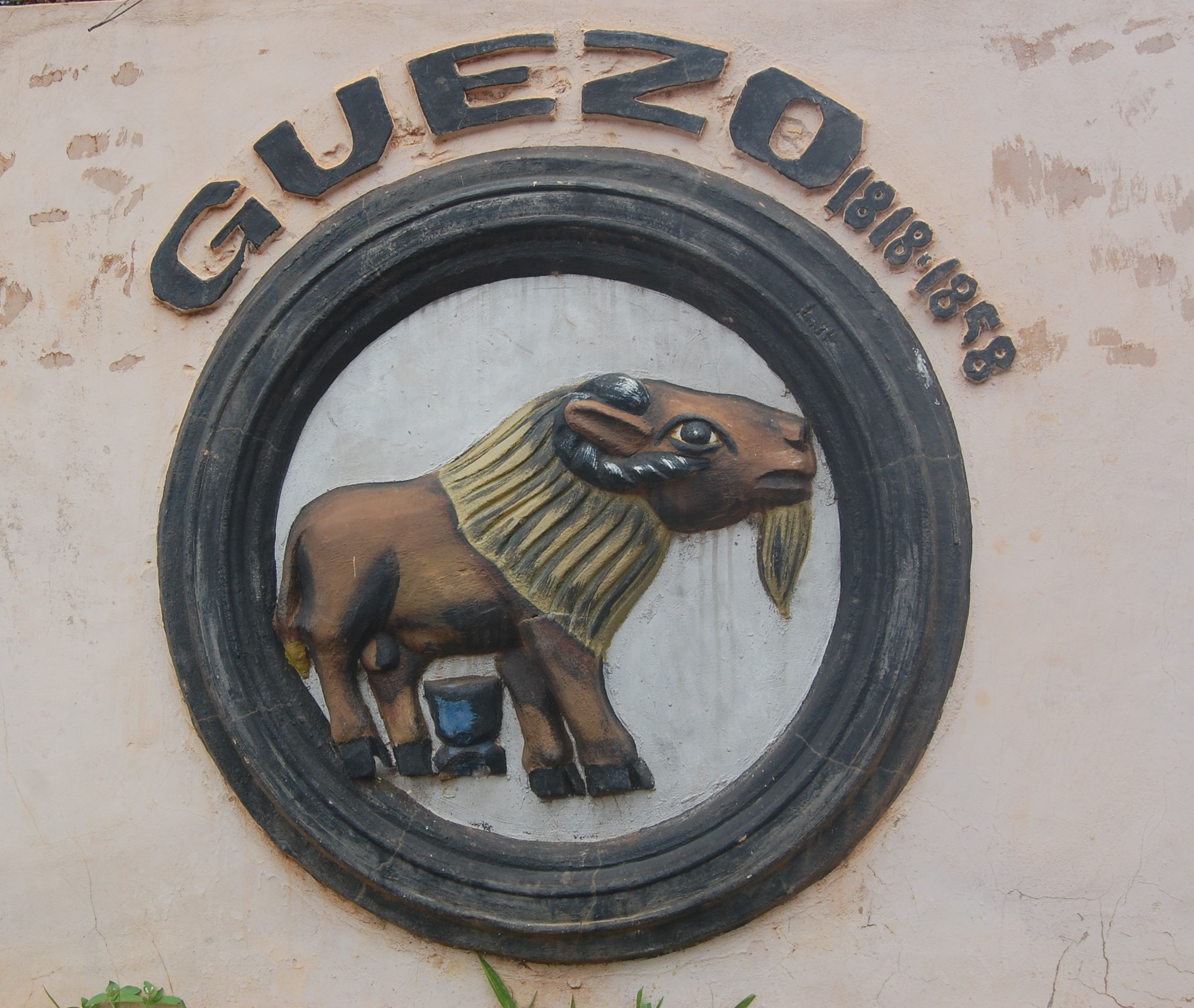
Symbol of Ghezo

Following Dahomey's first failed invasion of Abeokuta, the kingdom continued to relentlessly attack and pillage the surrounding countryside of the western Yoruba kingdoms (including the Egba countryside) and the Mahi people through the 1850s, but never felt strong enough to attack Abeokuta head-on again. King Ghezo was on one of such raiding campaigns in the Egba and Ketu country in 1858 when he is mortally wounded by gunfire from a Ketu sniper in the village of Ekpo about 4 kilometres (2.5 mi) from Ketu town.

According French missionary accounts, the king had been reluctant to embark on the mission against Ekpo because of an earlier prophecy that an attack against the village would lead to his death, but he was pressured into action by his war chiefs. He tried reaching Agbọmẹ (Abomey) to die within the walls of the royal palace, but he would succumb to his injury and die in the village of Zagnanado, which means; lit. 'A bad night has fallen' in Fon (in reference to the King's death there). Zañanado was the camp headquarters of Dahomey's eastern front war campaigns. Other narratives about his death attribute it to an assassination by poisoning, or smallpox, but he was very likely mortally wounded by a local Ketu youth.

== Second battle of Abeokuta (2nd Egba – Dahomey war) ==
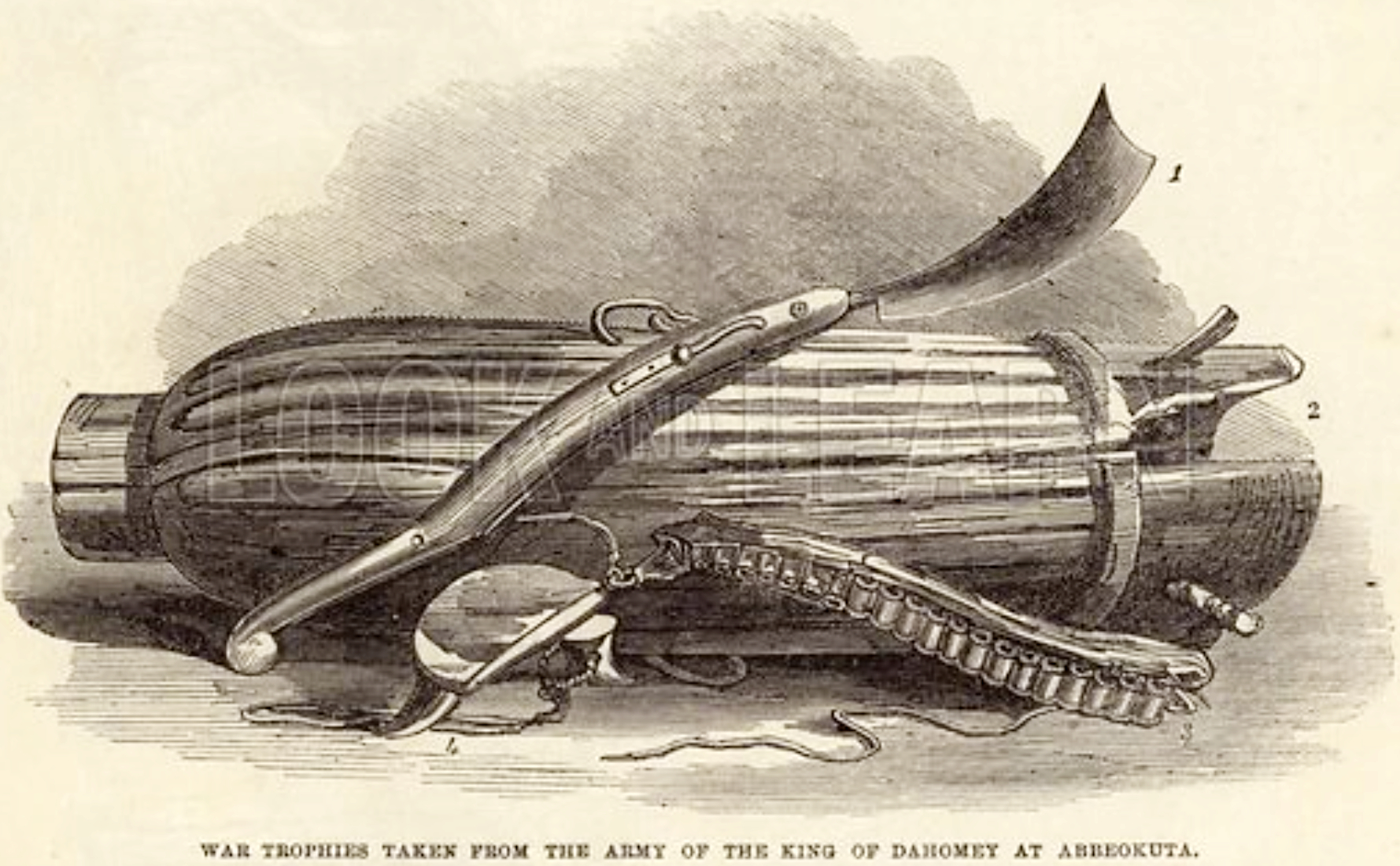
War trophies captured by Abeokuta from the army of the king of Dahomey, 1864

On February 22, 1864, the military of Dahomey set out from Agbome for the second attempted invasion of Abeokuta under king Glele, son of Ghezo with a corp of between 10,000 to 14,000 warriors after a previous aborted attempt in 1863. The motive behind the second Egba-Dahomey war might have been to 'avenge the insult', recover the kingdom's royal throne, recover the 'royal wives' captured and appropriated by the Egba leaders in the first invasion, and to avenge the defeat (and subsequent death) of his father, Ghezo. Glele thus considered the destruction of Abeokuta his life's mission.

Unlike the first invasion, the journey towards Abeokuta was much slower. It took them 22 days to cover 160.93 kilometres (100.00 mi) because they had taken a long detour, hoping to trick the Egbas and catch then unawares, but the defenders had advanced warning and were ready and waiting. They repaired the walls and mounted them with two of three field-guns, they had also deepened the rampart ditch surrounding the city.

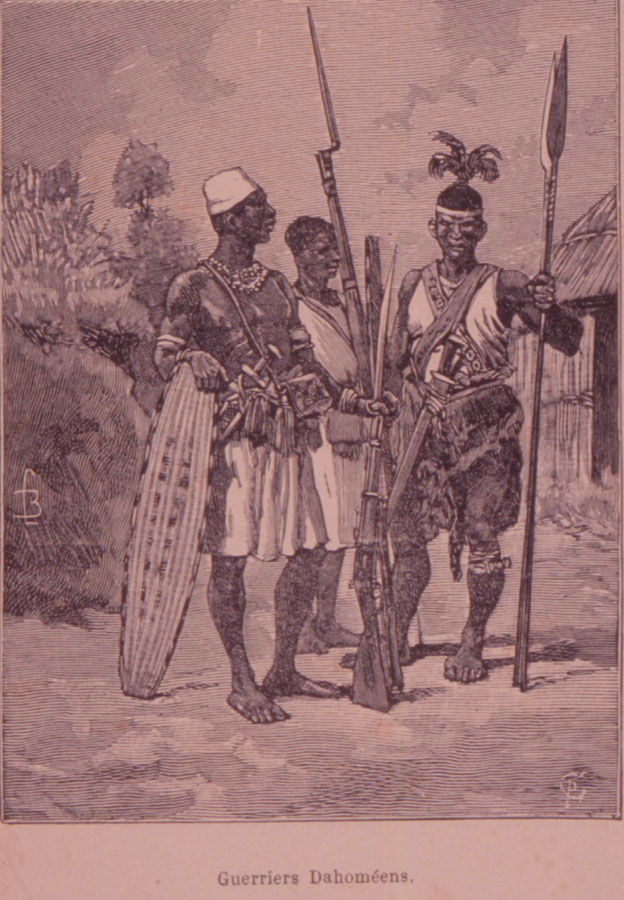
Dahomey soldiers

The Egbas didn't charge out to meet the invading force like they did during the first invasion but stayed behind the rampart. They were also reinforced by contingents from two other Yoruba subgroups this time unlike in 1851. On the night of the 14th into the 15th, the Dahomey marched towards the Ogun River and crossed it in the morning under the cover of fog, forming three columns some 200 metres (660 ft) from the city wall. At around 7:00 AM, they hoisted their flag and charged towards the city along a 700 metres (2,300 ft) front upon the command of the Gau. One of the columns headed for the Aro gate, while the two others headed to the left of it braving enemy fire.

Just like in the previous encounters, the result of the ill-fated campaign was disastrous. Only four Dahomeans got all the way across Abeokuta's defences before being killed, all were women. The invading Fon military gave up after an hour and a half and began an orderly westward retreat which the Egbas pressed in sharp pursuit. Fighting continued, first at Ibara, then to Ishaga after which the retreat turned into a total rout.

Between 4,500 and 6,820 members of the invading force were killed (almost half of the army that had set out) to Abeokuta's 50, while another 1,500 were taken prisoners, however, the Amazons suffered less severe losses both in absolute and proportional terms to their male comrade in arms than in the 1851 war. Glele abandoned some of his wives and daughters, horse, wardrobe, carriages and treasuries, and the army lost numerous 'giant razors', brass guns and new muskets. This left the Dahomey severely weakened and exposed, opening the opportunity for greater French influence and eventual colonization.

The events of the war was recorded with an image caption in the June 1864 issue of the Illustrated London News as thus:

"War trophies taken from the army of the King of Dahomey at Abbeokuta, 1864. Items taken after '...the King of Dahomey's army, reckoned at from ten to fourteen thousand warriors, of whom two thousand were women, suffered a disastrous repulse [by the Egba people] from the walls of Abbeokuta...In the advancing column were Amazons [ie female soldiers], who fought bravely and desperately...[However,] the Dahomians were utterly defeated... The [objects] came out of a box full of trophies of the victory sent by the Rev. H. Townsend, an English missionary at Abbeokuta, to his brother, Mr. George Townsend, who has made a drawing of them for our use. 1. Decapitating-knife, resembling a huge razor, in length about 40 in. It is made to shut like an ordinary razor, and when used, kept tight by a spring. 2. Large wooden drum. This instrument is fluted, and has been split through its entire length in order to discover if it contained charms. Length about 40 in. 3. Cartridge belt, made of skin, and worn by the Amazon round the waist. 4. Dahomian three-legged stool stained with human blood'. From "Illustrated London News", 1864.

== Aftermath ==
According to Ade-Ajayi, the second Abeokuta war and the resultant Egba victory put a final end to any hope of a Dahomean occupation, conquest or destruction of the city. It also effectively put an end to Dahomey's regional ambitions towards the east. Fortunately for Dahomey however, Abeokuta never grew strong enough to take the war to the Dahomean heartland and threaten the kingdom's own political existence.

According to Alpern (2011) however, Dahomey never lost hope of obliterating Abeokuta. It became an obsession throughout Glele's reign, and Townsend reported a rumour that Glele could not "enjoy the full honours of king" until he fulfilled the pledge to his father to bring down the Egba metropolis. A missionary source counted a total of seven different invasions of the Egba country between 1851 and 1876, and various skirmishes and invasions continued till as late as May 1891 under Gbehanzin before Dahomey was eventually conquered by the French.

== Analysis ==
The Fon of Dahomey seem to have underestimated the sheer size of Abeokuta their enemy as well as its natural defenses between the wide Ogun river and the foothills of the rocks at which it lay. Ghezo had considered his capital of Abomey a 'large town', and had no conception of the immensity of what Abeokuta represented. As such, he had expected to overwhelm it as he did Oke Odan years earlier.

They were also totally oblivious or nonchalantly dismissive of the wall which surrounded the city, which has been variously described as being 2 to 5 meters high, 24.14 kilometres (15.00 mi) (in 1851), 32.18 kilometres (20.00 mi) (in 1864) long, and as well as its outer ditch 3 to 5 meters wide and 3 meters deep with an outer slope hedged by thorny acacia.

It has been noted that one of the most important factors that led to the consistent Abeokuta/Egba victories against Dahomey was the fact that on the three occasions between 1844 and 1864 when both sides warred, there were no other major wars ongoing in Yorubaland, and neither were the Egba forces pre-occupied with other martial engagements elsewhere, resulting in an available corp of young and 'able-bodied' men to defend their nascent city-state on the one and only active war front.

Resentment for Abeokuta and the Egba remained strong in Dahomey even after French conquest, and according to a statement attributed to Agbidinoukoun, a court chronicler and brother to Behanzin, 'conquest (by the French) would have been easier to bear had the Fon previously defeated Abeokuta. "Nevertheless, we have one consolation, the inhabitants of Abeokuta too are under the domination of the whites."'

== See also ==
- Egba United Government
- Timeline of Yoruba history (19th century AD)
- Yoruba Wars

== Bibliography ==
- Akintoye, Stephen Adebanji (1 January 2010). A History of the Yoruba People. Amalion Publishing. pp. 1–510. ISBN 978-2-35926-027-4.
- Olorunyomi, Sola (2003). Afrobeat!: Fela and the Imagined Continent. Africa World Press. p. 70. ISBN 978-1-59221-096-1.
- McKenzie, Peter (14 August 2023). Hail Orisha!: A Phenomenology of a West African Religion in the Mid-Nineteenth Century. BRILL. ISBN 978-90-04-66468-5.
- Talbot, P.A (1969). The peoples of Southern Nigeria: a sketch of their history, ethnology and languages with an abstract of the 1921 census. F. Cass.
- Page, Willie F. (2005). Davis, R. Hunt (ed.). Encyclopedia of African History And Culture, Volume 3. p. 38.
- Ade Ajayi, J F. (1965). A Thousand Years of West African History. Ibadan University Press. p. 37.
- Law, Robin (1993). "The 'Amazons' of Dahomey". Paideuma. 39: 245–260. JSTOR 40341664.
- Law, Robin (1986). "Early European Sources Relating to the Kingdom of Ijebu (1500-1700): A Critical Survey". History in Africa. 13: 245–260. doi:10.2307/3171544. ISSN 0361-5413. JSTOR 3171544.
- Smith, Robert Sydney (1976). Kingdoms of the Yoruba. Methuen. ISBN 978-0-416-84710-9.
