= Seh-Dong-Hong-Beh =

Military commander among the Dahomey Amazons

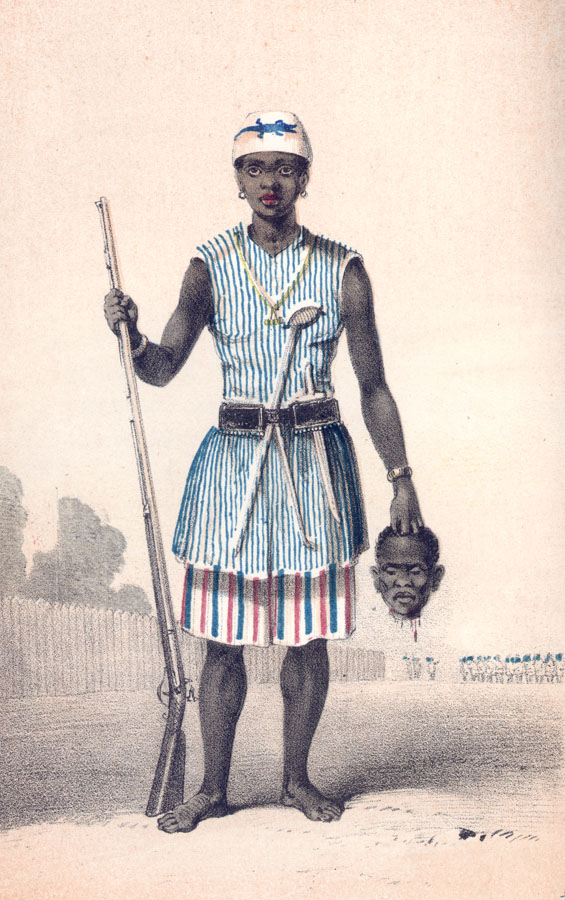
- Seh-Dong-Hong-Beh, drawn by Frederick Forbes, 1851
- Born: 1815/1835
- Died: after 1851

Seh-Dong-Hong-Beh (meaning, "God Speaks true") was a leader of the Dahomey Amazons. In 1851, she led an all-female army consisting of 6,000 warriors against the Egba fortress of Abeokuta, to obtain slaves from the Egba people for the Dahomey slave trade.

She was portrayed in a hand drawn, partially colored portrait in her uniform, armed with a musket and holding a captive's severed head, in the 1851 book "Dahomey and the Dahomans" by Frederick Edwyn Forbes, a British Navy Commander and member of the Royal Geographical Society. As a deeply convinced abolitionist, he traveled to the Dahomey kingdom in 1849–50 with the mission of convincing king Guezo to stop the African slave trade. He described the female Dahomeyan army in detail, commenting on their lifestyle and behaviour as inserts in his negative descriptions and observations of the Dahomey wars that serviced the slave trade.

F. E. Forbes was not the only naval officer trying to end the slave trade in West Africa that mentioned the Dahomey female army.

As quoted from the book about her king, commander and ceremonial husband, the Dahomeyan king Guezo, in the years 1850–1852:

In order to bring an end to slave dealing, the British Navy went in search of the final traders and offered them large sums of money in exchange for firm promises to give up their lucrative business. Guezo, King of Dahomey had an army of 3,000 women, to each of whom he was married, having sold all the menfolk as slaves. For entertainment he indulged in the sacrifice of trespassers from neighbouring West African countries. He welcomed the approach of the naval officers, declaring Victoria and Albert as his closest friends.
