= Dahomey Amazons =

Female regiment in the Kingdom of Dahomey

Dahomey Amazons (Agojie / Mino)
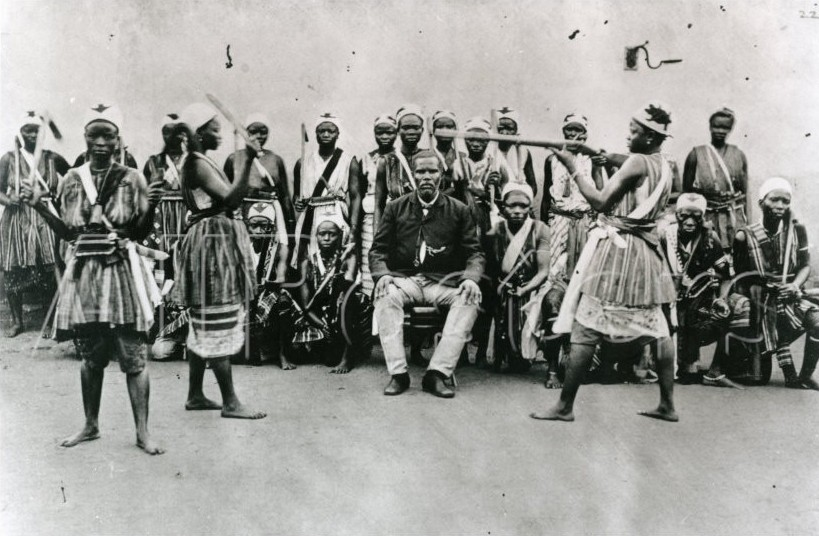
- Dahomey Mino warriors, circa 1890.
- Active: 17th century – 1894 (disbanded); 1904 (final veterans)
- Country: Kingdom of Dahomey (modern-day Benin)
- Type: Elite infantry / Royal bodyguards
- Role: Front-line combat, Palace security, Elephant hunting
- Size: 1,000 – 6,000 at peak
- Nicknames: "Our Mothers" (Mino), "King's Wives" (Ahosi)
- Equipment: Winchester rifles, muskets, reapers (short swords), clubs
- Engagements: First Franco-Dahomean War; Second Franco-Dahomean War; Egba-Dahomey War; Battle of Cotonou

The Dahomey Amazons (Fon: Agojie, Agoji, Mino, or Minon) were a Fon all-female military regiment of the Kingdom of Dahomey (in today's Benin, West Africa) that existed from the 17th century until the late 19th century. They were the only female army in modern history. They were named Amazons by Western Europeans who encountered them, due to the story of the female warriors called Amazons in Greek mythology.

The emergence of an all-female military regiment was the result of Dahomey's male population facing high casualties in the increasingly frequent violence and warfare with neighbouring West African states. This led to Dahomey being one of the leading states in the slave trade with the Oyo Empire, which used slaves for commodity exchange in West Africa until the slave trade in the region was ended through British pressure. The lack of men likely led the kings of Dahomey to recruit women into the army. The formation of a female-only army unit was a retaliation and maneuver around the forced tribute of male slaves to Oyo each year.

== Origin ==
King Houegbadja (who ruled from 1645 to 1685), the third King of Dahomey, is said to have originally started the group which would later become the Mino as a corps of elephant hunters called the gbeto. The gbeto may even predate Houegbadja, as there is a tradition where he merely organized pre-existing groups into a corps, and another where the gbeto themselves offered to serve the king.

Houegbadja's daughter Queen Hangbe (ruling from 1716 to 1718) established a female bodyguard. European merchants recorded their presence. According to tradition, her brother and successor King Agaja successfully used them in Dahomey's defeat of the neighbouring Kingdom of Whydah centered in Savi in 1727. The group of female warriors was referred to as Mino, meaning "Our Mothers" in the Fon language, by the male army of Dahomey. Other sources contest the claim that King Agaja's older sister Queen Hangbe was the ruler to establish the units, some even going so far as to question whether or not Queen Hangbe actually existed.

From the time of King Ghezo (ruling from 1818 to 1858), Dahomey became increasingly militaristic. Ghezo placed great importance on the army, increasing its budget and formalizing its structure from ceremonial to a serious military. While European narratives refer to the women soldiers as "Amazons", they called themselves ahosi (king's wives) or Mino (our mothers). This group aided Ghezo in the Battle of Ketu and Sabe against the Oyo Empire.

== Recruitment ==
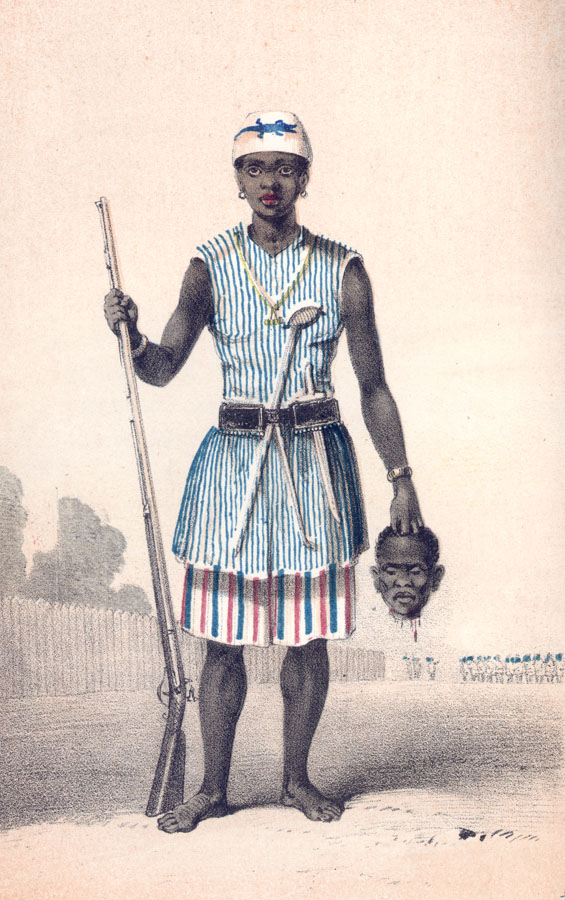
Seh-Dong-Hong-Beh, a leader of the Amazons, drawing by Frederick Edwyn Forbes, 1851

Ghezo recruited both men and women as soldiers from foreign captives. Female soldiers were also recruited from free Dahomean women, with some enrolled from as young as eight years of age. Other accounts indicate that the Mino were recruited from among the ahosi ("king's wives"), of which there were often hundreds. Some women in Fon society became soldiers voluntarily, while others were involuntarily enrolled if their husbands or fathers complained to the king about their behaviour.

Membership among the Mino was supposed to hone any aggressive character traits for the purpose of war. During their membership they were not allowed to have children or be part of married life (though they were legally married to the king). Many of them were virgins. The regiment had a semi-sacred status, which was intertwined with the Fon belief in Vodun. Oral Dahomean tradition holds that, upon recruitment, the Amazons were subjected to female circumcision.

The Mino trained with intense physical exercise. They learned survival skills and indifference to pain and death, storming acacia-thorn defences in military exercises and executing prisoners. Discipline was emphasised.

Serving in the Mino offered women the opportunity to "rise to positions of command and influence" in an environment structured for individual empowerment. The Mino were also wealthy and held high status.

== Political role ==
The Mino took a prominent role in the Grand Council, debating the policy of the kingdom. From the 1840s to 1870s (when the opposing party collapsed), the majority of Mino generally supported peace with the Egba of Abeokuta arguing instead to raid smaller, less defended tribes. This set them at odds with their male military colleagues, who supported a full-on assault of Abeokuta. Civilian council members who allied with the Agojie also advocated for stronger commercial relations with Britain, favouring the trade of palm oil above that of slaves.

Apart from the council, the Annual Customs of Dahomey included a parade and reviewing of the troops, and the troops swearing an oath to the king. The celebrations on the 27th day of the Annual Customs consisted of a mock battle in which the Agojie attacked a "fort" and "captured" the slaves within, a custom recorded by the priest Francesco Borghero in his diaries.

== Combat and structure ==
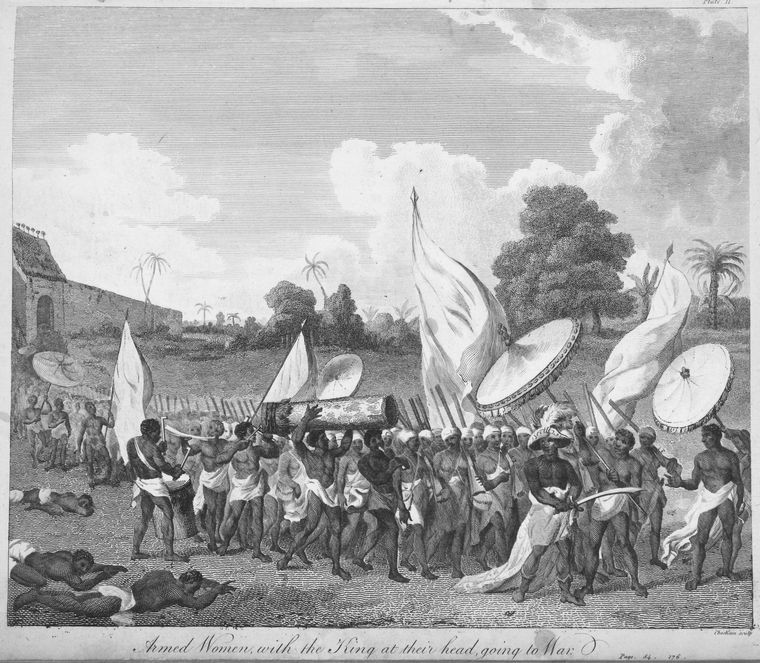
Dahomey Amazons with the king at their head, going to war – 1793

The women soldiers were rigorously trained in pain, endurance and speed. Once training was completed they were given uniforms. By the mid-19th century, they numbered between 1,000 and 6,000 women, about a third of the entire Dahomey army, according to reports written by visitors. The reports also noted that the women soldiers were consistently judged to be superior to the male soldiers in effectiveness and bravery in battle.

The women soldiers were said to be structured in parallel with the army as a whole, with a centre wing (the king's bodyguards) flanked on both sides, each under separate commanders. Some accounts note that each male soldier had a mino counterpart. In one mid-19th-century account by an English observer, it was documented that the women who had three stripes of whitewash around each leg were honoured with marks of distinction.

The women's army consisted of a number of regiments: huntresses, riflewomen, reapers, archers and gunners. Each regiment had different uniforms, weapons and commanders.

In the latter period, the Dahomean female warriors were armed with Winchester rifles, clubs and knives. Units were under female command. An 1851 published translation of a war chant of the women claims the warriors would chant: "[a]s the blacksmith takes an iron bar and by fire changes its fashion so have we changed our nature. We are no longer women, we are men."

=== Conflict with neighbouring kingdoms ===
The Agojie battles consisted mainly within Africa against various kingdoms and tribes. During that time period it was customary that once an enemy was defeated they would be killed or enslaved. Victims transported on the last ship known to have taken enslaved people to the United States, the Clotilda, reported that the Dahomey Amazons participated in their enslavement. Many African tribes participated in the slave trade and Dahomey was no exception. They would often enslave their enemies and sell them to European slave traders in exchange for weaponry for battle. As early as 1728, under the direction of King Agaja, the Dahomean army conquered the kingdoms of Whydah, and Popos. In 1840, they helped to capture the fortress of the Mahee at Attahapahms. However, it was at the hands of their long-standing enemy Abeokuta that they suffered crushing defeat, resulting in many casualties.

== Conflict with France ==
=== First Franco-Dahomean War ===
The European encroachment into West Africa gained pace during the latter half of the 19th century, and in 1890 King Béhanzin started fighting French forces in the course of the First Franco-Dahomean War. European observers noted that the women "handled admirably" in hand-to-hand combat, but fired their flintlocks from the hip rather than firing from the shoulder.

The Mino participated in one major battle: Cotonou, where thousands of Dahomeans (including many Mino) charged the French lines and engaged the defenders in hand-to-hand combat. The Mino were decisively crushed, with several hundred Dahomey troops being gunned down. Reportedly, 129 Dahomey fighters were killed in melee combat within the French lines.

=== Second Franco-Dahomean War ===
By the end of the Second Franco-Dahomean War, special units of the Mino were being assigned specifically to target French officers. After several battles, the French prevailed in the Second Franco-Dahomean War and put an end to the independent Dahomean kingdom. French soldiers, particularly of the French Foreign Legion, were impressed by the boldness of the Amazons and later wrote about their "incredible courage and audacity" in combat.

Against a military unit with decidedly superior weaponry and a longer bayonet, however, the Dahomey Mino could not prevail. During a battle with French soldiers at Adegon on October 6, 1892, during the second war, the bulk of the Mino corps were wiped out in a matter of hours in hand-to-hand combat after the French engaged them with a bayonet charge. The Dahomey lost 86 regulars and 417 Dahomey Mino, with nearly all of those deaths being inflicted by bayonets; the French lost six soldiers.

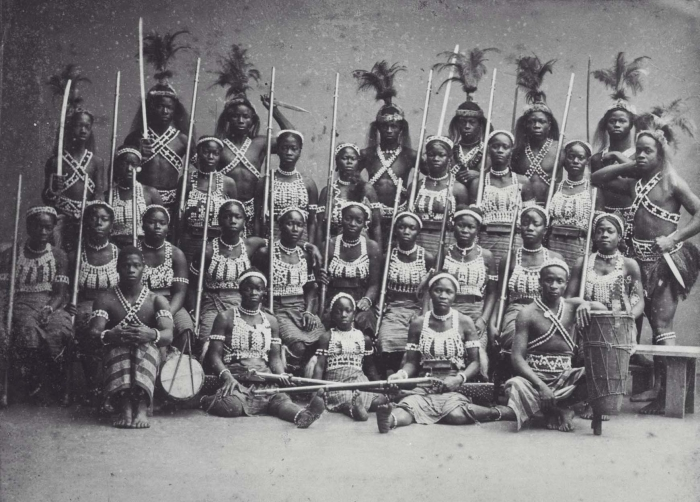
A group portrait of the "Amazons from Dahomey" during their stay in Paris, 1891

== Disbandment and legacy ==
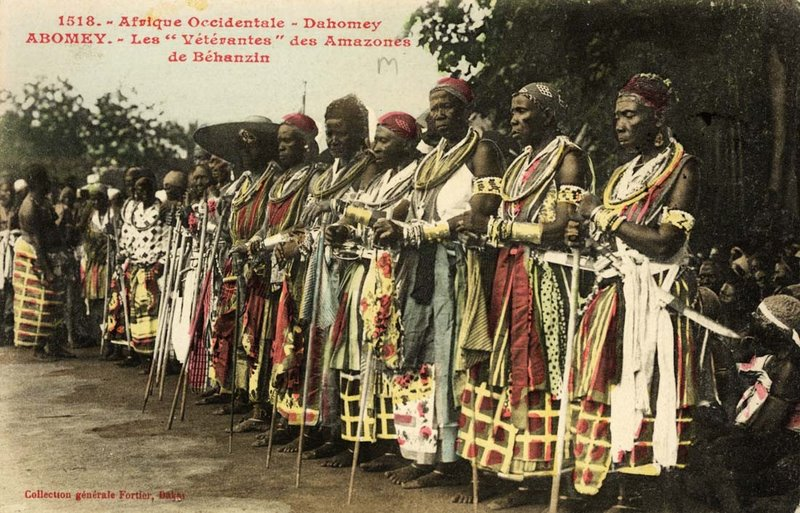
Veterans at the annual meeting in Abomey in 1908

The troops were disbanded when the kingdom became a French protectorate in 1894. Oral tradition states that some surviving Mino secretly remained in Abomey afterwards, where they quietly assassinated a number of French officers. Other stories say the women pledged their services in protection of Agoli-Agbo, the brother of Béhanzin, disguising themselves as his wives in order to guard him.

Some of the women married and had children, while others remained single. According to a historian who traced the lives of almost two dozen former Mino, all the women displayed difficulties adjusting to life as retired warriors, often struggling to find new roles in their communities that gave them a sense of pride comparable to their former lives. Many displayed a tendency to start fights or arguments that frightened their neighbours and relatives.

Between 1934 and 1942, several British travellers in Abomey recorded encounters with former Mino, then old women who spun cotton or idled around courtyards. An unknown number of women are said to have trained with the members of the Dahomey Mino after they were disbanded, in effect continuing the tradition. They never saw combat. Around 2019, Lupita Nyong'o interviewed one of these who was still alive, for the TV documentary Warrior Women with Lupita Nyong'o.

=== Nawi, the last Dahomey Mino ===
The last survivor of the Dahomey Mino is thought to have been a woman named Nawi. In a 1978 interview in the village of Kinta, a Beninese historian met Nawi, who claimed to have fought the French in 1892. Nawi died in November 1979, aged well over 100.

== In popular culture ==
A statue unveiled in 2022 in Cotonou, Benin, the second tallest in Africa, honors the Dahomey Amazons.

Dahomey Mino are mentioned in the sci-fi novel Robur the Conqueror (1886) by Jules Verne (Chapter XV: A skirmish in Dahomey).

Dahomey Mino were represented in the 1987 film Cobra Verde by German director Werner Herzog.

Ghezo's Mino play a significant role in the 1971 novel Flash for Freedom! by George MacDonald Fraser.

The warriors are also the main focus and written about in Layon Gray's stage play The Dahomey Warriors.

The Dora Milaje, warriors and bodyguards of the Marvel Comics character Black Panther, are partially based on the Dahomey Mino.

In Age of Empires II: The African Kingdoms and Age of Empires III: The African Royals there is a female unit named Gbeto that is influenced by and named after Dahomey Mino.

In the video game Empire: Total War you can recruit Dahomey Mino units if you have conquered certain regions in North Africa.

In the Lovecraft Country episode "I Am", Hippolyta is transported to a world where she becomes a Dahomey Mino.

In 2015, UNESCO published the graphic novel The Women Soldiers of Dahomey as part of their UNESCO Series on Women in African History. As an artistic and visual interpretation intended for private or public use in classrooms, it tells the story of the Mino in connection with European colonial rule in Africa and ends with their legacy for the present-day Republic of Benin: "In addition to the imprint that they have left on the collective memory, the women soldiers bequeathed to the Republic of Benin dances that are performed to this day in Abomey, songs and legends. There are many women soldiers in the Benin Armed Forces today. They keep the memory of the women soldiers of the Kingdom of Dahomey alive."

"The Last Amazon of Dahomey" is a play in the Booker Prize-winning novel of 2019 called Girl, Woman, Other, by Bernardine Evaristo.

The Ahosi are featured in the 2021 graphic novel Wake: The Hidden History of Women-Led Slave Revolts by Rebecca Hall and Hugo Martinez.

The Dahomey Mino are the subject of the 2022 American film The Woman King, directed by Gina Prince-Bythewood.

Dahomey Amazons are represented as Minos in the novel Sister Mother Warrior by Vanessa Riley (William Morrow, July 12, 2022).

Mortal Kombat 1 has the Umgadi, which are references to the Dahomey Minos.

== See also ==
- Nzinga of Ndongo and Matamba
- Gudit
- Kahina
- Amina of Zazzau

== Sources ==
- This article incorporates text from a free content work. Licensed under C-BY-SA 3.0 IGO. Text taken from The women soldiers of Dahomey, UNESCO.

== Bibliography ==
- Alpern, Stanley B. (1998b). Amazons of Black Sparta: The Women Warriors of Dahomey (1st ed.). New York, U.S.: New York University Press. ISBN 978-0-8147-0678-7.
- Araujo, Ana Lucia, & Suzanne Blier (September 20, 2022). "What 'The Woman King' gets wrong — and right — about Dahomey's warriors". Washington Post.
- Bernard, A. S. 1998. Amazons of Black Sparta. London, C Hurst & Co. Bourgeon, F. 1979 – 1984.
- Clodfelter, Tim (August 5, 2017). "Play tells story of West African warrior women". Winston-Salem Journal.
- Dash, Mike (September 23, 2011). "Dahomey's Women Warriors". Smithsonian.com.
- Historical Museum of Abomey. "The Amazons". Historical Museum of Abomey. Archived from the original on October 17, 2013.
- Johnson, Jazzi (February 23, 2018). "If You Loved Black Panther's Dora Milaje, Meet the Dahomey Amazons". Teen Vogue Magazine.
- Law, Robin (1993). "The 'Amazons' of Dahomey". Paideuma: Mitteilungen zur Kulturkunde. 39. Frobenius Institute: 245–260. JSTOR 40341664.
- Yoder, John C. (1974). "Fly and Elephant parties: Political polarization in Dahomey, 1840–1870". The Journal of African History. 15 (3). Cambridge University Press: 417–432. doi:10.1017/S0021853700013566. S2CID 162286376.
