= Kingdom of Save =

- 1750–1855
- Status: Monarchy
- Capital: Abomey
- Official languages: Yoruba, Fon
- Religion: Yoruba religion
- Demonym: Kingdom of Savé
- History
  - Established: 1750
  - Disestablished: 1855

The Kingdom of Savè , also known as Sabé (Yoruba: Ṣábẹ̀ẹ́), was a former Yoruba kingdom located on the eastern border of present-day Benin with Nigeria. Born from a mosaic of city-states and cultural groups, it developed in the 18th century around the town of Ile-Savè (present-day Savè). The kingdom experienced periods of centralization and instability until its final collapse in 1885 following the destruction of its capital by the Kingdom of Dahomey.

== Geography ==
The kingdom extended from the Oyan River in the west to the Ouémé River in the east. The terrain is characterized by large hills and rocky outcrops, approximately 200 km north of the Beninese coast. The environment, rich in alluvial soils, allows for stable agriculture. Production includes vegetables, yams, tobacco, and palm oil, intended for local consumption and trade. Cattle breeding and cotton cultivation are also part of these activities .

== History ==
=== Context and training ===
The region has experienced multiple waves of settlement. The first inhabitants came from the Popo region, followed by Yoruba migrants in the ^{15th} and 16th centuries ^{.} These established a series of city-states in the Savè hills . In the 16th ^{century} , the Yoruba Amusu group, originally from Borgou, settled in the region after the collapse of the Songhai Empire . Claiming descent from Ile-Ife, they sought to impose their authority but encountered strong resistance from the local population. One of their leaders, Ola Musu, managed for a time to establish a fragile peace through ritual sacrifices, but conflicts quickly resumed under his successors.

Official tradition states that the last migration from Borgou was led by a chief, Baba Gidai, who gave his name to the migratory group . The Savè kingdom took shape around 1750, when Yai, leader of the Babagidai group, managed to centralize power over several city-states and was recognized as oba . Although the Babagidai were not of Yoruba origin, their linguistic and cultural assimilation facilitated this rise to power. Yai attempted to integrate the Amusu, but their rebellions provoked three battles, the last of which ended with their submission. His authority relied on alliances with lineage chiefs. However, stability remained fragile, and the succession upon the deaths of Yai and his brother Sabi was complicated .

=== Crises and downfall ===
Under the fifth king, Akinkanju, the kingdom experienced a period of peace. This ruler established a permanent council of lineage chiefs and extended his influence through the slave trade with Porto Novo . However, Savè's open position continued to expose it to external pressures .

In 1828, King Ghézo of Dahomey had about thirty Savé prisoners beheaded after a raid, drastically damaging relations between the two kingdoms From the mid- 19th ^{century} onward, raids by Fulani jihadists weakened the kingdom. In 1835, the accession to the throne of Ina Mego, a woman, sparked a resurgence in the kingdom. She had defensive walls built around the capital, but her rule was contested in a patriarchal society. She was overthrown in 1845, leaving the kingdom divided among several claimants .

The second half of the 19th ^{century} saw an intensification of external attacks. Groups from the Kingdom of Dahomey increased their incursions. The capital of Ile-Savè was destroyed in 1848, and again in 1855. Despite reconstruction efforts, the raids continued. In 1885, a final Dahomean attack led to the definitive destruction of the capital and marked the end of the Kingdom of Savè's independence . A king favorable to Dahomey was installed by Glélé ; however, in 1894, the Kingdom of Savè accepted the protectorate of the colony of Dahomey, without being able to regain any form of autonomy .

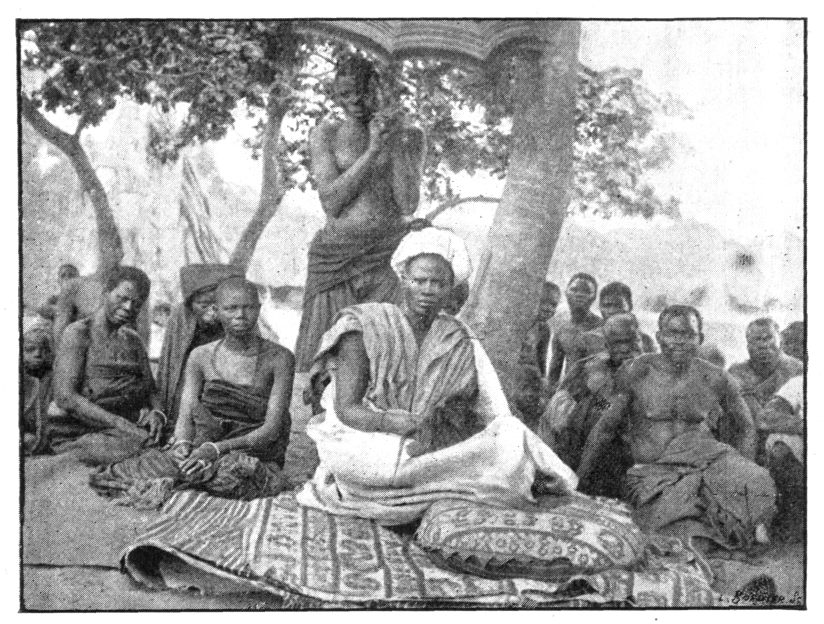
The Kingdom of Save in Benin around 1890, surrounded by Marabouts

During the colonial period, successions to the throne continued without the oba holding any real power. The last oba, Adégbamife, died in 1973. With Benin's independence in 1974, the traditional monarchy was definitively abolished . Today, a symbolic traditional chief is still enthroned as king to preserve the kingdom's traditions. The most recent king enthroned in July 2005 was Adetutu Akikenju .

== Organisation ==
The oba exercises his authority in Savè, but he is consecrated in Djabata, on one of the hills. He is wearing the adé , royal symbol of Oduduwa .

Official tradition establishes a genealogy that traces back to Baba Gidai, the founding ancestor of the kingdom, whose son Ola Obe became the first Oba to be enthroned. From his two sons who succeeded him, Ola Mone and Ola Akikenju, descend the two dynastic houses that alternate in succession. This system was put in place to exclude claimants from the Yoruba Amusu group, which had settled locally before the Babagidai.
